= Iain Borb MacLeod =

Scottish clan chief

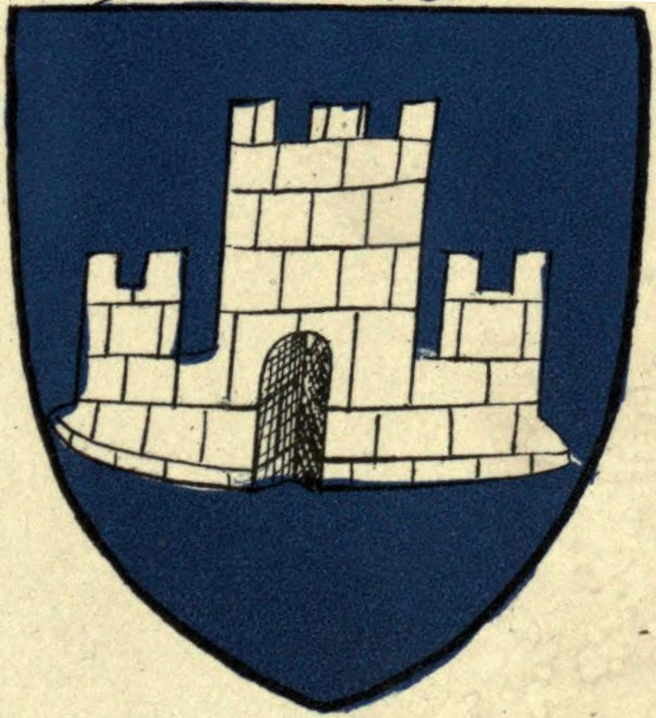
- Arms of MacLeod of Harris and Dunvegan, dating to the tenure of Iain Borb's chiefship.
- Born: 1392
- Died: 1442 (aged 49–50); Pabbay, Harris
- Resting place: Iona, Scotland
- Known for: The 6th Chief of Clan MacLeod
- Predecessor: William Cleireach (father)
- Successor: William Dubh (second son)
- Spouse(s): Margaret, grddau. of the Earl of Douglas
- Children: 2 sons, 2 daughters.

Iain Borb MacLeod (Scottish Gaelic: Iain Borb MacLeòid; Anglicised as: John "the Turbulent" MacLeod; 1392–1442) is considered to be the sixth chief of Clan MacLeod. He is the first MacLeod chief to which heraldry can be assigned. Clan tradition states that he was a minor at the time of his father's death and for six years an incompetent guardian led the clan to its lowest point in clan history. After reaching the age of maturity, Iain Borb managed to acquire some of the clan's lost lands and led his clan and his kinsmen (the MacLeods of Lewis) in the Battle of Harlaw, in 1411. Iain Borb was wounded in the head during the conflict; the wound never completely healed and confined him to his home on Pabbay for much of his life. Tradition states that he died when this wound re-opened during a fencing/wrestling match. There is some disagreement as to which of his sons was the eldest; however, his son William Dubh was the one who finally succeeded to the chiefship, following his death in 1442.

== Life ==
Iain Borb was the son, and successor of William Cleireach, fifth chief of Clan MacLeod. According to the Bannatyne manuscript, he was only ten years old at the time of his father's death. The manuscript relates how during his minority a guardian was chosen to lead the clan. This man's name was Iain Mishealbhach ('John the Unlucky') who was a cousin of the young Iain Borb. During Iain Mishealbhach's tenure as guardian, the MacLeods of Harris and Dunvegan were at their lowest point in their history. Many of the clan opposed the selection of Iain Mishealbhach, favouring instead Tormod Coil who slew Alastair Cannoch at the Battle of Sligachan. Tormod Coil defied the guardian and seized part of the lands of Glenelg.

The manuscript continues that the during this era, the MacDonalds took full advantage of the disorderedness of the MacLeods. A force of MacDonalds landed at Sleat and took possession of the castles of Dunscaith and Camus and in the process drove the MacLeods out of Sleat. They also invaded North Uist and fought the MacLeods at Cailus, where the MacLeods were completely defeated and further lands were gained by the invaders. Following these victories, the MacDonalds besieged Dunvegan Castle, where the widow of William Cleireach was living at the time. The chief of the MacLeods of Lewis, however, came in force and relieved the castle, defeating the MacDonalds at Fiorlig. Torquil then took the family to Lewis where they remained until Iain Borb reached the age of maturity.

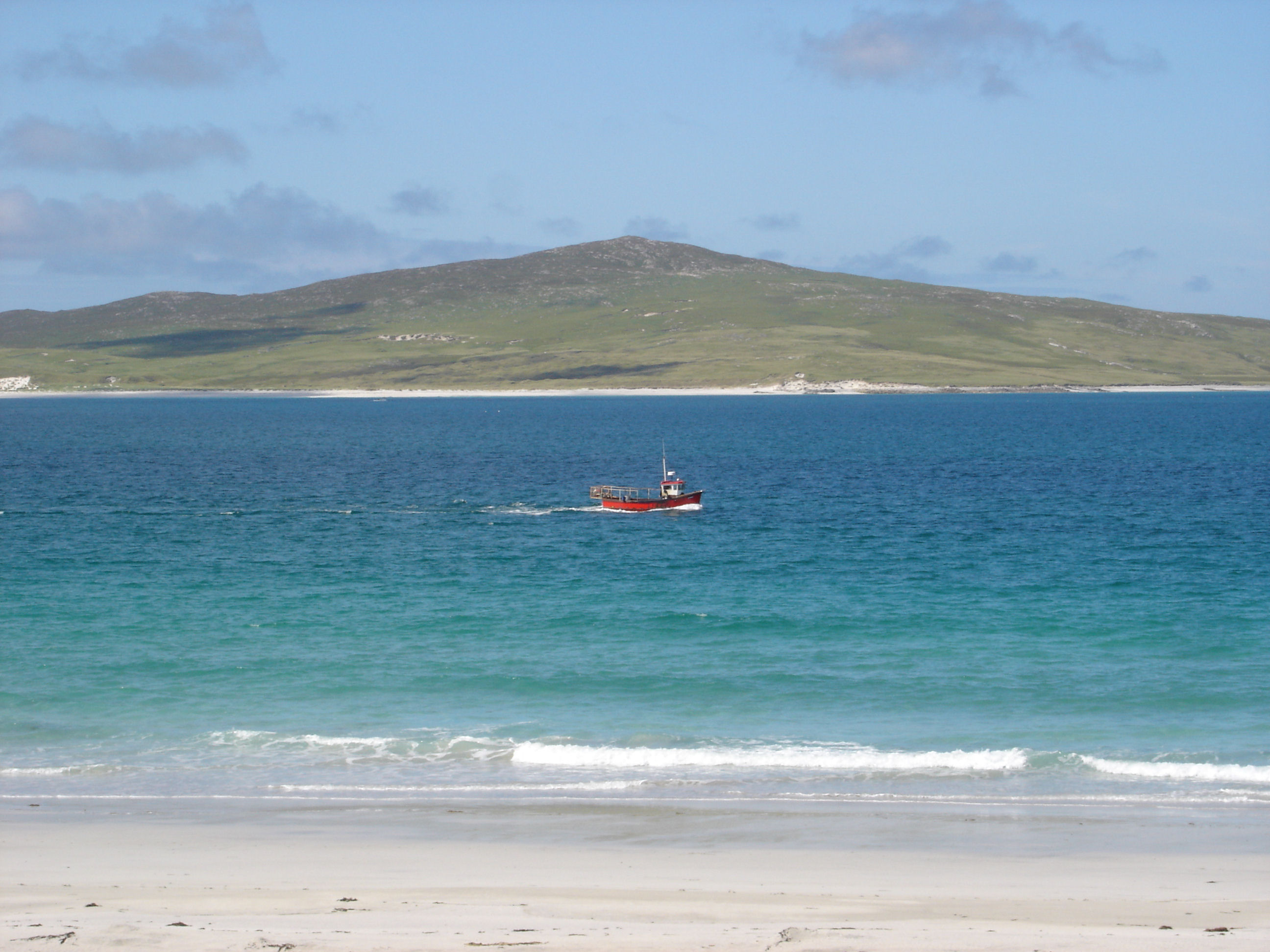
Pabbay, Harris, where Iain Borb spent much of his life and where he died in 1442.

Iain Borb's first act as chief, according to the manuscript, was to hang Iain Mishealbhach, confiscate the dead man's lands, and banish his family. Later, Iain Borb made an agreement with Domhnall, Lord of the Isles, in which the MacDonalds gave back the lands they won from the MacLeods—except the lands on North Uist. Iain Borb swore his vassalage to the Lord of the Isles and in accordance to this agreement fought under the MacDonalds at the Battle of Harlaw in 1411. During the battle, Iain Borb commanded all the MacLeods (including the MacLeods of Lewis) and the manuscript states that the MacLeods had the honour of fighting on the right of Domhnall's forces. Early 20th century Clan Donald historians A. and A. Macdonald, however, stated that both clans of MacLeods were in the main body of men commanded by Domhnall and that the right wing was made up of MacLeans, commanded by Hector MacLean of Duart (Red Hector of the Battles). The manuscript states how Iain Borb was wounded in the head during the conflict. The wound never entirely healed and for the rest of his life it would bleed whenever he became agitated. For the most part, Iain Borb lived at his castle on Pabbay, where he renovated and enlarged the fortress there. The manuscript tells how during a fencing match with his foster-brother, Somerled MacConn, Iain Borb's wound began to bleed so profusely that he bled to death.

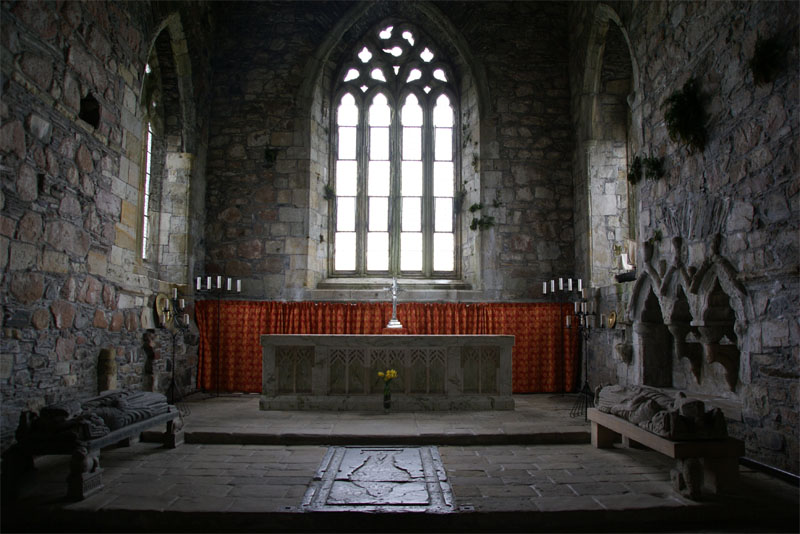
The choir of Iona Abbey. The stone said to represent a MacLeod is visible on the floor in the middle. The effigy on the left (north) is of a Mackinnon, the one on the right is a Mackenzie.

The Bannatyne manuscript states that the first seven chiefs of Clan MacLeod were buried at Iona. Iona Abbey and church date from the 12th century when it was built by Somerled's son Ranald. The choir of Iona Abbey, may date from a later period. Within the centre of the choir there is a large stone which once contained a monumental brass, traditionally said to have been a MacLeod. The stone formed a matrix which at one time contained the brass inlay (tradition states it was a silver inlay). It is the largest carved stone on the island, measuring 7 feet 9.25 inches (2.37 m) by 3 feet 10 inches (1.17 m). R.C. MacLeod speculated that perhaps the clan's founder, Leod, and five of his successors were buried beneath—however, in his opinion the fourth chief, Iain Ciar, was buried elsewhere.

== Issue ==
The Bannatyne manuscript records that Iain Borb married a granddaughter of the Earl of Douglas. Several 20th-century clan historians named her Margaret. The couple had two sons, named William and Norman (Tormod), as well as two daughters. The manuscript maintains that Norman was the elder of the brothers, but that he died young and left a young son who was too young to succeed to the chiefship. In fact, William Dubh succeeded Iain Borb as chief of the clan. R.C. MacLeod considered the fact that the clan considered William chief and not guardian was evidence that William was in fact the elder brother. A. Morrison stated that Norman was probably an illegitimate son of Iain Borb and that he was considerably older than William, since Norman led the clan in battle in 1428. According to Morrison, Norman was killed in 1429 and that his posthumous son was the progenitor of the MacLeods of Waternish. D. MacKinnon stated that he led the MacLeods and was slain at the battle in Lochaber in 1429, supporting Alexander, Lord of the Isles against James I. MacKinnon stated that he married a daughter of Chisholm of Strathglass, and by her had his son, John.

Morrison stated that Iain Borb's daughters were both born in wedlock. According to MacKinnon, one of the daughters, Margaret, married Roderick MacLeod of Lewis (6th clan chief). MacLeod stated that the other daughter married Lachlan MacLean, of Duart (7th chief of Clan MacLean). The late 19th-century clan historian A.M. Sinclair stated that her name was Finvola and noted that the couple had two sons, Neil and John Garbh. However, several years earlier another late 19th century Clan MacLean historian, J.P. MacLean named Lachlan's wife as "Fionnaghal, daughter of William MacLeod of Harris".

== Heraldry ==
Iain Borb is the earliest MacLeod chief to which heraldry can be assigned. The coat of arms of the MacLeods of Harris and Dunvegan appear in the mid 15th century roll of arms Armorial de Berry (although the armorial actually lists the arms as those of "Le sire de bes"). The blazon is: azure, a castle triple-towered argent. The castle may represent the seat of the chiefs—Dunvegan Castle, located on Skye.
