= William Cleireach MacLeod =

Scottish clan chief

- Born: 1365
- Died: c. 1402 (aged 36–37); Castle Camus, Skye
- Resting place: Iona
- Known for: The 5th Chief of Clan MacLeod
- Predecessor: Iain Ciar (father)
- Successor: Iain Borb (son)
- Children: 3 sons & many illegitimate children

William Cleireach MacLeod (Scottish Gaelic: Uilleam Cléireach MacLeòid; 1365 – c. 1402) is considered to be 5th Chief of Clan MacLeod. He was a younger son of chief Iain Ciar and was originally intended to enter the church, as his nickname shows; however, on the death of his elder brother, William Cleireach became the heir to the chiefship. As chief of the clan, he led his followers in attacks against the Frasers and defended his lands against the MacDonalds. He did not live a long life and was said to have been buried on the isle of Iona with his predecessors.

== Life ==
The Bannatyne manuscript states that William Cleireach was the second son of Iain Ciar, fourth chief of Clan MacLeod. William Cleireach was originally bred for the church, having been educated in a monastery abroad. For this reason, he was known as "the clerk". His elder brother was killed at a feast and upon his death, William Cleireach returned home. As Iain Ciar's only surviving son and that William Cleireach succeeded his father upon his death, in 1392. The Bannatyne manuscript records that at the time of William Cleireach's succession, the MacLeods and Frasers were quarrelling as they had been for years previous; in consequence, William invaded the Fraser controlled lands of Aird. The MacLeods were successful in this particular venture and carried off much loot from their invasion.

According to the early 20th-century clan historian R.C. MacLeod, the first record of conflict between the MacLeods and MacDonalds took place during the tenure of William Cleireach. MacLeod stated that Alexander III had originally placed the isles of Skye and Lewis into the earldom of Ross; making the Earl of Ross superiors to the MacLeods. However, in 1335, these lands had been granted by charter to John MacDonald, who would later become the Lord of the Isles. Later, in 1344, the grant of Lewis was confirmed, but Skye reverted to the Earl of Ross. When William Cleireach succeeded to the chiefship in 1392, he then held his lands under three feudal superiors—in Glenelg, as a vassal of the king of Scots; in Skye, as a vassal of the Lord of the Isles; in Skye as a vassal to the Earl of Ross. MacLeod also stated that matters were further complicated by the fact that Donald, who succeeded to the Lordshop of the Isles in 1380, claimed that Skye had been given to him in terms of his marriage to a daughter of the Earl of Ross; and in consequence he claimed that William Cleireach was his own vassal on both Harris and Skye.

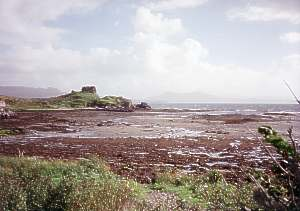
Ruinous Castle Camus.

The MacDonalds, under Alasdair, brother of the Lord of the Isles (and ancestor of the MacDonalds of Keppoch), landed at Eynort. The MacLeods, under William Cleireach, met the invading MacDonald force at the head of Loch Sligachan. The manuscript states that during the bloody encounter, the MacDonalds were defeated and their leader was slain by Tormod Coil, cousin of William Cleireach (and the son of Murdo, William Cleireach's uncle). Following the battle, William Cleireach divided the loot amongst his followers.

The Bannatyne manuscript relates how William Cleireach did not live very long and died relatively young at Castle Camus, in Sleat. It states that he was buried on the sacred island of Iona, probably in about the year 1402.

== Issue ==
The Bannatyne manuscript describes William Cleireach as being much beloved by his followers. He was said to have had many illegitimate children whose descendants were still alive when the manuscript was written (c. 1830s). The manuscript described two of his twin sons as the "Castor and Pollux of the islanders". According to the manuscript, William Cleireach married a daughter of MacLean of Duart (chief of Clan MacLean). The late 19th-century historian A. Mackenzie stated that William's wife was a daughter of John Maclean of Lochbuie (of Clan MacLaine of Lochbuie). However, A.M. Sinclair, another late 19th-century historian, stated that William Cleireach married a daughter of Murdoch MacLaine of Lochbuie (second chief of his clan). The manuscript relates how William and his wife had three sons—John, his heir; Tormod; and George. The manuscript states that from Tormod descended the "Mac Vic Williams"; it notes that the only living descendants were the sons of Capt. William MacLeod of Borline then existed (in about the 1830s), though it also noted that some of the family lived in North Carolina. The manuscript mentions another family, called "Mac Vic Alastair Ruaidh", which was descended from Tormod's second son. The head of this family lived on St Kilda and a notable member of this family was the poet Mairi nighean Alasdair Ruaidh. The manuscript states that William's third son, George, went abroad and settled in Lorraine. An account of the George's descendants was sent to a MacLeod in Britain in the year 1758. The manuscript states that this account professed that descendants of George were known on the continent as "de Leod" and "Von Leod"; that some of them were landowners before the French Revolution.
