= MacLeod of Raasay =

Scottish noble family

The MacLeods of Raasay are a minor Scottish noble family and branch of Clan MacLeod of Lewis. At their height they held extensive lands on the Isle of Raasay. In Gaelic the MacLeods of Lewis were known as Sìol Thorcaill ("Seed of Torquil"). The Chiefship of Clan MacLeod of Lewis (also known as Clan MacLeod of the Lewes) passed to the Raasay branch in the 20th century.

Today, Clan MacLeod, Clan MacLeod of the Lewes, and the MacLeods of Raasay, are all represented by "Associated Clan MacLeod Societies", and the chiefs of the three clans. The association is made up of ten national societies across the world including: Australia, Canada, England, France, Germany, New Zealand, Scotland, South Africa, United States of America, and Switzerland.

== Origins ==
Flag of the Isle of Man. The modern coat of arms of the chiefs of Clan MacLeod (MacLeod of MacLeod) use the three legs of Mann. "The MacLeods believed themselves descended from King Olaf of Man".

=== Olaf the Black ===
Today the official clan tradition is that the MacLeods descend from Leod, born around 1200. Traditionally, from Leod's son Tormod the MacLeods of Harris and Dunvegan claim descent, and through Leod's other son Torquil MacLeods of Lewis claim descent. The earliest evidence of this traditional descent from Olaf the Black may only date as far back as the 17th century, from the era of Iain Mor MacLeod (chief of Clan MacLeod 1626–1649) who was styled "John McOlaus of Dunvegane" in a document dated 1630. Also, his son Iain Breac (chief of Clan MacLeod 1664–1693) is thought to have been the first MacLeod to incorporate the coat of arms of the Kings of Mann into his own coat of arms, because the "MacLeods imagined themselves descended from King Olaf of Man".

=== MacLeods of Lewis ===
The earliest reference to the MacLeods of Lewis is found in a royal charter granted in the reign of David II King of Scots (reigned 1329–1371), when Torcall MacLeod was granted the four penny land of Assynt, possibly in c.1343. In this charter Torcall had no designation, showing that he held no property until then. By 1344 the MacLeods of Lewis held the Isle of Lewis as vassals of the Macdonalds of Islay. In time the MacLeods of Lewis grew in power, with lands stretching from the islands of Lewis, Raasay, the district of Waternish on Skye, and on the mainland Assynt, Coigach and Gairloch.

Fall of the clan and loss of Lewis

The fall of the clan and loss of the Isle of Lewis, began with Ruairi and his marriage to a daughter of John Mackenzie of Kintail. This marriage had produced a son named Torquil Connanach. Ruairi later disowned Torquil Connanach on account of the alleged adultery between his wife and the Morrison brieve of Lewis. In about 1566 Torquil Connanach took up arms, supported by the Mackenzies and kept his supposed father Ruairi as prisoner within the castle of Stornoway. Ruairi took for his third wife a daughter of Hector Og Maclean of Duart, and had by her two sons, Torquil Dubh and Tormod. Ruairi then made Torquil Dubh his heir, and again Torquil Connanach took up arms supported by the Mackenzies. Ruairi was again captured, and many of his men were killed. Upon Torquil Connanach's victory all charters and title deeds of Lewis were handed over to the Mackenzies. Ruairi was held captive in the castle of Stornoway, commanded by Torquil Connanach's son John, though was freed when Ruairi Og attacked the castle and killed John. Upon his release Ruairi ruled Lewis in peace for the rest of his life (1596).

Upon the death of Ruairi MacLeod of The Lewes, the chieftainship of the clan passed to Torquil Dubh. In 1596 Torquil Dubh, with a force of seven or eight hundred men, devastated Torquil Connanach's lands of Coigach and the Mackenzie lands of Loch Broom. In consequence, Torquil Dubh was summoned to appear before the Privy Council and was declared a rebel when he failed to appear. Torquil Dubh was finally betrayed by the Brieve of Lewis, chief of the Morrisons of Ness. Once captured, the brieve sent Torquil Dubh to Coigach where he and his companions were beheaded by Torquil Connanach, on the orders of Kenneth Mackenzie of Kintail in July 1597. Following this, Lewis was commanded by Torquil Dubh's three young sons and his illegitimate brother Niall. The MacLeods of Lewis were also aided by the MacLeods of Harris and the Macleans.

Because the Mackenzies now had the title deeds of Lewis, the island was forfeited by the Act of Estates in 1597, which gave the Scottish Government an excuse to attempt the colonisation the island. After the conquest of Lewis by the Mackenzies, Niall MacLeod (brother of Torquil Dubh, his nephews and about thirty others took refuge on Bearasay in the mouth of Loch Roag on the west coast of Lewis. For almost three years the small group of MacLeods held out against the Mackenzies before being driven off. With the end of the line of the MacLeods of Lewis, the title Lord MacLeod was the second title of the Mackenzie, Earls of Cromartie. Also the chiefship of the MacLeods of Lewis has passed to the MacLeods of Rassay, who hold it to this day.

== History ==
=== 16th Century ===
The MacLeods of Raasay are descended from Malcolm MacLeod IX of Lewis who, about 1510, gave his second son, known as Calum Garbh (Malcolm the Stout), of his patrimony the islands of Raasay and Rona as well as the districts of Coigeach and Gairloch on the western mainland of Ross. The first MacLeod of Raasay (Mac Gillechaluim) was Malcolm Garbh MacLeod (c. 1503 – 1560). In 1532 we find Farquhar, Bishop of the Isles, had occasion to call to account MacNeil of Barra and "Mac Gillechalum callit of Raasay". In 1549 Dean Monro stated that "Raasay belonged to Mac Gillechalum by the sword and the Bishop of the Isles by heritage". Malcolm was married and had at least two sons, Alexander, and John. John was known as Iain na Tuaighe (John of the Axe), who carried off Janet, wife of his uncle Roderick MacLeod X of Lewis and afterwards married her. By Janet Mackenzie, John had several sons and a daughter. The sons died in the massacre in the island of Isay. Malcolm's son, Malcolm Og effectively became Laird of Raasay during the lifetime of his father when he received a Royal Charter, dated 20 July 1596, investing him with his father's lands. The description of Malcolm Og's death, like that of his brother John, survives in various manuscripts. On 11 August 1611 a ship cast anchor in Clachan Bay, Raasay. On board were Murdoch MacKenzie, son of John Roy MacKenzie IV of Gairloch, and several of his followers. In the ensuing fight all the MacLeods, including Malcolm Og, on board the ship was slain, including Malcolm Og. Several Mackenzies were also killed in the fight.

=== 17th century ===
John Garbh MacLeod, 7th of Raasay (c. 1625 – 1671, who was served heir to his father on 22 September 1648, was distinguished among all his contemporaries for his size and strength. He met his death by drowning in the Minch when returning from Lewis at Easter 1671. John Garbh was probably the last chieftain to live in Brochel Castle. The dating of Brochel has generally been regarded as 15th Century work, based on its ground plan and features of the stonework. Clearly it had a strategic position being on the main sea route from Kyle of Lochalsh to Lewis and looking out over to Applecross in Ross on the mainland. It would have been highly desirable to control the waters of the Inner Sound in those empire-building days.

=== 18th century ===
1745 – 1746 Jacobite uprising

Malcolm MacLeod, 10th of Raasay (c. 1691 – 1761) was a Jacobite, who, accompanied by his second son, Dr Murdoch MacLeod of Eyre, and his cousin Captain Malcolm MacLeod of Brae, joined Prince Charles Edward Stuart with 100 men. The chieftain had wisely taken the precaution to convey his estate to his eldest son John, so that whatever might be the outcome of the Jacobite Rising the Raasay estate would remain secure in the hands of a member of the family. After the battle of Culloden, Raasay managed to return to his estate, with some of his men.

In retribution for MacLeod of Raasay taking part at Culloden for the Jacobite cause, Government troops landed in Raasay, destroyed Raasay House and set fire to every house on the island. All cattle, horses and sheep were rounded up and appropriated, even the boats were confiscated. It is amazing to discover how well the island recovered from this orgy of destruction.

After the Battle of Culloden, Prince Charles Edward Stuart spent several weeks in the Highlands and Islands of Scotland avoiding capture with Government troops in pursuit. There was a price of 30,000 pounds on his head. Prince Charles hid for two days on Raasay but thinking the island too narrow and confined for the purpose of concealment, he departed on 2 July 1746.

==== Boswell and Johnsons Tour of the Hebrides ====
In Boswell's The Journal of a Tour to the Hebrides in 1773, we read that Raasay House was rebuilt "by this Raasay", John XI of Raasay. "His father was out in 1745 but had previously conveyed the estate to him so there was no forfeiture: but as the Prince was known to have had an asylum in Raasay, those employed under the Government burnt every house upon the island". Boswell continues, "It is really a place where one may live in plenty and even in luxury. This island has abundance of black cattle, sheep and goats; a good many horses, which are used for ploughing, carrying out dung, etc."

Dr Johnson in his work A Journey to the Western Isles, stated: "This is truly patriarchal life. This is what we came to find". The lexicographer found life in Raasay most agreeable. "Such a seat of hospitality amids the winds and waters fills the mind with a delightful contrariety of images with the rough ocean and howling storm without; within is plenty and elegance, beauty and gaiety, the song and the dance. In Raasay, if I could have found an Ulyssess, I had fancied a Phaeacia."

=== 19th Century ===
James MacLeod, 12th of Raasay (1761–1823) further improved the Raasay Estate and added to Raasay House. In 1805 he married Flora Ann, daughter of Lieutenant Colonel Maclean of Muck, with issue of four surviving sons and one daughter; John, Loudoun, James, Francis, and Hannah.

James died in 1823, and was succeeded by his eldest son, John MacLeod, 13th of Raasay. John was an officer in the 78th Highlanders, married Mary, only daughter of Sir Donald MacLeod of Varkasaig, a distinguished officer in the Indian Army.

Their only child, Mary Julia Hastings born 1836, died in 1839 and is buried in the small chapel behind Raasay House, where her memorial tablet can still be seen.

A change in farming practices combined with the disastrous summers of 1839 and 1840 and the failure of cropping efforts led to poverty and distress. The family moved further into debt by further additions to Raasay House. Tenant crofters couldn't pay rents, over-population put demands on all resources, and as with many other Landlords and Highland Clan chieftains, found themselves in financial difficulties. It was during this period that the region was affected with the Highland Clearances resulting in the mass depopulation of the Highlands of Scotland.

The Estate was sold to George Rainy in around 1843.

In the 19th century, the MacLeod of Raasay chieftains emigrated to Australia and then settled in Tasmania.

== Modern ==
The present chieftain of the MacLeods of Raasay is Roderick John MacLeod, 18th of Raasay, who lives in Tasmania, Australia. He is the brother of the present Chief of MacLeod of The Lewes.

== Profile ==
=== Origin of the Name ===
The clan surnames MacLeod and McLeod (and other variants) are Anglicisations of the Gaelic patronymic name Mac Leòid meaning "son of Leòd". This Gaelic name (Leòd) is a form of the Old Norse personal name Ljótr which means "ugly".

=== Clan Chieftains ===
MacLeod of Raasay Chiefains
Number	Name	Dates	Notes
1	Malcolm Garbh	1503 - 1560	Given patrimony of Raasay, Rona, Coigeach, Gairloch by Malcolm IX Lewis 1510
2	Alexander	1524 - 1565	
3	Malcolm	1545 - 1605	Married Isabel, daughter of Kenneth Mackenzie of Kintail
4	Malcolm Og	1566 - 1611	Received Royal Charter of his lands 1596.Lost Gairloch to Mackenzie. Killed Clachan Bay 1611
5	Alexander	1568 - 1643	
6	Alexander	1598 - 1648	Married Sibella daughter Roderick Mackenzie of Applecross
7	John Garbh	1625 - 1671	Married Janet, daughter Roderick Mor MacLeod of Dunvegan. Last to live at Brochel
8	Alexander	1627 - 1688	
9	Alexander	1670 -	
10	Malcolm	1691 - 1761	Led 100 Raasay men to Culloden. Conveyed estate to son John
11	John	1714 - 1786	Rebuilt Raasay House after Culloden. Boswell and John son visited Raasay 1773
12	James	1761 - 1823	Extended Raasay House. Married Flora, daughter of MacLean of Muck
13	John	1806 - 1860	Married Mary, daughter of Donald MacLeod. Sold Raasay in 1843. To Aust. 1846
14	James Gawler	1840 - 1880	Born South Australia. Unmarried, no children. Returned to England
15	Loudoun Hector	1862 - 1934	Born South Australia. Moved to Tasmania. Married Frances Bright
16	Torquil Bright	1889 - 1968	Born Tasmania. Married Christie Nicholas
17	Torquil Roderick	1919 - 2001	Born Tasmania. Married Mary, daughter of Harold Turner
18	Roderick John	1950 -	Born Tasmania. Married Elizabeth, daughter Kenneth Downie

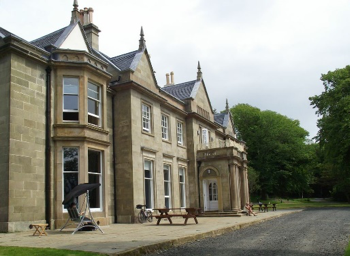
Raasay House, built as the Chiefs home in the early 1700s has undergone several upgrades and renovations since MacLeod ownership.

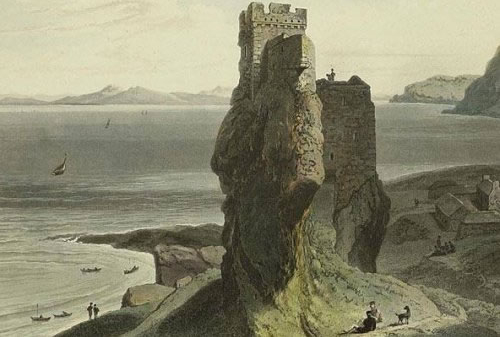
Castle Broichin on the Isle of Rassay, by William Daniell in 1819. Brochel Castle was built in the late 15th century or early 16th century, traditionally by MacGilleChaluim, first MacLeod chief of Raasay.

=== Castles ===
Castles that have belonged to the MacLeods of Raasay have included:

- Brochel Castle, a small and ruinous stronghold, seven miles of north of Clachan on Raasay, was held by the MacLeod of Raasay branch of the clan.
- Raasay House, built initially in the early 1700s as a small, laird's house by the MacLeods of Raasay. However, the new house itself had to be reconstructed only a year or so later, when redcoats plundered the island for the Chiefs support for Bonnie Prince Charlie at Culloden. Since then, the house has undergone several upgrades and renovations.

=== Symbolism ===
==== Crest badge ====
Note: the crest badge is made up of the chief's heraldic crest and motto.

- Chief's motto: Luceo non uro. (translation from Latin: "I burn but am not consumed", or "I shine, not burn").

==== Tartan ====
Tartan image	Description
MacLeod of Raasay tartan	The MacLeod of Raasay tartan is very similar to the MacLeod tartan found in the Vestiarium (pictured below) and is thought to be based on that sett. It is therefore considered to date from sometime later than 1829. Alternatively its inclusion in the records of the Highland Society of London may indicate an earlier origin. In this alternative scenario the yellow "Vestiarium" tartan would trace its origin to the earlier Raasay sett.

== See also ==
- Clan MacLeod of Lewis
- Clan MacLeod
