= Malcolm MacLeod (clan chief) =

Scottish clan chief

- Born: 1296
- Died: 1370; Castle of Stornoway, Lewis
- Resting place: Iona
- Known for: The 3rd Chief of Clan MacLeod
- Predecessor: Tormod (father)
- Successor: Iain Ciar (son)
- Spouse: possibly 2
- Children: 4 sons

Malcolm MacLeod (Scottish Gaelic: Gille Caluim MacLeòid) (1296–1370) is considered to be the 3rd Chief of Clan MacLeod. He was the son of Tormod. Malcolm and his kinsman Torquil are the first MacLeod chiefs to appear in contemporary records. Clan tradition states he was the greatest hero of the clan and links him to the origin of the clan relic known as Sir Rory Mor's Horn. He is said to have become extremely overweight in his old age and was known as 'Good Fat Malcolm' or 'Malcolm the thick-legged'. According to tradition he was buried at Iona. Malcolm's son, Iain Ciar MacLeod, succeeded him as chief of the clan.

== Life ==
Malcolm has traditionally been said to have been the son of Tormod, second chief of Clan MacLeod. The traditional view was that Tormod was a grandson of Leod, founder of the clan; that Tormod's father, also named Tormod, died before Leod, and thus when Leod died the chiefship skipped his generation. The current view is that the 'middle' Tormod did not exist and that Malcolm was the son of Tormod, and thus the grandson of Leod. According to early 20th-century clan historian R.C. MacLeod, Malcolm was born in 1296 and succeeded his father in the year 1320. Malcolm and his kinsman Torquil are the first MacLeod chiefs to appear in contemporary records. Their names are recorded as "Malcolme, son to Tormode M'Cloyde", and that of "Torkyll M'Cloyd", in a royal charter dating to about 1343, during the reign of David II (r. 1329–1371).

The Bannatyne manuscript is the main authority for information on the early chiefs of Clan MacLeod. This traditional account of the clan is thought to date to about the 1830s. The document describes Malcolm as the greatest hero of all MacLeods and states that he married a daughter of Sir Neil Campbell of Lochow, ancestor of the Dukes of Argyll. According to 19th-century historian A. Mackenzie, Malcolm married Martha, daughter of the Earl of Mar. R.C. MacLeod speculated that this earl was "the seventh" and considered it not impossible that Malcolm could have married both women. MacLeod noted that both marriages would have had close links to the family of Robert the Bruce; both Sir Neil, and Lord Mar, had married sisters of Bruce (Mary Bruce and Christina Bruce).

According to one tradition, Sir Rory Mor's Horn, originated with Malcolm's victorious encounter with the terrorising bull from Glenelg.

According to clan tradition, Malcolm was both brave and strong. The manuscript tells a tale of how Malcolm returned from a tryst with the Campbell wife of the chief of the Frasers who possessed part of the lands of Glenelg. That night Malcolm encountered a bull which lived in the woods of Glenelg and which had terrorised the local inhabitants. Armed with only a dirk, Malcolm slew the bull and broke off one of its horns. He then carried off the horn to Dunvegan as a trophy of his prowess. For this act of valour, Fraser's wife forsook her husband for Malcolm; thus starting a lengthy clan feud between the Frasers and the MacLeods. The tradition runs that ever since the horn has remained at Dunvegan and that it had since been converted into a drinking horn, which each chief must drain to the bottom in one draught. The manuscript continues that ever since Malcolm defeated the bull, the family of MacLeod of MacLeod have used a bull's head as their heraldic crest, with the motto "hold fast". Today the crest of the MacLeods of MacLeod contains a bull and the clan possesses a drinking horn, known as Sir Rory Mor's Horn (pictured left), which is said to be the horn of clan tradition—it is located in Dunvegan Castle with other heirlooms.

The manuscript states that in his old age, Malcolm became extremely overweight, and for this he was known as "Callum Reamhar Math" (Good Fat Malcolm). It also noted the within the 1767 memorial, he is known as "Malcolm Coise Reamhar" ("the thick-legged"). It states that he died in the castle of Stornoway while visiting his kinsman, MacLeod of Lewis; and that he was laid to rest on the isle of Iona, beside his father.

== Issue ==
The Bannatyne manuscript states that Malcolm had four sons—John, his heir; Tormod; Murdo; and Malcolm Og. Tormod, the second son, lived in Bernera, Harris. His descendants lived there until the time of Sir Rory Mor; the writer of the manuscript also notes that at the top of writing, Tormod's descendants lived on Pabbay and called themselves "Clan Vic Gillecallam cas Reamhar Vic Leod". Malcolm's third son, Murdo, was left the lands of Glenelg; his descendants held onto these lands for several generations and were known as the MacLeods of Gesto. The head of the Gesto branch was always called "Mac Vic Tormod". The fourth son of Malcolm, Malcolm Og, married a daughter of MacDuffie of Colonsay and settled in Argyll. The manuscript states that the general belief amongst MacCallums was that Malcolm Og was their founding ancestor. However, the writer of the manuscript notes another possible origin for the MacCallums, which he had learned from another source. The manuscript states that Malcolm fathered six illegitimate sons with his Campbell lover (who had left her Fraser husband). These children then lived in their mother's native Argyll and considered themselves a sept of the Campbells. The writer of the manuscript states that according to his source, the oldest senachies of the MacCallums traced their descent from these illegitimate sons of Malcolm.

== See also ==
- Sir Rory Mor's Horn, tradition links the horn to Malcolm
