= Sir Rory Mor's Horn =

Heirloom of the chiefs of Clan MacLeod

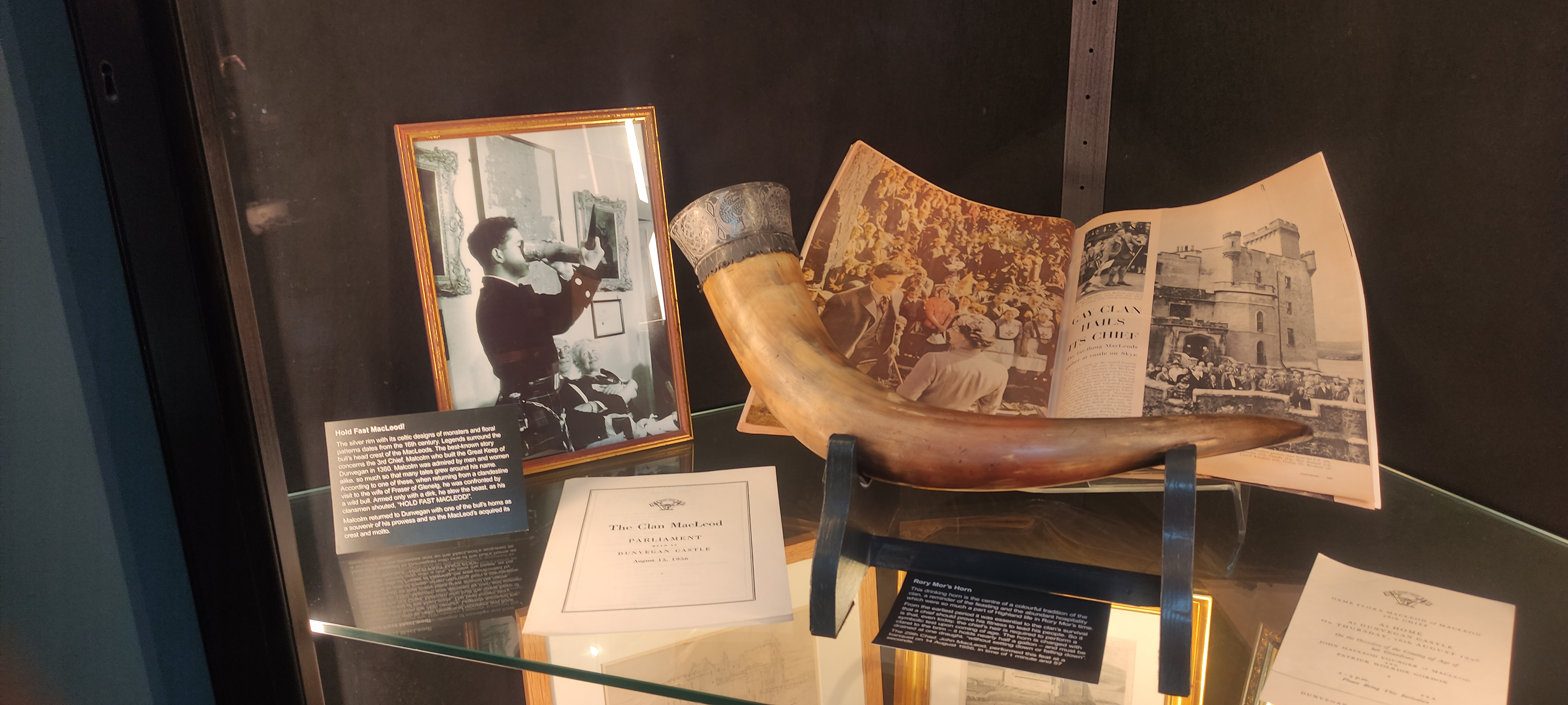
Rory Mor's horn in Dunvegan Castle, in the picture - John MacLeod the 29th chief of the clan who was the last chief to drink from the horn, draining it in 1 minute and 57 seconds

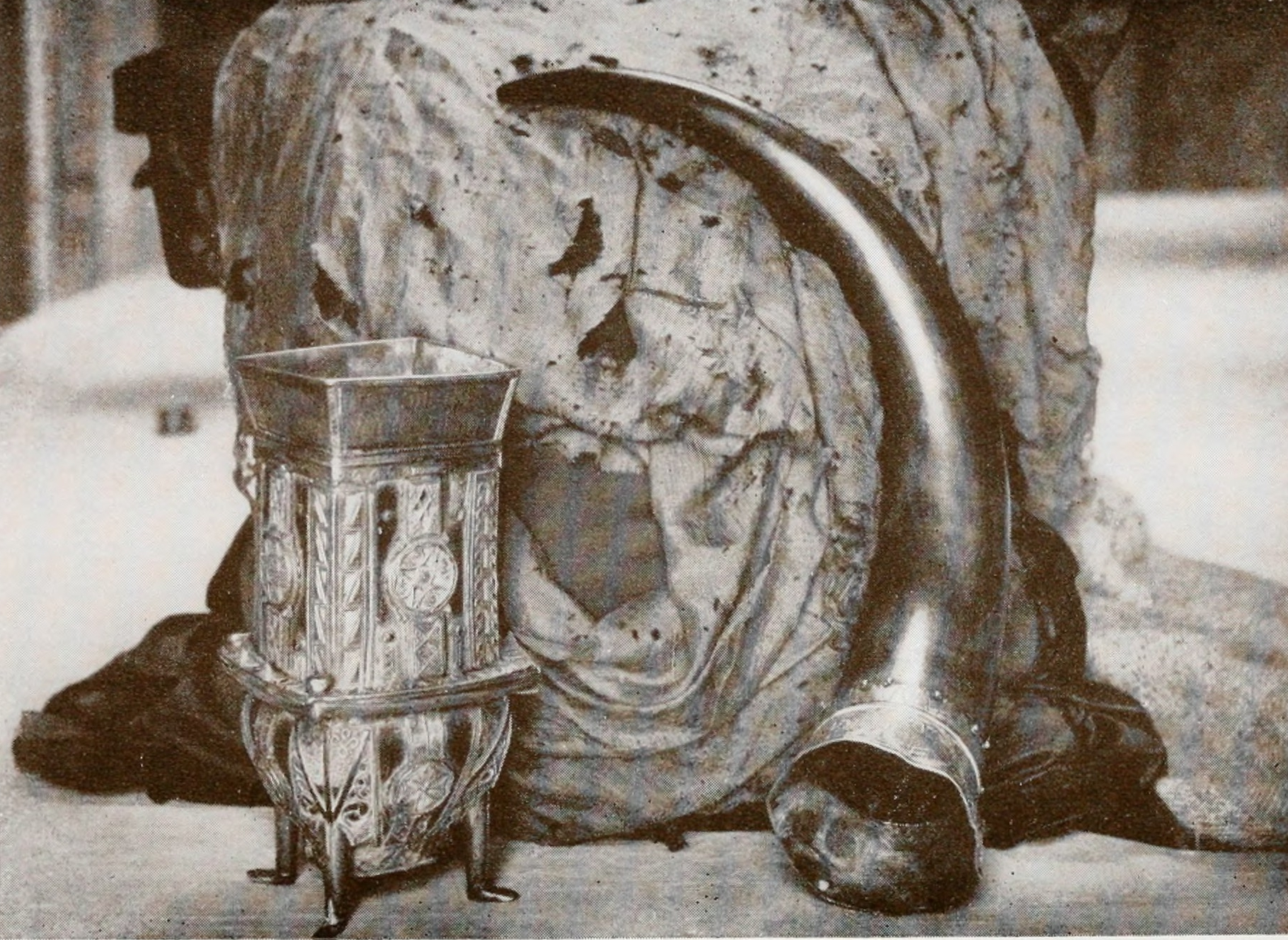
Photo of the Dunvegan Cup, Fairy Flag, and Sir Rory Mor's Horn, sometime before 1927.

Sir Rory Mor's Horn is a drinking horn, one of several heirlooms of the MacLeods of Dunvegan, chiefs of Clan MacLeod. Clan custom is that each successive chief is to drink a full measure of the horn in wine to prove his manhood. The artwork on the horn has been dated to the 16th century, and by some as far back as the 10th century. The MacLeod chiefs have several other notable heirlooms kept at Dunvegan Castle, such as the Fairy Flag and the Dunvegan Cup (pictured right).

== Description and custom ==
Patterned medallion

Sir Rory Mor's Horn

Sir Rory Mor's Horn is a drinking horn, made of an ox's horn, tipped in silver. The rim around the mouth of the horn is thick and on this there are imprinted seven medallions. On three of the medallions are beasts, on three others are patterns, and on the seventh and joining medallion is both a pattern and a beast. R. C. MacLeod considered the work to be Norse, and declared the horn to date from the 10th century. The horn holds about two imperial pints (1.1 litres). Clan MacLeod custom is that each successive chief, on achieving the age of manhood, should drain, in one draught, the horn which is filled to the brim. The horn is named after Sir Ruairidh Mòr MacLeòid (c. 1562–1626), the 15th chief of Clan MacLeod.

There have been differing opinions concerning the age of the horn. In 1927, R. C. MacLeod declared his opinion that it dated from the 10th century. Professor Brögger, from Oslo, thought it was of Norse origin, dating from the 10th century. Professor Callander, from Edinburgh, considered it to be not unfamiliar with other objects of Scotland, and dated it to the 16th century.

In 1906, R. C. MacLeod noted that the greater proportion of the horn had been filled in, and that it was "but a moderate drink the present day Chiefs have to quaff. With what contempt, what might scorn would these stern warriors of the past look upon the puny performances of their descendants". In 1956, Elizabeth II and Prince Philip visited Dunvegan Castle. During this occasion, John, maternal grandson of the clan chief Dame Flora MacLeod of MacLeod, was challenged to quaff the horn which was filled with claret—which he did in one minute 57 seconds.

== Tradition ==
The Macleod's crest badge contains the bull's head and the motto "hold fast".

The Bannatyne manuscript dates from about 1830 and is thought to have probably been written by Dr. William MacLeod Bannatyne. R. C. MacLeod noted that the manuscript contains a tradition concerning the origin of the horn. This tradition runs that one night, Malcolm (1296–1370), the 3rd chief of Clan Macleod, returned from a tryst with the Campbell wife of the chief of the Frasers who possessed the lands of Glenelg. That night Malcolm encountered a bull which lived in the woods of Glenelg and which had terrorised the local inhabitants. Armed with only a dirk, Malcolm slew the bull and broke off one of its horns. Malcolm carried off the horn to Dunvegan, as a trophy of his prowess. For this act of valour, Fraser's wife forsook her husband for Malcolm, thus starting a lengthy clan feud between the Frasers and the MacLeods. The tradition runs that ever since Malcolm's slaying the bull the horn has remained at Dunvegan; and was converted into a drinking horn, which each chief must drain to the bottom in one draught. The manuscript continues that ever since Malcolm defeated the bull, the family of MacLeod have used a bull's head as their heraldic crest, with the motto "hold fast".

R.C. MacLeod noted another tradition concerning a bull and motto of the clan's chiefs (though not the drinking horn). The tradition runs that one day Tormod (c. 1509–1584), 12th chief of Clan MacLeod was being entertained by Argyll, chief of Clan Campbell, at Inveraray Castle. (Note: R. C. MacLeod considered Tormod as the 11th chief of the clan. The current view is that he was the 12th chief.) During his visit, the MacLeod chief learned that one of his clansmen was a convicted criminal who had condemned to be gored to death by a bull. The MacLeod chief appealed to Argyll, but the Campbell chief replied that it was too late and that nothing could save the MacLeod clansman. The MacLeod chief then sprang into the ring, armed with only his dirk, and attacked the bull. He grabbed hold of the bull's horns and cried out "hold fast!" and saved the clansman.

The Skeabost Horn, which was the trophy awarded to the champions of the Southern League in the sport of shinty is based on the horn of Rory Mor. The Horn is no longer competed for but is in the possession of Jack Asher.

== Sources ==
- MacLeod, Fred T. (1912–13). "Notes on the Relics preserved in Dunvegan Castle, Skye, and the Heraldry of the Family of MacLeod of MacLeod" (PDF). Proceedings of the Society of Antiquaries of Scotland. 47. Archived from the original (PDF) on 11 June 2007.
- MacLeod, Roderick Charles (1906). The MacLeods. Edinburgh: Clan MacLeod Society.
- MacLeod, Roderick Charles (1927). The MacLeods of Dunvegan. Edinburgh: Privately printed for the Clan MacLeod Society.
- Wilson, Daniel (1851). The Archaeology and Prehistoric Annals of Scotland. Edinburgh: Sutherland and Knox.
