= Màiri nighean Alasdair Ruaidh =

Scottish Gaelic poet

Màiri nighean Alasdair Ruaidh (c.1615 – c.1707), also known as Mary Macleod, was a Scottish Gaelic poet.

== Life ==
Born at Rowdil, Harris, she was a daughter of Red Alasdair, and through him connected with the chiefs of the Macleods. In one of her poems, she claims to have nursed five lairds of the Macleods and two lairds of Applecross. Most of her life was spent at Dunvegan, Skye, in the Macleod of Macleod household, although tradition mentions she once lived in Eriskay. At one time, however, she was exiled by her chief to Mull for being too profuse in her praise of his relative, Sir Norman Macleod of Bernera. She was afterwards recalled to Dunvegan and died there in 1674.

== Works ==
Only a few of her poems, mostly laudations of the Macleods, have been preserved.

Macleod is widely regarded as one of the stalwarts of the new school of poetry that was emerging in the 17th century, which eventually replaced the classical Gaelic bards.

The 1893 Encyclopædia Britannica states: "Macleod’s poetry is celebrated for its simple, natural rhythms. Her poems were full of the imagery that was customary in the verse of the bardic poets. Macleod's poems were mostly exalted tales of the heroic deeds of the Macleod family, woven with her strong love for her family... A handful of her poems remains today. Of those that survive, the elegies are the best, poignant yet fresh in their style."

== Folklore ==
MacLeod is also referenced in Scottish folklore as composing her poetry neither indoors nor outdoors and that she would croon from the threshold.

== Legacy ==
The piobaireachd Cumha Màiri Nighean Alasdair Ruaidh (Lament for Mary MacLeod) was composed in her memory. It is traditionally attributed to Patrick Mòr MacCrimmon but, as he pre-deceased her by some decades, more likely to have been by Patrick Òg MacCrimmon.
