= Iain Ciar MacLeod =

Scottish clan chief

- Born: 1330
- Died: c. 1392; Rodel, Harris
- Cause of death: Wounds sustained in battle
- Resting place: Iona, Scotland
- Known for: The 4th Chief of Clan MacLeod
- Predecessor: Malcolm (father)
- Successor: William Cleireach (second son)
- Spouse: unknown O'Neil
- Children: 2 sons; 4 daughters; 3 illegitimate daughters

Iain Ciar MacLeod (Scottish Gaelic: Iain Ciar MacLeòid) (1330 – c. 1392) is considered to be 4th Chief of Clan MacLeod. He was the eldest son of, and is thought to have succeeded his father, Malcolm, in the years spanning 1360–1370. Clan tradition states that he was the most tyrannical of all MacLeod chiefs. His wife supposedly was as cruel as he was; she is said to have had two of her daughters buried alive in the dungeon of Dunvegan Castle when they attempted to leave the clan. Iain Ciar was killed in an ambush in about 1392. He was succeeded by his second and only surviving son, William Cleireach.

== Life ==
According to the twentieth-century clan historian, R.C. MacLeod, Iain Ciar is estimated to have been born in the year 1330, or possibly later; he was the eldest child and succeeded his father, Malcolm, sometime between the years 1360 and 1370. The early nineteenth century Bannatyne manuscript states that he received a charter from Robert II, for the lands of Trotternish and all his other lands on Skye—although MacLeod noted that he could not find any evidence for the said charter. The manuscript states that Iain Ciar was said to have been "the most tyrannical and bloodthirsty despot, equally feared and hated by all his vassals, and by the members of his own family". It continues that he married the daughter of an Irish O'Neil chieftain and that she was just as cruel as her husband. For example, the manuscript tells that when she discovered that two of her daughters were about to escape her tyranny with their lovers (two MacQueen brothers from Roag), she had the brothers flogged to death, their bodies thrown into the sea, and her two daughters were buried alive within the dungeon of Dunvegan Castle.

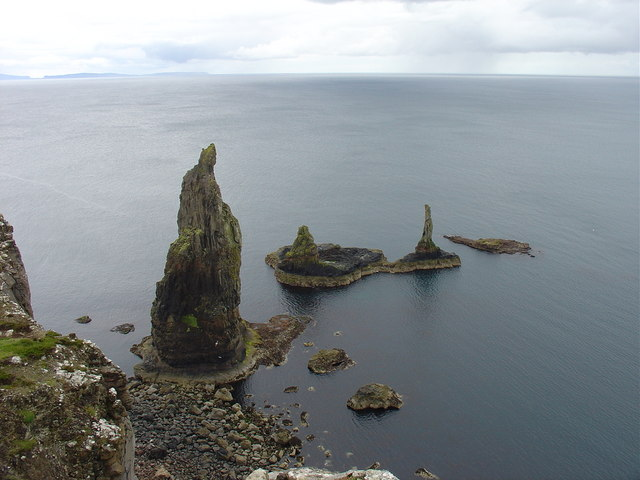
MacLeod's Maidens, Skye, where the wife and three illegitimate daughters of Iain Ciar were said to have perished

The manuscript relates a story in which Iain Ciar was hunting deer with the leading men of his clan. The forest on Harris, in which they hunted, was owned in ancient times by Clan Vic Ghitthich ("the children of the Wolf") and still was partially possessed by the family, although they paid tribute to MacLeod. During the hunt, Iain Ciar expressed his anger that they had not come across the white stag that was known to live in the area; the MacLeod chief offered a large reward to whoever could discover the offender who had killed the animal. An enemy of the MacGhitthich chief put the blame on MacGhitthich and in consequence, Iain Ciar had MacGhitthich cruelly put to death by forcing the antlers of a large deer into his bowels. When the hunting party returned to Rodel, intending to set sail for Dunvegan, the vengeful MacGhitthiches attacked the MacLeods. Iain Ciar was struck by an arrow. His son, William Cleireach managed to rally his clan and fend off the attackers. Iain Ciar's wife, three of his illegitimate daughters, and other women, fled the hostilities in a galley. The ship was, however, blown out to sea and across The Minch, before it was dashed to pieces against rocks, which the manuscript describes as being called "the Maidens". The wounded Iain Ciar was taken to the church at Rodel, where he died that evening. His body was taken to Iona where it was buried. He was succeeded by his surviving son, William Cleireach. The late nineteenth-century historian A. MacKenzie stated that Iain Ciar died shortly after the ascension of Robert III; MacLeod thought that he was killed in the year 1392.

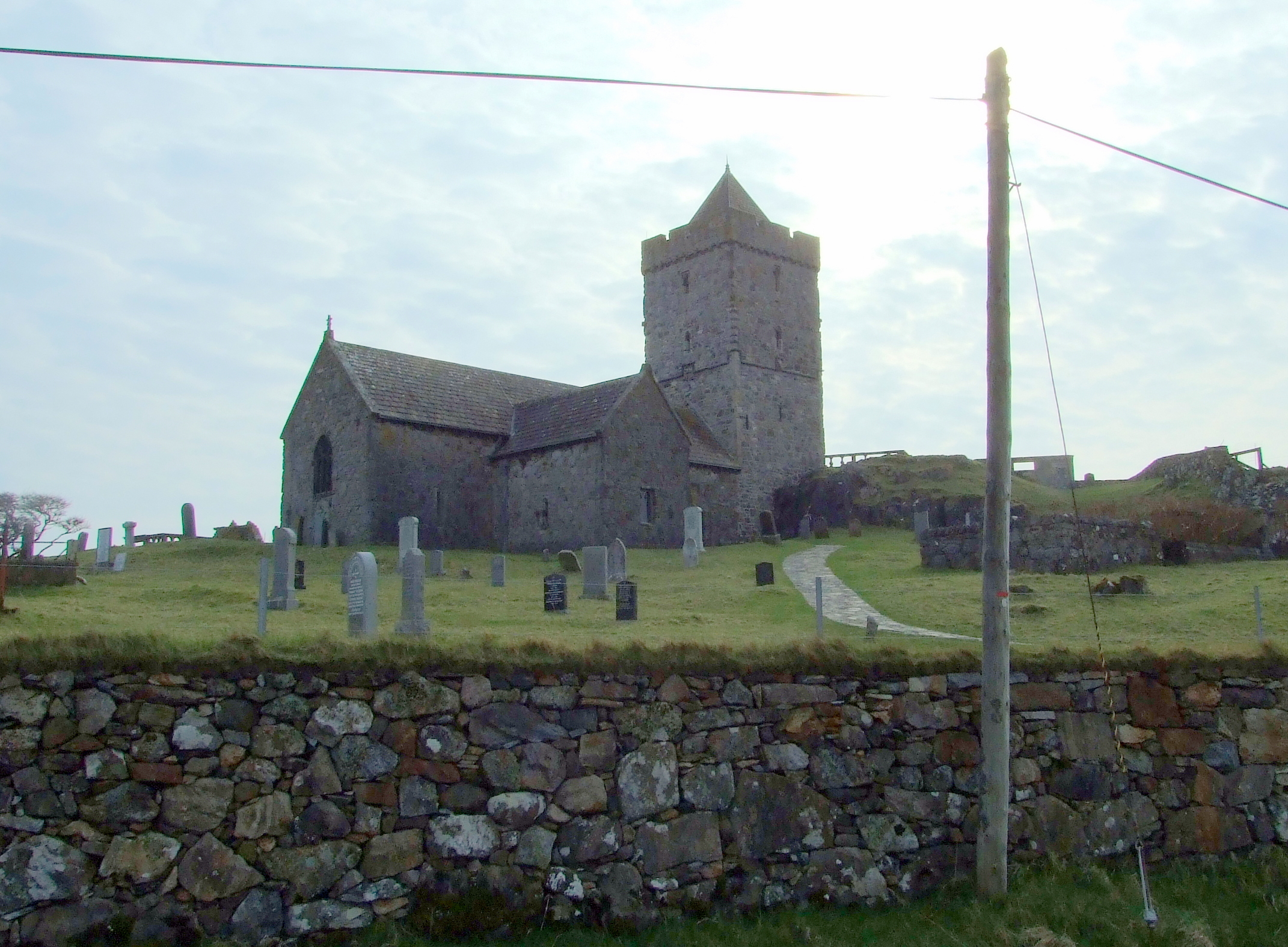
Church of St Clement, Rodel, Harris, where tradition states the wounded Iain Ciar was taken before he died

The Bannatyne manuscript states that the first seven chiefs of Clan MacLeod were buried at Iona. The choir of Iona Abbey, for the most part, dates from the early sixteenth century. Within the centre of the choir there is a large stone which once contained a monumental brass, traditionally said to have been a MacLeod marker. The stone formed a matrix which at one time contained the brass inlay (tradition states that it was a silver inlay). It is the largest carved stone on the island, measuring 7 feet 9.25 inches (2.37 m) by 3 feet 10 inches (1.17 m). R. C. MacLeod speculated that perhaps Leod and five of his successors were buried beneath—however, in his opinion Iain Ciar was buried elsewhere.

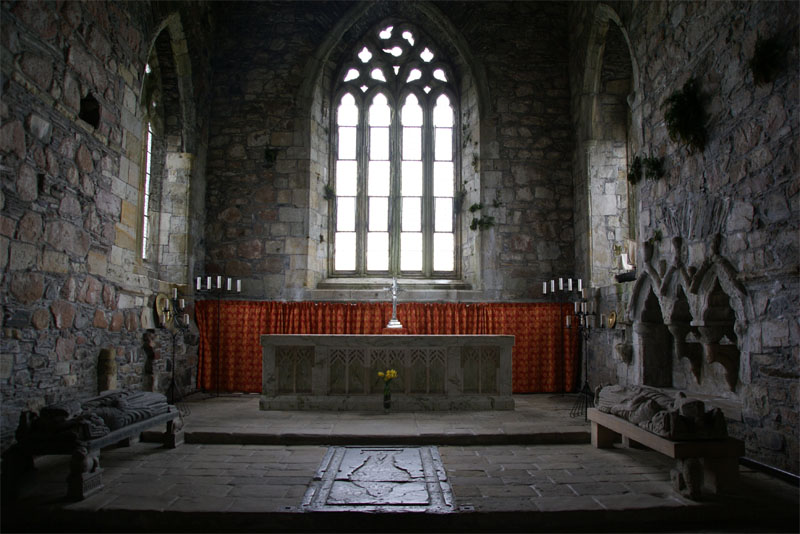
The choir of Iona Abbey; The stone said to represent a MacLeod is visible on the floor in the middle; the effigy on the left (north) is of a Mackinnon, the one on the right is a Mackenzie

MacLeod stated that there was another MacLeod tombstone on Iona, which was supposed to have been the stone of a sixteenth-century MacLeod of Lewis. In spite of this, MacLeod speculated that this stone was in fact that of Iain Ciar; since, in his opinion, Iain Ciar was too wicked a man to have been buried in the family vault with his predecessors. MacLeod transcribed the stone and considered the Latin short-form to represent: "Here lies the body of the distinguished John Dominus M'Leoid", as well as the date, "1414". He also noted that the stone bears a coat of arms and described it as containing a lymphad, below which were four animals standing erect. The two animals on the left were facing one another and MacLeod thought they could be lions. The third animal he considered to be a stag; the fourth MacLeod could not identify, though he supposed it could represent some heraldic device from his wife, who was of the Irish O'Neil dynasty.

== Issue ==
According to the Bannatyne manuscript, Iain Ciar and his O'Neil wife had two sons, four daughters. It also records that he had three illegitimate daughters who were killed with his wife. The eldest son, Malcolm, was killed at a feast on Lewis where he intended to wed the daughter of his kinsman. A fight broke out during the feast, however, and both he and his kinsman were slain. In consequence, bitterness was felt between the two branches—Sìol Torcaill and Sìol Tormoid—for some time afterward. Iain Ciar's second son, William, was intended to be trained for the church, and was known as "a Cleireach", the clerk. He ended up succeeding his father.

The manuscript states that one of Iain Ciar's daughters married Lachlan MacLean of Duart and another married Cameron of Locheil—both had issue. Two were murdered, as noted above, before marriage.
