= Tormod MacLeod =

Scottish clan chief

- Resting place: Iona (according to tradition)
- Known for: The 2nd Chief of Clan MacLeod
- Predecessor: Leod (father)
- Successor: Malcolm (son)
- Children: at least two sons

Tormod MacLeod, sometimes referred to as Norman MacLeod, (Scottish Gaelic: Tormod MacLeòid, and Tormod mac Leòd) (fl. late 13th century) was a west Highland lord, and son of Leod, the traditional founder and eponymous ancestor of Clan MacLeod. Little is known about Tormod; like his father Leod, he does not appear in any contemporary records. His name is remembered today in the Scottish Gaelic name Sìol Thormoid ("seed of Tormod"), used by a branch of his descendants, the MacLeods of Dunvegan, who are chiefs of Clan MacLeod.

== Biography ==
Tormod was a son of Leod, the traditional founder and eponymous ancestor of Clan MacLeod. Tormod, just Like his father, does not appear in any contemporary records. The earliest contemporary record to a MacLeod chief dates to the generation after Tormod, during the reign of David II (r. 1329–1371).

The Bannatyne manuscript is a traditional history of Clan MacLeod, dating from the early 19th century. It is the main authority for the information on the early chiefs of Clan MacLeod. It makes several references to Tormod and makes him a grandson of Leod. The early 20th-century historian R.C. MacLeod thought it possible that Tormod had a father also named Tormod, who died before Leod. MacLeod stated that this father married the daughter of an Irish chieftain named M'Crotan. The current view by modern historians is that Tormod was, however, not a grandson, but the son of Leod. The Bannatyne manuscript states that Tormod was considered to be one of the greatest soldiers of his era; that it was said he fought at the Battle of Bannockburn. It relates that Tormod held the office of sheriff of Skye, and of "the Long Island". It describes how Tormod lived to a great age and was traditionally said to have had a white beard, which was so long that he had to tuck it into his girdle. The manuscript rounds out Tormod's life by stating that he died at his castle on Pabbay and was buried alongside his grandfather at Iona.

The manuscript states that Tormod had three sons by his wife—Malcolm, Leod, and Godfrey. The manuscript relates that Leod was said to have followed Bruce to Ireland, where Leod was killed without an heir; and that Godfrey was a monk and died abroad. Tormod was succeeded by his eldest son, Malcolm. The late 20th-century historian William Matheson considered the Bannatyne manuscript to be of dubious authority, as it is the only source for the sons Leod and Godrey and it made no mention of the son Murdoch. This Murdoch was an important son and a glaring omission since he is considered to have been the father of Torquil, founder of the MacLeods of Lewis who are known in Scottish Gaelic as Sìol Torcaill ("seed of Torcall").

== See also ==
- Torquil MacLeod, a grandson of Tormod, though according to tradition he was a younger brother of Tormod
