= Leod =

Founder of Clan MacLoed

- Born: c. 1200
- Died: 1280
- Resting place: Iona (according to tradition)
- Known for: The 1st Chief of Clan MacLeod
- Successor: Tormod (son)
- Children: at least one son (several sons and daughters according to tradition)
- Relatives: Foster son of Páll Bálkason (according to tradition)

Leod (Scottish Gaelic: Leòd; Old Norse: Ljótr) (c. 1200 – 1280) was the eponymous ancestor and founder of Clan MacLeod and Clan MacLeod of Lewis. Almost nothing is known about him and he does not appear in any contemporary records. Tradition dating to the late 18th century made him a son of Olaf the Black who was King of Man (r. 1225–1237). Heraldic evidence, dating to the late 17th century, is considered to be the earliest evidence of descent from Olaf the Black. However, in recent years, this traditional lineage has been challenged and is no longer considered fact by one historian.

According to Clan MacLeod tradition, Leod inherited some of his lands from a foster father, who was a sheriff of the Hebridean island of Skye; other lands he inherited from his father-in-law, who was also a lord on Skye. MacLeod tradition also states that Leod was the father of four sons and two daughters. Two of these sons founded the two main branches of MacLeods; branches which exist to this day—Tormod (from whom the MacLeods of Harris and Dunvegan descend) and Torquil (from whom the MacLeods of Lewis descend). The traditional belief that Torquil was a son has also been challenged; the current understanding is that he was a great-grandson of Leod. In recent years, the DNA evidence of men bearing surnames equating to MacLeod has revealed that a certain proportion share a common ancestor—an ancestor considered to have been the clan's founder.

== Traditional ancestry ==
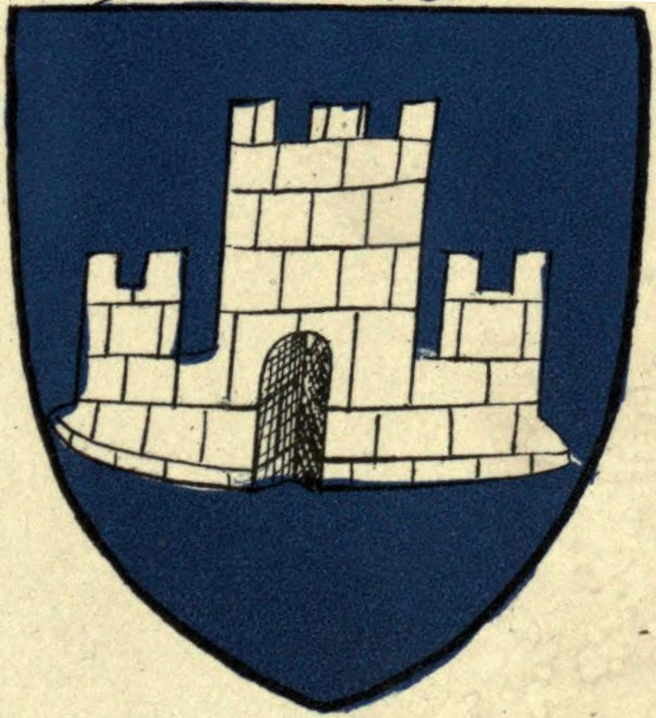
The coat of arms of the MacLeods of Harris, recorded in a mid-15th century armorial. (Note: This is the 'MacLeod of Harris and Dunvegan' coat of arms which appears in the mid 15th century roll of arms Armorial de Berry (the roll actually lists the arms as those of "Le sire de bes"). The blazon is: azure, a castle triple-towered argent. The castle may represent the seat of the chiefs—Dunvegan Castle, located on Skye. The MacLeods did not add the Manx triskelion to their arms until hundreds of years after this roll was created.)

The present arms of MacLeod of MacLeod.

According to MacLeod tradition, Leod is the eponymous ancestor of the clan. However, little to nothing is known about this man; he does not appear in any contemporary records. The earliest historical record of a MacLeod chief occurs almost a century after he is thought to have flourished—when the names of "Malcolme, son to Tormode M'Cloyde", and that of "Torkyll M'Cloyd", appear in a royal charter during the reign of David II, King of Scots (r. 1329–1371). Until quite recently, Leod has generally been considered to have been the son of Olaf the Black, King of Mann and the Isles (r. 1225–1237).

This traditional ancestry may be traced to the late 17th century when a chief adopted the designation of "McOlaus" and another was the first MacLeod to incorporate the royal Manx arms into MacLeod heraldry. In a document dating to 1630, Iain Mòr MacLeod of Dunvegan (chief 1626–1649) appears as "John McOlaus of Dunvegane"—McOlaus representing MacOlaf. This chief's son, Iain Breac (chief 1664–1693), is the first MacLeod to have incorporated the Manx triskelion into his coat of arms. The triskelion was borne in the arms of the kings of Mann and the Isles as far back as the 13th century. (Note: The royal arms of the Kingdom of Mann are derived from the emblem of the 10th century Manx dynasty. These arms appear in several mediaeval armorials, such as the English Walford's Roll, and Camden Roll, as well as the French Wijbergen Roll. Within the Camden Roll they appear illustrated as gules, three mailed legs embowed, and conjoined at the thighs, argent; the original Norman French blazon reads "l'escu de gules, a treis iambes armes".) The earliest known arms borne by the MacLeods of Harris and Dunvegan (pictured top-right) are, however, quite different the royal Manx arms. These earliest MacLeod arms date to the mid-15th century; recorded in a leading European armorial known as the Armorial de Berry. Accordingly, it has been suggested that these points show that 17th-century belief of a descent from Olaf was not one of long standing.

There are various other points which cast serious doubt on Leod's traditional ancestry. In 1265, Magnus, King of Mann, the last king of this Manx dynasty died. Later in 1275, Magnus's illegitimate son, Godfrey died while leading a revolt. At least two women later came forward with claims for the kingdom—yet Leod and his sons did not. According to W.D.H. Sellar, it is hard to believe that a descendant of the royal line would not have put forward a claim. Another point put forward is that the MacLeods did not adopt the royal names of the 13th century Manx dynasty—names such as Godfrey (Old Norse: Guðrøðr; Gaelic: Gofraid), Ranald (Old Norse Rögnvaldr; Gaelic: Raghnall), Olaf (Old Norse Óláfr; Gaelic Amlaíb), and Harald (Old Norse Haraldr; Gaelic Aralt). Sellar illustrated his point by noting the royal names adopted by the descendants of Somerled (d. 1164) and his wife Ragnhild, daughter of Olaf the Red (grandfather of Olaf the Black).

In the 17th century, George Mackenzie, 1st Earl of Cromartie wrote a history of the Mackenzies, which included a genealogy of the MacLeods of Lewis (from whom he was also descended). Cromartie's genealogy listed Leod as a son of Harald, son of Godred Donn. Later genealogies, however, made Leod a son of Olaf the Black—genealogies found in Sir Robert Douglas of Glenbervie's Baronage of Scotland, of 1798; and the Bannatyne manuscript, which dates to about 1830. In the Baronage of Scotland, Glenbervie stated that he had obtained information from the MacLeods of Dunvegan which was allegedly based upon information found within the mediaeval Chronicles of Mann and William Camden's 17th century Britannia—however, neither of these two works make any mention of Leod at all. In 1977, historian William Matheson rejected the traditional descent from Olaf the Black on the basis that it is unsupported by any facts whatsoever, and that it is also contradicted by earlier, more authentic, Gaelic-language genealogies.

=== Traditional genealogies reconsidered ===
The four relevant pedigrees concerning the ancestry of Leod (click to enlarge).

In recent years, several historians have noted that within the Gaelic-language genealogies and praise-poetry concerning the MacLeods, Leod's great-grandfather's name appears to equate to the Old Norse Ölvir, Olvér; rather than the Old Norse Óláfr. There are considered to be four significant Gaelic-language genealogies which concern Leod's ancestry. These pedigrees roughly agree with one another in the three generations after Leod. The greatest similarity between these genealogies are the names of Leod's great-grandfather, variously spelt Oilmoir, Olbair Snaige, Olbuir Snaithe, and Olbair Snoice. Taking into account variances in spelling, these names are now considered to represent the literary Gaelic Olbhar, and the vernacular Gaelic Olghair; both which are in turn forms of Ölvir.

Matheson proposed that when Camden published his Britannia which included an account of the kings of Mann, genealogists saw the Latin Olavus (a Latin form of the Old Norse Óláfr) and concluded that it represented the Gaelic name Olbhar, Olghair. However, the Scottish Gaelic form of Olaf, Olavus, Olaus, Óláfr, is in fact Amhlaoibh, and the more modern Amhlaidh. Matheson further proposed that Leod's father's name also equates to Ölvir. So in Matheson's opinion, genealogists mistakenly attached Leod's father and great-grandfather to the Manx king Olaf the Black and his own grandfather, Olaf the Red. While Matheson's identification of the name of Leod's grandfather is now accepted, Sellar later disagreed with him on the name of Leod's father; proposing instead that it was more likely the Gaelic name Gillemuire—a name which appears on one of the four Gaelic-language genealogies.

The ancestry and some of the relatives of Olvir Rosta, according to the Orkneyinga saga.

Leod's name is represented in Scottish Gaelic as Leòd. This name is a Gaelic form of the Old Norse Ljótr, meaning "ugly". Matheson stated that this Norse name was rare in both Scandinavia and Iceland. He noted that in Scotland it was peculiar to the MacLeods, though it is almost never used within the clan. Matheson speculated that Leod's great-grandfather would have likely flourished at about the same time as Olvir Rosta was supposedly exiled to the Outer Hebrides. Matheson went even further and proposed that Leod's great-grandfather was in fact Olvir Rosta—a character from the mediaeval Orkneyinga saga. Matheson noted that while the name Ljótr is rare, Olvir Rosta's maternal grandfather appears in the saga as Ljótr níðingr ('Ljótr Villain'). In Matheson's opinion, since the Gaelic-language genealogies are inconsistent in the generations further back than Leod's great-grandfather, this may show that the man was a newcomer in the area. Sellar, however, rejected Matheson's proposal, commenting that such evidence was entirely circumstantial. Sellar stated that Olvir was not such a rare name; also, Olvir Rosta's genealogy and family within the saga (see above right) has no similarity with that recorded in the Gaelic-language genealogies relevant to Leod.

In contrast to Matheson's opinion about the name Ljótr, the 20th-century historian A. Morrison was of the opinion that the name may not be as rare as some people have thought. Morrison noted that the 19th century antiquary F.W.L. Thomas considered another saga character to be an eponymous ancestor of the MacLeods—this character was Ljótólfr, who would have lived on Lewis about a century before Leod's time. Morrison considered it possible that Leod's name could have ultimately originated from that of Ljótólfr's; however, while he considered it possible that Ljótólfr could have been an ancestor of Leod, he did not think it could have been in the male-line.

== Leod in clan tradition ==
=== Clans Mackenzie and Ross ===
The first earl of Cromartie's 17th century genealogical account of the MacLeods relates how Leod ("Leodus") was a son of Harald, son of Godred Donn. When the Isle of Man passed into the possession of the Scots, Alexander III granted Lewis, Harris, Waternish, and Minginish to Harald. Leod later succeeded his father to the lands as his father's only son. Cromartie's account also states how Leod's wife was Adama, daughter of Fearchar, Earl of Ross. However, according to Sellar, there is no record of a son of Harald named Leod, nor is there any record of a daughter of Fearchar named Adama. Sellar also noted that there is no record of the grant of lands by Alexander III. Sellar went so far as to state that Leod's wife, father, and the grant, were nothing but figments of Cromartie's imagination. The manuscript history of the Rosses of Balnagown also notes Leod. This account, according to the 19th-century historian W.F. Skene, is older than that of Cromartie's. The manuscript states that a King of Denmark had three sons who came to the north of Scotland—Gwine, Loid, and Leandres. Gwine conquered the braes of Caithness; Loid conquered Lewis, and was the progenitor of the MacLeods; and Leandres conquered "Braychat be the sworde". Skene stated that Gwine likely was meant to refer to the eponymous ancestor of the Clan Gunn, and that Leandres refers to the Gilleandres whom "Clan Andres, or old Rosses" took their name.

=== Clan MacLeod ===
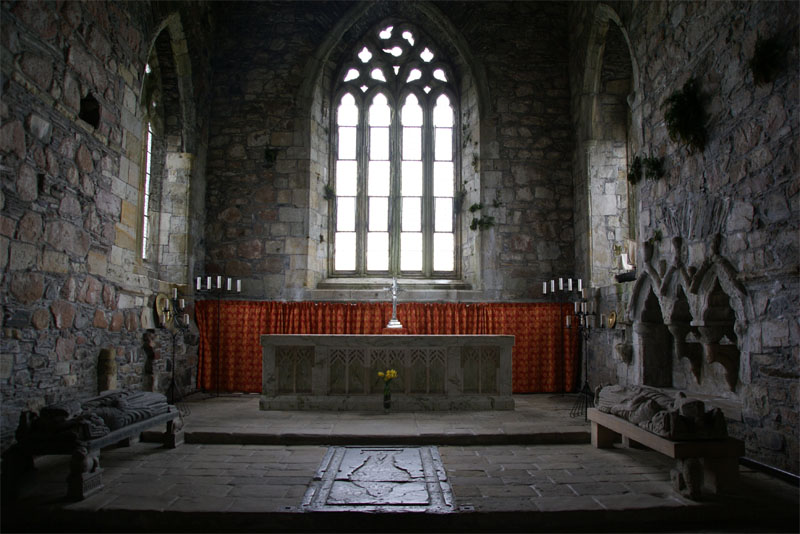
A photo of the choir of Iona Abbey. The stone said to represent a MacLeod is visible on the floor in the middle. The illustration on the right is a 19th-century depiction of the stone.

According to an account of MacLeod tradition written in 1797 for the clan's chief, Olaf the Black had three sons by his third wife, Christina, daughter of the Earl of Ross—Gunn, from whom descended Clan Gunn; Leandres, from whom descended Clan Leandres in Ross; and Leod. The tradition goes on to say that Leod was fostered by "Pol, son of Bok", sheriff of Skye. This Pol then gave Leod Harris; later Leod married a daughter of "McCraild Armuinn" and, in consequence, received Dunvegan and all the Skye estates which the MacLeods held in later times. In the Bannatyne manuscript, the sheriff is called "Paal Baccas", and is stated to have owned the isle of Harris, as well as the following lands on Skye: Sleat, Trotternish, Waternish, and Snizort. The manuscript states that he had a natural son, but named Leod his heir. The "Pol, son of Bok" and "Paal Baccas" of MacLeod tradition are considered to be identical with the historical Páll, son of Bálki, who is mentioned within the Chronicles of Mann as a loyal ally of Olaf the Black. The Bannatyne manuscript states that Paal Baccas was killed in 1231; after which Leod peacefully succeeded to his possessions.

The Bannatyne manuscript is the main authority for information on the early chiefs of Clan MacLeod. It states that the first seven chiefs of Clan MacLeod were buried at Iona. The choir of Iona Abbey, for the most part, dates from the early 16th century. Within the centre of the choir there is a large stone which once contained a monumental brass, traditionally said to have been a MacLeod. The stone formed a matrix which at one time contained the brass inlay (tradition states it was a silver inlay). It is the largest carved stone on the island, measuring 7 feet 9.25 inches (2.37 m) by 3 feet 10 inches (1.17 m). The early 20th-century clan historian R.C. MacLeod speculated that perhaps Leod and five of his successors were buried beneath—however, in his opinion the fourth chief, Iain Ciar, was buried elsewhere. (Note: Also buried within the tomb, according to tradition, was the standard bearer of the seventh chief (see Fairy Flag). MacLeod noted that there was another MacLeod stone on Iona; in his opinion this stone marked the grave of the fourth chief, Iain Ciar.) In fact, the stone may actually mark the tomb of a MacLean, rather than that of a MacLeod. (Note: The stone is mentioned in the late 17th century by William Sacheverell (c. 1675–1715), who visited Iona in August 1698: "In the middle on a flat stone, the proportion of a Man in Armour engrav'd, which seems very Ancient, and they say was laid there in Honour of one of the Family of Mac-Leon, who were for many Ages Lords of Mull".)

=== Issue ===
According to MacLeod tradition, Leod had two sons—Tormod and Torquil. The tradition is that Tormod was the ancestor of the MacLeods of Harris and Dunvegan (the chiefs of Clan MacLeod), and Torquil was the ancestor of the MacLeods of Lewis. The Bannatyne manuscript does not specifically state which son was the elder, and subsequently there has been debate over which branch was more 'senior' in descent. In the late 20th century, Matheson called into question this tradition of brothers, and his work was followed up by other historians. The current view of historians is that the two were not brothers at all; but that Torquil was actually the grandson of Tormod.

The Bannatyne manuscript also names two other sons; however, Matheson considered the manuscript to be of dubious authority, since it is the only source for these names. It lists Leod's third son as John, stating that John followed Bruce to Ireland. The manuscript continues that in Ireland he acquired considerable estates in Galway and was knighted; although he was the principal man of his name there, his descendants were known not as MacLeods, but as MacElliots. The manuscript states that his daughter, and heiress, married Maurice, 2nd Lord of Kerry. According to MacLeod, the statement about John following Bruce to Ireland is a mistake, since John's daughter couldn't have married later than 1285. Bruce was, however, born in 1275, and did not go to Ireland until 1306. Leod's fourth son is listed by the manuscript as being Olaus. The account states that this Olaus was the reputed ancestor of the MacLewis, or Fullarton family, which originated on the Isle of Arran and that this family traced its ancestry from Lewis, or MacLoy, son of Olaus, son of Leod.

The manuscript also states that Leod also had two daughters. Again, the manuscript is the only source for the existence of these offspring and does not mention their names. It states that one of the daughters married Fergus of Galloway; while the other married John, Lord of Mull. It is unknown who these men could have been.

== DNA and the founder of Clan MacLeod ==
In 2011, DNA tests were performed on a sample of 45 men with the surname MacLeod; 47% were found to share a common ancestor in the male line (the remaining 53% of the sample contained 9 different genetic male line lineages). The genetic marker of the 47%-lineage was found to be the S68 branch of Haplogroup R1b. This marker is found not only in the Western Isles, but also in Orkney, Shetland, England, Norway, and Sweden. In consequence, the study concluded that the genetic origin of Clan MacLeod likely lies in Scandinavia.

== See also ==
- Coat of arms of the Isle of Man, description of the current and past coats of arms of Lords/Kings of Mann
- Ljótólfr, a saga character associated with Lewis and once said to have been the eponymous ancestor of the MacLeods
- Léot of Brechin
- MacLeòid
