= Torquil MacLeod =

Scottish clan chief (fl. 14th century)

Torquil MacLeod (Scottish Gaelic: Torcall mac Murchaidh, and Torcall MacLeòid) (fl. 14th century) was a Hebridean lord and is today considered to be the founder of the MacLeods of Lewis, who are known in Gaelic as Sìol Torcaill ("seed of Torcall"). He was the son of Murdoch MacLeod, and a great-grandson of Leod, eponymous ancestor of the MacLeods.

== Background ==
According to MacLeod tradition, Torquil was a son of Leod, founder of Clan MacLeod. Clan traditions made Torquil the brother of Tormod, and stated that the two brothers founded the main branches of the clan— one branch being Sìol Tormoid ("seed of Tormod"), the MacLeods of Harris and Dunvegan; the other branch being Sìol Torcaill ("seed of Torcall"), the MacLeods of Lewis. This traditional story is no longer taken seriously by historians, and Torquil is now considered to have been the son of Murdoch, who was a grandson of Leod.

The late 20th-century historian William Matheson stated that the name Torquil was not a common one. (Note: Torquil is the Anglicised form of the Scottish Gaelic Torcall, which in turn derived from the Old Norse Þorketill. The name is still widely used today mainly in Norway as Torkell and Torkild.) Matheson noted that it occurs in the old genealogies of the MacNicols. Traditions linked the MacNicols with Lewis, as well as Assynt across the Minch; before being supplanted by the MacLeods who married a MacNicol heiress. Matheson stated that the name was not used by the MacLeods of Harris and Dunvegan; that the first MacLeod to bear the name was Torquil, son of Murdoch. In consequence, Matheson proposed that it must have been Torquil's father who married a MacNicol heiress and then gave their son the MacNicol name of Torquil. Matheson noted that a 19th-century Lewis senachie recalled a tradition that "the year after Torquil became chief of the Lews, he and the MacNaughtons [MacNicols] were proceeding in their birlins, or large boats, to Stornoway, when MacLeod ran the boat of MacNaughton [MacNicol] down in the Sound of Jaunt [Sound of Shiant], and allowed the whole crew to drown". Matheson speculated that Murdoch married a MacNicol heiress, and that their son, Torquil, became heir to the MacNicol lands after their MacNicol rivals were eliminated in a conflict at sea.

== Life ==
Torquil and his uncle, Malcolm, are the first MacLeods chiefs to appear in contemporary records. Their names are recorded as "Torkyll M'Cloyd", and "Malcolme, son to Tormode M'Cloyde", in a royal charter of 1343, during the reign of David II (r. 1329–1371), which grants Torquil the lands of Assynt. The eminent 19th-century Scottish scholar W.F. Skene noted that Torquil was not designated "of Lewis" in the charter, nor any other designation. Another 19th-century historian, Donald Gregory, stated that during this era, Torquil would have held Lewis, not from the kings of Scots, but from the lords of the Isles.

According to the 19th century Lewis senachie already mentioned, Torquil was a councillor between the Macaulays and Morrisons—two bitter rival clans—after a battle fought by them near Barvas.

== Family ==
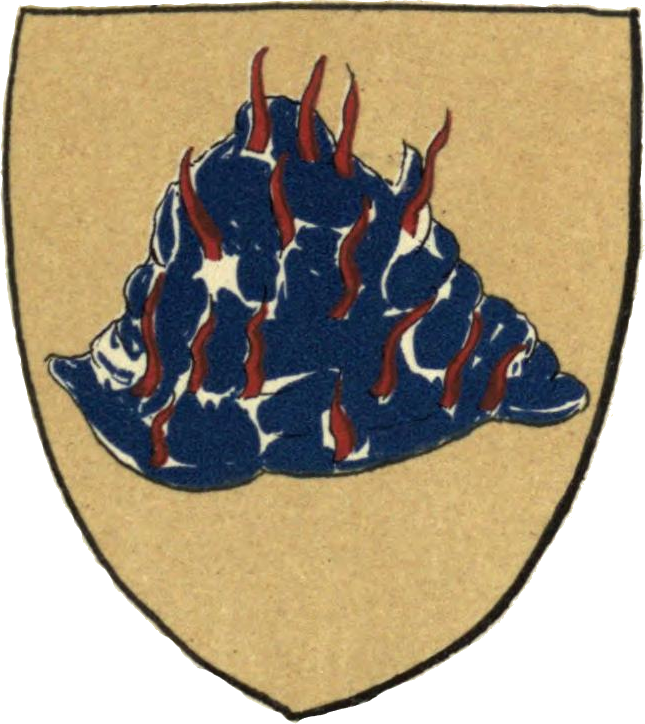
Mid 15th century arms of Torquil's descendants, the MacLeods of Lewis. The arms are thought to be derived from those of the MacNicols.

Torquil is said to have married Margaret, a MacNicol heiress of Assynt. Torquil was succeeded by his son, Roderick.

== Heraldry ==
According to W.D.H. Sellar, the coat of arms of the MacLeods of Lewis, which contains a black burning mountain on a gold field, probably passed into the possession of the MacLeods through the marriage of a MacNicol heiress. Sellar considered the possibility that the arms may represent the MacNicols' subordinate duty as coast watchers for the early Norse kings in the Isles. The early MacLeod of Lewis arms pictured right was recorded in the mid 15th century and is blazoned Or, a rock azure in flames gules.
