= Clan MacLeod of Lewis =

Highland Scottish clan

Clan MacLeod of the Lewes
- Sìol Thorcaill
- Crest: A golden sun in splendour
- Motto: I birn quhil I se / Luceo Non Uro

Profile
- District: Lewis

Chief
- Torquil Donald MacLeod of the Lewes
- Historic seat: Stornoway Castle, Stornoway, Isle of Lewis.
Clan branches
Macleods of Lewis (historic chiefs)
Macleods of Assynt
MacLeod of Raasay
Macleods of Pabbay and Uig
Macleods of Cadboll
Allied clans
Clan MacLeod
Rival clans
Clan Mackenzie
Clan Morrison
Clan MacNeacail
Kindreds
Macaulay family of Lewis

Clan MacLeod of The Lewes, commonly known as Clan MacLeod of Lewis (Scottish Gaelic: Clann Mhic Leòid Leòdhais), is a Highland Scottish clan, which at its height held extensive lands in the Western Isles and west coast of Scotland. From the 14th century up until the beginning of the 17th century there were two branches of Macleods: the MacLeods of Dunvegan and Harris (Clan MacLeod); and the Macleods of the Isle of Lewis. In Gaelic the Macleods of Lewis were known as Sìol Thorcaill ("Seed of Torquil"), and the MacLeods of Dunvegan and Harris were known as Sìol Thormoid ("Seed of Tormod").

The traditional progenitor of the MacLeods was Leod, made a son of Olaf the Black, King of Mann and the Isles, by a now-discredited tradition. An older, more accepted tradition names his father Olvir and describes the clan as Sliochd Olbhur. Tradition gave Leod two sons, Tormod - progenitor of the Macleods of Harris and Dunvegan (Sìol Thormoid); and Torquil - progenitor of the Macleods of Lewis (Sìol Thorcaill). In the 16th and early 17th centuries the chiefly line of the Clan Macleod of The Lewes was nearly extinguished by the bloodthirsty and power hungry chief "Old Rory" and his various offspring. This feuding directly led to the fall of the clan, and loss of its lands to the Clan Mackenzie. One line of the 16th century chiefly family, the Macleods of Raasay, survived and prospered on their lands for centuries thereafter. The current chief of Lewis descends from this latter family.

Today, Clan MacLeod of The Lewes, MacLeod of Raasay, and Clan MacLeod are represented by "Associated Clan MacLeod Societies", and the chiefs of the three clans. The association is made up of twelve national societies around the world including: Australia, Canada, England, France, Germany, Italy, New Zealand, Scotland, South Africa (inactive), Sweden, Switzerland, and the United States of America.

== Traditional origins ==
=== Olaf the Black ===
Flag of the Isle of Man. The modern coat of arms of the chiefs of Clan Macleod (Macleod of Macleod) use the three legs of Mann. "The Macleods imagined themselves descended from King Olaf of Man".

Today the official clan tradition is that the Macleods descend from Leod, born around 1200. Traditionally, from Leod's son Tormod the Macleods of Harris and Dunvegan claim descent, and through Leod's other son Torquil Macleods of Lewis claim descent. The earliest evidence of this traditional descent from Olaf the Black may only date as far back as the 17th century, from the era of Iain Mor MacLeod (chief of Clan Macleod 1626–1649) who was styled "John McOlaus of Dunvegane" in a document dated 1630. Also, his son Iain Breac (chief of Clan Macleod 1664–1693) is thought to have been the first Macleod to incorporate the coat of arms of the Kings of Mann into his own coat of arms, because the "Macleods imagined themselves descended from King Olaf of Man".

Leod, the traditional eponymous ancestor of the clan, does not appear in contemporary records, or even the Chronicles of Mann which lists the four sons of Olaf. After the last king of this dynasty, Magnus Olafsson, died in 1265, and after the last known male representative of the family fled from the Isle of Man to Wales in 1275, the claims of the Isle of Man was taken up on behalf of the daughters of the family. This, according to Andrew P. MacLeod, implies that the legitimate male line from Olaf the Black was by then extinct. "In short, there is no historical reason to believe that Leod was the son of Olaf the Black".

=== Clan lands and the Nicolsons/MacNicols ===
Recently several historians have shown a connection between the early clan and the Hebridean Nicolsons/MacNicols. W.D.H. Sellar and William Matheson pointed out that in lands held by the clan (Lewis, in Wester Ross, and Waternish on the Isle of Skye), there were traditions of the Nicolsons/MacNicols preceding them. Of Lewis itself, tradition had it that the Macleods gained the island through a marriage with a Nicolson heiress. Both Sellar and Matheson agreed that the traditional connection and the gaining of lands through the Nicolsons explains the Macleods of Lewis' identity "as a clan separate from the MacLeods of Harris and Dunvegan". Also, even though the heraldry of the Macleod of The Lewes is very different from that of the Macleod of Macleod, there may be a connection with the Hebridean Nicolsons/MacNicols. In their coat of arms, the Macleods of The Lewes have "a black burning mountain on a gold field". According to Sellar, when the Macleods married the Nicolson heiress of tradition, her arms would have likely passed to the Macleods as well. The Hebridean Nicolsons/MacNicols were supposed to have held their lands in the Western Isles from the Norse rulers for their services as coast-watchers, hence the burning mountain on the arms of Macleod of The Lewes.

== History ==
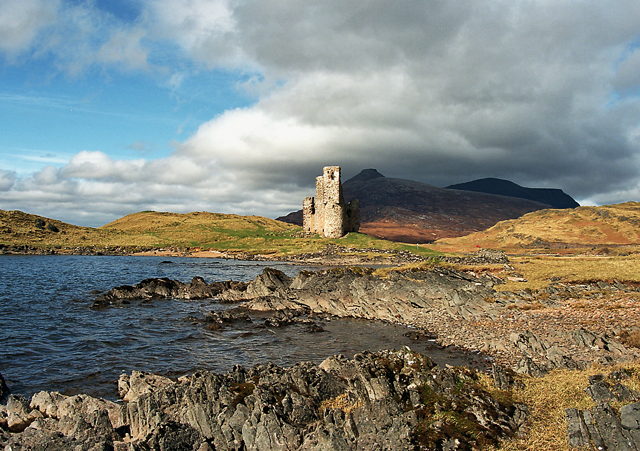
The ruined Ardvreck Castle, on Loch Assynt in Sutherland. The castle, built by the Macleods, dates from the 16th century.

=== 14th and 15th centuries ===
The earliest reference to the Macleods of Lewis is found in a royal charter granted in the reign of David II King of Scots (reigned 1329–1371), when Torcall Macleod was granted the four penny land of Assynt, possibly in c.1343. In this charter Torcall had no designation, showing that he held no property until then. By 1344 the Macleods of Lewis held the Isle of Lewis as vassals of the Macdonalds of Islay. In time the Macleods of Lewis grew in power, rivalling the Macleods of Harris - with lands stretching from the islands of Lewis, Raasay, the district of Waternish on Skye, and on the mainland Assynt, Coigach and Gairloch.

In 1406 a party of Macleods of Lewis were defeated at the battle of Tuiteam Tarbhach against a party of Mackays. The cause of the battle, according of tradition, was the ill treatment of Sidheag, widow of Angus Mackay of Strathnaver, by her brother-in-law Hucheon, Tutor of Mackay. Sidheag was also the sister of The Macleod of The Lewes, and consequently a contingent of Macleods of Lewis led by the chiefs brother, Gille-caluim Beag, encountered a party of Mackays in Sutherland. During the battle that followed the Macleods were routed and Gille-caluim Beag was slain.

=== 16th century ===
In 1528 the chief of the clan, John Macleod of The Lewes, supported his half-brother, Donald Gruamach MacDonald of Sleat, who had seized the lands of Trotternish from the Macleods of Harris and Dunvegan.

Domhnall Dubh was proclaimed Lord of the Isles by many families who had once served under Clan Donald: the Macleods of Lewis, the Camerons of Locheil, the MacLeans of Duart, the MacLeans of Lochbuie and the MacQuarries of Ulva, the MacNeills of Barra and the MacDonalds of Largie. The only families which remained loyal to the Crown were the Macleods of Harris and Dunvegan, and the MacIains of Ardnamurchan. Upon the collapse of the rebellion, and Domhnall Dubh's death in 1545, Ruairi was pardoned for his treasonable part in the rebellion. Though it is clear he and his clan continued to act independently of the Scottish Government. In 1554 Letters of Fire and Sword were issued for the extermination of Ruairi Macleod of The Lewes, John Moydertach of Clan Ranald and Donald Gormson MacDonald of Sleat after they all refused to attend Parliament at Inverness.

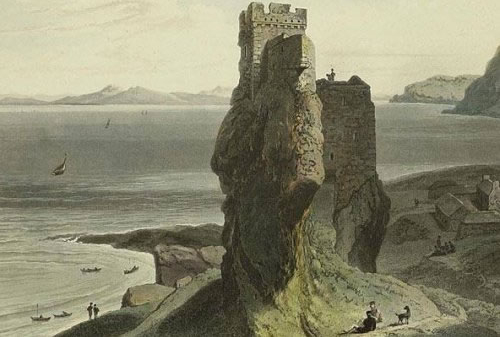
Castle Brochel on the Isle of Rassay, by William Daniell in 1819. Brochel Castle was built in the late 15th century or early 16th century, traditionally by MacGilleChaluim, first Macleod chief of Raasay.

=== Fall of the clan ===
The fall of the clan and loss of the Isle of Lewis, began with Ruairi and his marriage to a daughter of John Mackenzie of Kintail. This marriage had produced a son named Torquil Connanach (named after his residence among the Mackenzies in Strathconnan). Ruairi later disowned Torquil Connanach on account of the alleged adultery between his wife and the Morrison brieve of Lewis. Ruairi's wife later abandoned him and eloped with a cousin of his, John MacGillechallum of Raasay, after which Ruairi divorced her. In 1541 Ruairi married Barbara Stewart, daughter of Andrew Lord Avondale, and by her had a son named Torquil Oighre ("Heir" to distinguish him from the disowned Torquil).

In about 1566 the legitimate son Torquil Oighre drowned along with sixty of his supporters while sailing from Lewis to Skye across the Minch. Immediately the disinherited Torquil Connanach took up arms, supported by the Mackenzies. He captured his supposed father Ruairi, and for the next four years kept him as prisoner under dreadful conditions within the castle of Stornoway.

Ruairi was only released from captivity by agreeing to recognise Torquil Connanach as his lawful heir. In 1572 Ruairi was then brought before the Privy Council where he was forced to resign to the Crown his lands of Lewis, Assynt, Coigach and Waternish. These lands were then granted to Torquil Connanach as his lawful heir, and he only received them back in life-rent. When Ruairi had returned to Lewis he revoked all he had agreed to on the grounds of coercion on 2 June 1572. Later in 1576, Regent Morton was successful in reconciling Ruairi and Torquil Connanach, where Tocall was again made lawful heir and also received charter to the lands of Coigach.

Some time later Ruairi took for his third wife a daughter of Hector Og Maclean of Duart, and had by her two sons, Torquil Dubh and Tormod. Ruairi also had several natural sons, Tormod Uigach and Murdoch. Ruairi then made Torquil Dubh his heir, and again Torquil Connanach took up arms supported by the Mackenzies. Ruairi was aided by several of his illegitimate sons, including Donald, Ruairi Og and Niall, though two others, Tormod Uigach (from Uig, Lewis) and Murdoch aided Torquil Connanach. In the encounter that followed Ruairi was again captured, and many of his men were killed. Upon Torquil Connanach's victory all charters and title deeds of Lewis were handed over to the Mackenzies. Ruairi was held captive in the castle of Stornoway, commanded by Torquil Connanach's son John, though was freed when Ruairi Og attacked the castle and killed John. Upon his release Ruairi ruled Lewis in peace for the rest of his life.

Upon the death of Ruairi Macleod of The Lewes, the chieftainship of the clan passed to Torquil Dubh. In 1596 Torquil Dubh, with a force of seven or eight hundred men, devastated Torquil Connanach's lands of Coigach and the Mackenzie lands of Loch Broom. In consequence, Torquil Dubh was summoned to appear before the Privy Council and was declared a rebel when he failed to appear. Torquil Dubh was finally betrayed by the Brieve of Lewis, chief of the Morrisons of Ness. Once captured, the brieve sent Torquil Dubh to Coigach where he and his companions were beheaded by Torquil Connanach, on the orders of Kenneth Mackenzie of Kintail in July 1597. Following this, Lewis was commanded by Torquil Dubh's three young sons and his illegitimate brother Niall. The Macleods of Lewis were also aided by the Macleods of Harris and the Macleans.

=== Loss of Lewis ===
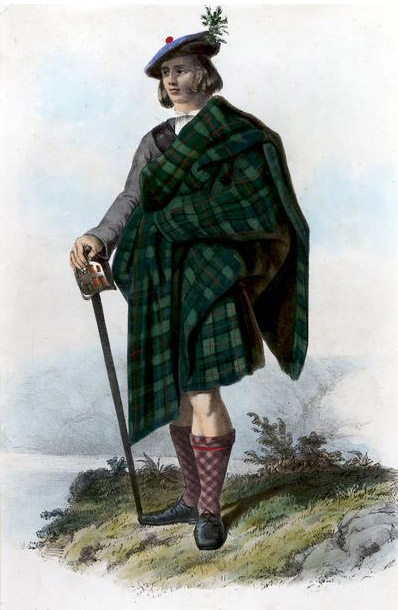
A Victorian era, romanticised depiction of a member of Clan Macleod by R. R. McIan, from The Clans of the Scottish Highlands, published in 1845. The tartan depicted is based upon the Mackenzie tartan, the Mackenzies conquered Lewis from the Macleods of Lewis.

Though Torquil Dubh had several sons, Donald Gorm Mor of Sleat considered himself an heir of the deceased chief of Lewis and invaded the island pursuing his claim. It was not until after causing much destruction that the MacDonald of Sleat chief was driven off the island by the Lewismen. Because the Mackenzies now had the title deeds of Lewis, the island was forfeited by the Act of Estates in 1597, which gave the Scottish Government an excuse to attempt the colonisation the island.

During this era on Lewis the Macleods took part in the succession of feuds of their neighbouring clans such as the Morrisons and their enemies the MacAulays of Lewis.

==== End of Old Ruairi’s line ====
After the conquest of Lewis by the Mackenzies, Niall Macleod and his nephews Malcolm, William and Ruairi (the sons of Ruairi Og), and about thirty others took refuge on Bearasay in the mouth of Loch Roag on the west coast of Lewis. For almost three years the small group of Macleods held out against the Mackenzies before being driven off. Niall then surrendered himself to Ruairi Mor Macleod of Harris and Dunvegan. Later when travelling in the south Ruairi was forced to deliver both Niall and Niall's son Donald to the Privy Council in Edinburgh. Ruairi Mor later served some time in prison for harbouring the rebels, though he was also later knighted for his service to the Crown. Niall was brought to trial, convicted and executed in April 1613, dying "very Christianlie". Niall's son Donald was banished from Scotland, and ended up dying in Holland without any known issue.

Two of Ruairi Og's sons - Ruairi and William - were captured and hanged by Mackenzie of Kintail. The one remaining son, Malcolm, was captured at the same time, though escaped and harassed the Mackenzies for years afterwards. Malcolm played a prominent part in Sir James Macdonald's rebellion in 1615, and later went to Flanders, in 1616 he was again on Lewis where he killed "two gentlemen of the Mackenzies". Later he went to Spain, returnining in 1620 with Sir James Macdonald. Commissions of Fire and Sword were granted to Lord Kintail and the Mackenzies against "Malcolm MacRuari Macleod" in 1622 and 1626. Nothing more is known of him. Tormod, the last legitimate son of Old Ruairi, was released from prison in Edinburgh in 1615, and left for Holland where he died with no known issue. Nothing is known of the fate of Torquil Dubh's sons Ruairi and Torquil.

After the Macleods lost control of Lewis, the title Lord Macleod was the second title of the Mackenzie, Earls of Cromartie. They claimed this right through their descent from Margaret, daughter of Torquil Conanach, who succeeded to her father's claim to Lewis. In time, the chiefship of the Macleods of Lewis passed to the Macleods of Raasay, near cousins of Old Ruairi. This line of Chiefs continues unbroken to this day.

== 20th and 21st centuries ==
Torquil Roderick Macleod, 17th of Raasay, was a grandson of Loudoun Hector Macleod, and a farmer who lived in Tasmania. He had an interest in the history of the clan and matriculated arms at the Court of the Lord Lyon as Macleod of Raasay. Later in 1988 he was officially recognised as "Torquil Roderick Macleod of The Lewes and Chief and Head of the baronial House of Macleod of the Lewes" by Lord Lyon King of Arms. In 2001 the chief of the clan died and was succeeded by his eldest son Torquil Donald Macleod of The Lewes. The present chief of Clan Macleod of The Lewes lives in Sandy Bay, Tasmania, Australia.

Today both the Clan Macleod of The Lewes and Clan Macleod are represented by "Associated Clan MacLeod Societies" (ACMS), with the chiefs Hugh Magnus Macleod of Macleod, Chief of Clan Macleod, and Torquil Donald Macleod of The Lewes, Chief of Clan Macleod of The Lewes. The association is made up of twelve national societies across the world including: Australia, Canada, England, France, Germany, Italy, New Zealand, Scotland, Sweden, South Africa (inactive), Switzerland and the United States of America. The ACMS last held Parliament in 2026 on the Isle of Skye.

=== MacLeod DNA ===
A recent study of DNA from MacLeods determined that, out of 45 men with the surname, almost half of these men (47%) were descended from the same man. The genetic marker of this group is rare in the British Isles, and has been found not only in "MacLeod territory", but also in Orkney, Shetland, and Norway. The study considered it to be evidence of a Norse origin of the clan's founder.

== Clan profile ==
=== Origin of the name ===
The clan surnames MacLeod and McLeod (and other variants) are Anglicisations of the Gaelic patronymic name Mac Leòid meaning "son of Leòd". This Gaelic name (Leòd) is a form of the Old Norse personal name Ljótr which can mean “bright”, “shining” or alternatively "ugly".

=== Clan chiefs ===
#	Name	Dates	Ancestral Notes
1	Torquil Og	bef.1320.	
2	Roderick (Ruaidhri) Mor	c.1362. /* Clan chiefs */	
3	Torquil	c.1394–aft.1498.	
4	Roderick (Ruaidhri)	c.1426–aft.1496.	
5	Torquil	c.1450–bef.1511.	
6	Roderick ("Old Ruari")	c.1500–c.1595.	
Chiefly line is lost. A new line is recognised in modern times.
	Torquil Roderick	1919–2001.	Matriculated arms as MacLeod of Raasay. Recognised by the Lord Lyon, in 1988, as Roderick MacLeod of the Lewes and Chief and Head of the baronial House of MacLeod of The Lewes.
	Torquil Donald	b.1948.	Current chief. Eldest son of Torquil Roderick.

=== Branches of the clan ===
- The Macleods of Raasay.

The Macleods of Raasay are descended from Gillicallum (Malcolm) Macleod, second son of the Laird of Lewis. Alive in the mid to late 15th century, he wed Marion, daughter of John Gorm Campbell of Craignish (Died 1498). In 1597 John Macgillichallum brother to the Laird of Raasay was killed at the Battle of Logiebride. The present chief of the Macleods of Raasay is Roderick John Macleod, 18th of Raasay, who lives in Tasmania, Australia. He is the brother of the present Macleod of The Lewes.

- The Macleods of Assynt.

In the early 15th century the lands of Assynt were given in vassalage by Roderick Macleod of The Lewes to his younger son, Tormod. This Tormod became ancestor of the Macleods of Assynt. In the 16th century the MacLeods of Assynt supported the Mackays of Aberach, a branch of the Clan Mackay, in a feud against their chief Huistean Du Mackay, 13th of Strathnaver. During this feud the MacLeods of Assynt fought against the Clan Gunn at the Battle of Leckmelm in 1586. However, the MacLeods of Assynt later sided with Huistean Du Mackay of Strathnaver in a feud against the Earl of Caithness. During the civil war of the 17th century, following the Battle of Carbisdale on 27 April 1650, where the Royalists led by James Graham, 1st Marquess of Montrose were defeated by the Covenanters, upon fleeing for his life the Marquess of Montrose was given shelter by the wife of Neil Macleod of Assynt at Ardvreck Castle and then betrayed him to the Marquess of Argyll. Neil was the last Macleod chieftain to hold lands in Ayssnt. In 1672 he was denounced as a rebel and commission of fire and sword was obtained against him and his lands were conquered by the Seaforth Mackenzies. During the Jacobite rising of 1745 while the MacLeods of Lewis supported the Jacobite cause, Hugh MacLeod of Geanies commanded an Independent Highland Company of the MacLeods of Assynt in support of the British Government.

- The Macleods of Pabbay and Uig.

The branch called the Macleods of Pabbay and Uig descend from Norman (Old Norman) Macleod, Ist of Pabbay and Uig, who was born probably ca. 1480 and a son of Torquil Macleod, born ca. 1380, VI Chief of the Macleods of Lewis and his wife Catherine Campbell. Old Norman held lands at Hacklete, Earshader, Pabbay and Baille na Cille. Members of this branch spell their name with a small l. Many Ministers of the Church and many doctors of medicine have been produced by this branch and even a Chancellor of the Exchequer.

== Castles ==
Castles that have belonged to the Clan MacLeod of Lewis have included:

- Stornoway Castle, Stornoway, Isle of Lewis, also known as MacLeod's Castle, was held by the MacLeods of Lewis but an earlier stronghold on the site that may date from the 11th century was held by the Clan MacNicol. The MacLeods either forced the MacNicols from Lewis or married a MacNicol heiress by force, or both. The castle was captured by the Clan Gordon Earl of Huntly in 1506 but managed to hold out against the Clan Campbell Earl of Argyll in 1554. It was demolished by Oliver Cromwell's forces in 1653. Cromwell's forces were themselves allegedly massacred by the islanders.
- Brochel Castle, a small and ruinous stronghold, seven miles of north of Clachan on Raasay, was held by the MacLeod of Raasay branch of the clan.
- Assynt Castle, also known as Eilean Assynt, four miles north-west of Inchnadamph on the mainland, was built on an island on Loch Assynt but little remains. It was held by the MacLeod of Assynt branch of the clan and was besieged by the Clan Mackay of Strathnaver in 1585 and by the Clan Mackenzie in 1646. The castle may have been used as a prison after the clan moved to Ardvreck Castle.
- Ardvreck Castle a later seat of the MacLeod of Assynt branch of the clan. It was sacked by the Mackenzies in 1672.
- Geanies Castle, near Tain, Ross, was held by the MacLeod of Geanies branch of the clan but passed to the Clan Sinclair in 1624.
- See also: Castles of the Clan MacLeod.

== Septs of the clan ==
Clan septs refer to clans or families who were under the protection of a more powerful clan or family. Scottish clans were largely collections of different families, whether actually related or not, who held allegiance to a common chief. A modern example of this can be seen in the parish of Dunvegan in 1746, where of 500 men named only 110 are actually MacLeods. All of those named were tenants of the MacLeod chief and would have acted as part of the clan. The following names have been attributed as septs of Clan Macleod of The Lewes.

Names	Notes
Allum, Callam, Callum, Challum, Gillecallum, MacAllum, MacAlman MacCallum, MacCalman, MacGillechallum, Malcolm. Malcolmson.	Also attributed as a sept of Clan MacCallum and Clan Malcolm. According to George Fraser Black, Mac-ille-Challum is the patronymic of the MacLeods of Raasay.
Lewis.	Also attributed as a sept of Clan Stewart.
MacAskill, Kasky, MacAsgill, MacCaskie, Caskie, MacCaskill, MacKaskill, McCaskill, MaKasky, Taskill.	The name MacAskill means son of Askell, with Askell being a Norse personal name. The MacAskills were established on the Isle of Skye and held Dunscaith Castle in the fourteenth century. William MacAskill, probably of Eabost, led the MacLeods in battle against the MacDonalds in the sixteenth century. During the Jacobite rising of 1745 the Clan MacLeod supported the British-Hanoverian Government and John MacAskill was an ensign in one of the Independent Highland Companies raised by the MacLeod chief to support the government. Calgary Castle on the Isle of Mull was built for the MacAskills in about 1823 and is from where Calgary in Canada gets its name.
MacAulay, Aulay, Calley, Caulay, Coll, MacAllay, MacAlley, MacAuley, MacCaulay, MacCauley, MacCorley.	See Macaulays of Lewis. According to James Ayars, Genealogy coordinator of the Associated Clan MacLeod Society, "MacAuley is both a sept of Clan MacLeod and Clan Donald, and a clan in its own right", see Clan MacAulay.
MacCabe, MacKabe.	According to Black, McCabe as a branch of the MacLeods of Arran who immigrated to Ireland in the 14th century.
MacCorkill, MacCorkindale, MacCorkle, MacCorquodale MacKerkyll, MacKorkyll, MacOrkill, McCorkie, McKurkull.	Also attributed as a sept of Clan Gunn. See also Clan McCorquodale.
MacCorkindale, Corquodale and MacCorcadail, MacCorkill, MacCorkle, MacCorquodale, MacThorcadail.	Black also lists Corquodale though there is no evidence of any relationship between MacCorkindale and its derivatives and MacLeod. See also, Clan McCorquodale.
Nicol, deNicole, MacNichol, MacNickle, McNychol, Necolson, Nichol(s), Nicholl, Nicholson, Nickle, Nicoll, Nicollsoun, Nicolson, Nuccol, Nuckall, Nucolsone.	Nicol is also associated with Clan Macfie. There is also a Clan Nicolson and Clan MacNeacail.
Norie, Noray, Nore, Norn, Norrey, Norreys, Norrie, Norris, Norye.	
Tolmie.	Black wrote that the Tolmies of the Hebrides are called Clann Talvaich.

== Clan symbolism ==
=== Crest badge ===
- Crest badge: Note: the crest badge is made up of the chief's heraldic crest and motto,
  - Chief's crest: A golden sun in splendour.
  - Chief's motto: Note: there are two versions of the chief's heraldic motto,
    - I birn quhil I se. Often, mistranslated as, "I shine, not burn". The literal translation should be; "I burn, while I watch".
    - Luceo non uro. (translation from Latin: "I burn but am not consumed", or "I shine, not burn").

Note: the mottoes allude to the coat of arms of Macleod of The Lewes which contains a burning beacon or fiery mountain, which may have originally been the arms of the MacNicol coast-watchers.

=== Tartan ===
Tartan image	Notes
	Nicknamed "Loud MacLeod", this tartan is generally referred to as "MacLeod Dress" or "MacLeod of Lewis" and sometimes "Macleod, Yellow of Raasay", it's one of the most instantly recognisable of Scottish tartans. The first image of the sett, thought to date from the 1830s, is a portrait of John Macleod, 13th of Raasay, indeed there is said to be a sample, dated 1822, with a note "invented by Macleod of Raasay". Sir Thomas Dick Lauder, in a letter to Sir Walter Scott in 1829 described it thus: "MacLeod(of Dunvegan) has got a sketch of this splendid tartan, three black stryps upon ain yellow fylde". It's thought the Macleod chief was a good friend of the Sobieski Stuarts, who gave him a sketch of the tartan years before they published it as "Clann-Lewid" in the Vestiarium Scoticum in 1842. The Vestiarium, a Victorian hoax composed and illustrated by the fraudulent 'Sobieski Stuarts', is the source for many of today's "clan tartans".
	This tartan is sometimes known as "MacLeod hunting" or "MacLeod of Harris". It was published in several early collections of tartan such as Logan's The Scottish Gael (1831) and Smibert's (1851). The tartan is derived from the Mackenzie tartan used by John Mackenzie in 1771, when he raised the regiment known as "Lord Macleod's Highlanders". The Mackenzies claimed to be heirs to the chiefship of the Macleods of Lewis, after the death of Roderick in 1595. The tartan was approved by Norman Magnus, 26th chief of the Dunvegan Macleods. It was adopted by the clan society in 1910.
	"MacLeod of Assynt". The Macleods of Assynt are a branch of Clan Macleod of The Lewes. The tartan is almost identical to the "MacLeod of Harris/Hunting" tartan (pictured above) and was first published as "MacLeod of Assynt" in 1906.
	The "MacLeod of Raasay" tartan is very similar to the Macleod tartan found in the Vestiarium (pictured top) and is thought to be based on that sett. It is therefore considered to date from sometime later than 1829. Alternatively its inclusion in the records of the Highland Society of London may indicate an earlier origin. In this alternative scenario the yellow "Vestiarium" tartan would trace its origin to the earlier Raasay sett.

== Bibliography ==
- Gregory, Donald (1881). History Of The Western Highlands And Isles Of Scotland, From A.D. 1493 To A.D. 1625 (2 ed.). London: Hamilton, Adams and Co. ISBN 0-7884-0420-2.
- Mackay, Angus (1906). Book of Mackay. 25 George IV Bridge, Edinburgh: Norman Macleod.
- Maclauchlan, Thomas; Wilson, John (1875). Keltie, John Scott (ed.). A History of the Scottish Highlands, Highland Clans and Highland Regiments. Vol. 2. Edinburgh: A. Fullarton & Co.
- Reaney, Percy Hilde; Wilson, Richard Middlewood (2006). A Dictionary of English Surnames (3rd ed.). London: Routledge. ISBN 0-203-99355-1.
- Roberts, John Leonard (1999). Feuds, Forays and Rebellions: History of the Highland Clans, 1475-1625. Edinburgh University Press. ISBN 0-7486-6244-8.
- Stewart, Donald Calder; Thompson, J. Charles (1980). Scarlett, James (ed.). Scotland's Forged Tartans. Edinburgh: Paul Harris Publishing. ISBN 0-904505-67-7.
- Thomas, F.W.L. (1876–1878). "Traditions of the Morrisons (Clan Mac Ghillemhuire), Hereditary Judges of Lewis" (PDF). Proceedings of the Society of Antiquaries of Scotland. 12: 503–556. doi:10.9750/PSAS.012.503.556. S2CID 253274657.
