= Bannatyne manuscript (Clan MacLeod) =

The Bannatyne manuscript is a traditional account of Clan MacLeod. It consists of 142 sheets of foolscap paper. The author's name does not appear in it. Although the work is undated, a watermark dates the paper upon which it is written to 1829. The textual material from which the manuscript is based is generally regarded to have been the work of William Macleod Bannatyne, Lord Bannatyne (died 1833).

Lord Bannatyne was the son of Roderick Macleod (died 1784), and Isabel (fl. 1736–1744), daughter of Hector Bannatyne of Kames. It was through his mother that William Macleod Bannatyne inherited the estate of Kames and assumed the name "Bannatyne". William Macleod Bannatyne is known to have compiled an earlier account of the clan in 1767.

Another candidate for the authorship of the Bannatyne manuscript is Bannatyne William Macleod, a cousin of William Macleod Bannatyne (died 1857). The manuscript, therefore, seems to date from 1829 to the year of Bannatyne William Macleod's death in 1857.
