= Fairy Flag =

Heirloom of the chiefs of Clan MacLeod

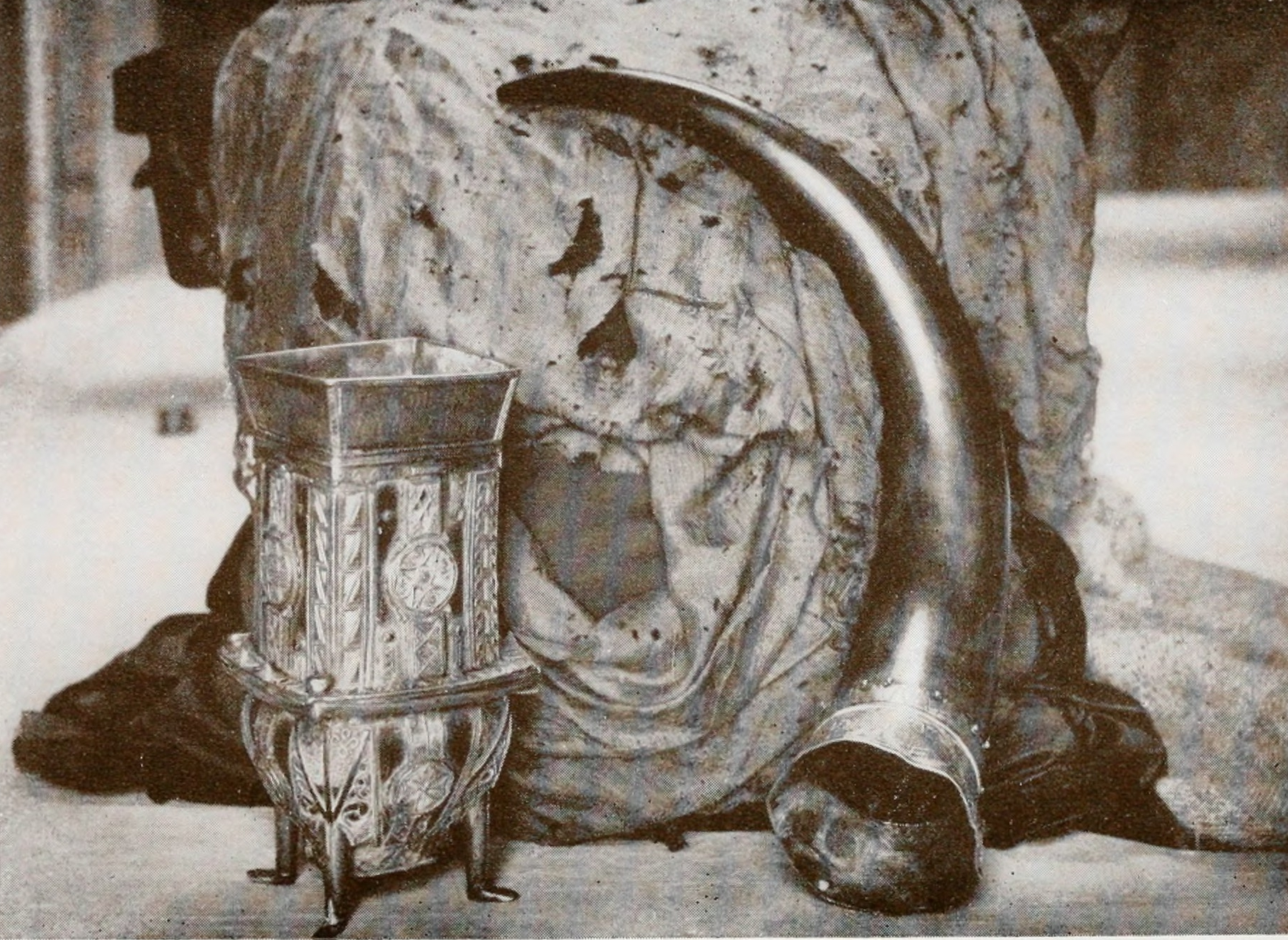
The Dunvegan Cup, Fairy Flag, and Sir Rory Mor's Horn are heirlooms of the MacLeods of Dunvegan. This photo was taken sometime before 1927.

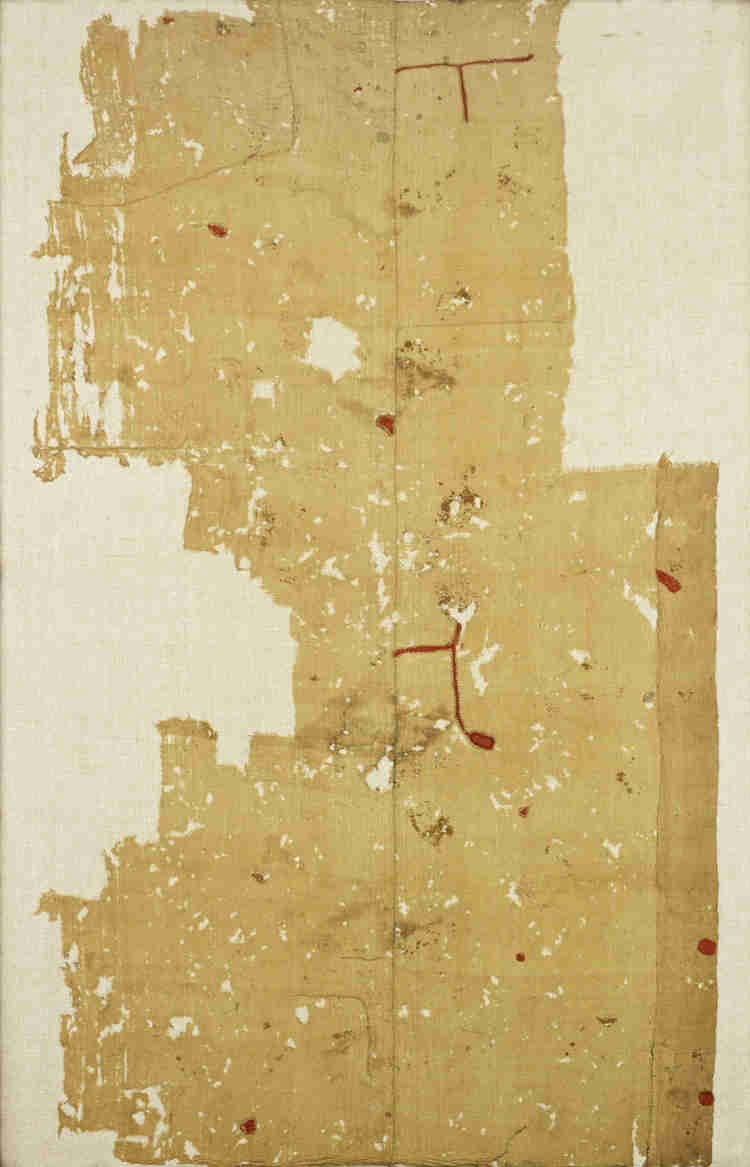
A modern photo of the Fairy Flag on display at Dunvegan Castle.

The Fairy Flag (Scottish Gaelic: A' Bhratach Shìth) is an heirloom of the chiefs of Clan MacLeod. It is held in Dunvegan Castle along with other notable heirlooms, such as the Dunvegan Cup and Sir Rory Mor's Horn. The flag is made of silk, is yellow or brown in colour, and is a square of side about 18 inches (45 centimetres). It has been examined numerous times in the last two centuries, and its condition has somewhat deteriorated. It is ripped and tattered, and is considered to be extremely fragile. The flag is covered in small red "elf dots". In the early part of the 19th century, the flag was also marked with small crosses, but these have since disappeared. The silk of the flag has been stated to have originated in the Far East, and was therefore extremely precious, which led some to believe that the flag may have been an important relic of some sort. Others have attempted to associate the flag with the Crusades or even a raven banner, which was said to have been used by various Viking leaders in the British Isles.

There are numerous traditions and stories associated with the flag, most of which deal with its magical properties and mysterious origins. The flag is variously said to have originated as a gift from the fairies to an infant chieftain, as a gift to a chief from a departing fairy-lover, and as a reward for defeating an evil spirit. The various powers attributed to the Fairy Flag include: the ability to multiply a clan's military forces; the ability to save the lives of certain clanfolk; the ability to cure a plague on cattle; the ability to increase the chances of fertility; and the ability to bring herring into the loch at Dunvegan. Some traditions relate that if the flag were to be unfurled and waved more than three times, it would either vanish, or lose its powers forever.

Clan tradition, preserved in the early 19th century, tells how the Fairy Flag was entrusted to a family of hereditary standard bearers. Only the eldest male of this family was ever allowed to unfurl the flag; the first such hereditary standard bearer was given the honour of being buried inside the tomb of the chiefs, on the sacred isle of Iona. Tradition states that the flag was unfurled at several clan battles in the 15th and 16th centuries; the flag's magical powers are said to have won at least one of them. Another 19th-century tradition linked the flag to a prophecy which foretold the downfall of Clan MacLeod; but it also prophesied that, in the "far distant future", the clan would regain its power and raise its honour higher than ever before. In the mid-20th century, the Fairy Flag was said to have extinguished a fire at Dunvegan Castle, and to have given luck to servicemen flying bombing missions in the Second World War.

== Description ==
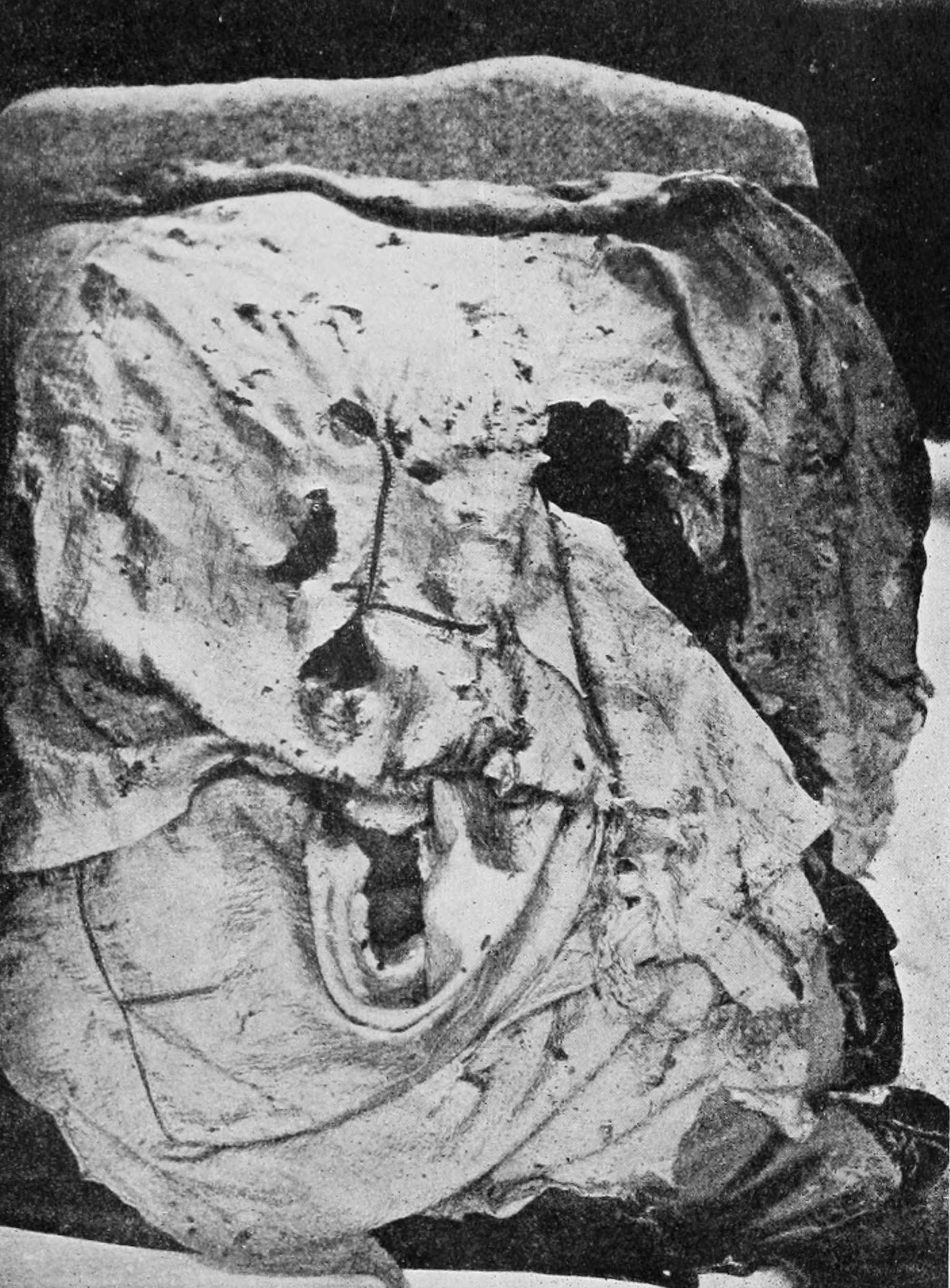
The ripped and tattered Fairy Flag, photographed sometime before 1924.

In the 19th century, the writer Rev. Norman Macleod (1783–1862) (Note: Norman Macleod was known in Gaelic as Caraid nan Gaidheal, "friend of the Gael".) recalled seeing the Fairy Flag during his childhood around 1799 (see relevant section below). He described the flag as then having crosses wrought in gold thread, and several "elf spots" stitched upon it. N. Macleod recollected that when the flag was examined, bits were taken off it from time to time; so much so, that later in his life he did not believe the flag still existed. In August 1814, Sir Walter Scott visited Dunvegan Castle on the Isle of Skye, and wrote of the visit in his diary. One of several items he mentioned seeing was the Fairy Flag. Scott described it as "a pennon of silk, with something like round red rowan-berries wrought upon it". John Francis Campbell saw the flag in 1871, and described it as being "made of yellow raw silk with figures and spots worked on it in red". In 1927, Roderick Charles MacLeod described the flag as then being square and brown. He measured it as about 18 in (45 cm) squared. He considered the flag to have originally been much larger; and remarked on its extreme fragility and the requirement for careful handling, if it should be handled at all. R. C. MacLeod noted N. Macleod's description of the flag, but observed that it now only contained the "elf spots"—there was then no evidence of any crosses upon what remained of the flag. R. C. MacLeod also observed that several tears in the flag had been carefully mended.

The flag was examined in the early 20th century by A. J. B. Wace of the Victoria and Albert Museum, who concluded that the silk was woven in either Syria or Rhodes, and the darns were made in the Near East. It was his opinion that the flag, in its original state, would have been quite precious, possibly a relic like the shirt of a saint. The belief at the time of this examination was that the MacLeods were descended from Harald Hardrada, who spent some time in Constantinople in the 11th century. In line with this belief, it was suggested that the flag may have passed from Harald Hardrada down to the eponymous ancestor of the clan—Leod. The MacLeod Estate Office (Dunvegan Castle) website claims that experts have dated the flag to the 4th and 7th centuries—hundreds of years before the Crusades. The flag is currently held in Dunvegan Castle, along with other notable heirlooms such as the Dunvegan Cup and Sir Rory Mor's Horn.

== Tradition and legend ==
=== Thomas Pennant (1772) ===
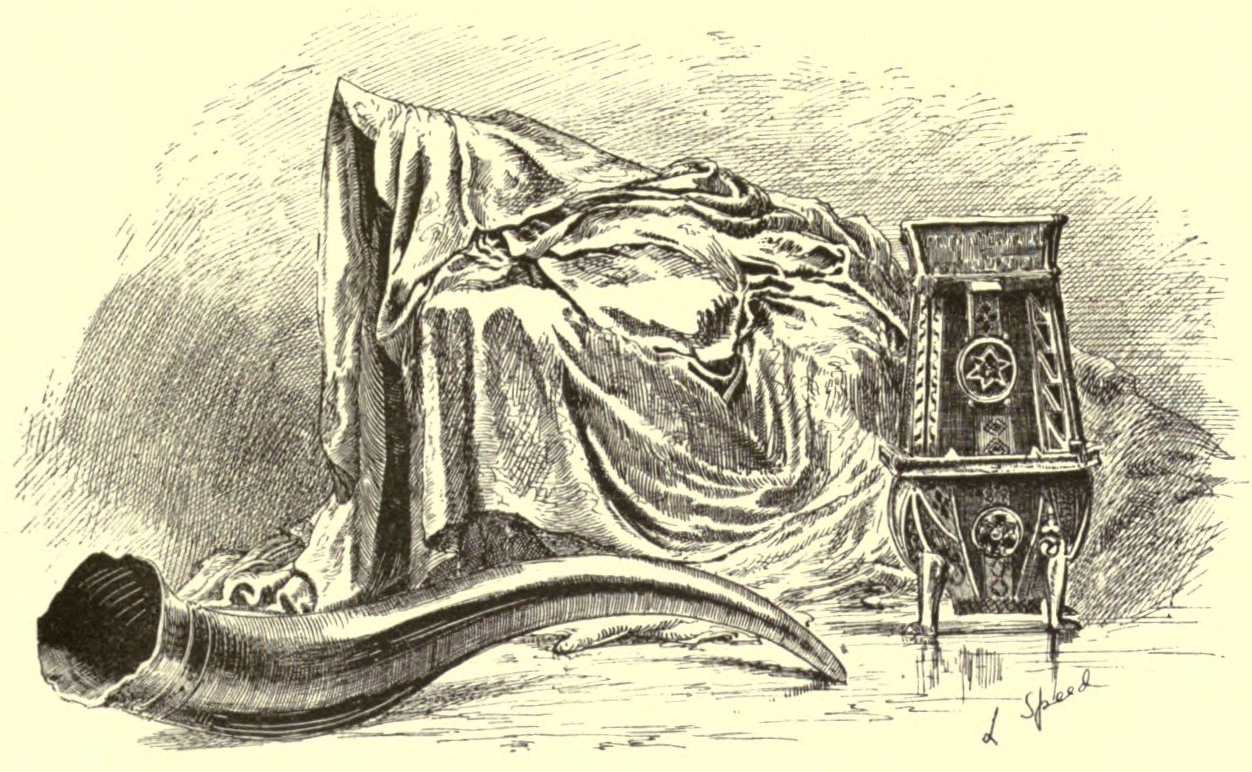
19th century engraving of the Fairy Flag, Sir Rory Mor's Horn, and the Dunvegan Cup.

In 1772, Thomas Pennant made a tour of the Hebrides and later published an account of his travels. One of the things Pennant noted while visiting the Isle of Skye, was the Fairy Flag. According to Pennant, the flag was named "Braolauch shi", and was given to the MacLeods by Titania the "Ben-shi", wife of Oberon, king of the fairies. Titania blessed the flag with powers which would manifest when the flag was unfurled three times. On the third time, the flag and flag-bearer would be carried off by an invisible being, never to be seen again. The family of "Clan y Faitter" had the task of bearing the flag, and in return for their services, they possessed free lands in Bracadale. Pennant related how the flag had already been produced three times. The first occasion was in an unequal battle between the MacLeods and the Macdonalds of Clanranald. On the unfurling of the flag, the MacLeod forces were multiplied by ten. The second time the flag was unfurled to preserve the life of the lady of the clan, and thus saved the clan's heir. Pennant then declared that the flag was unfurled a third time to save his own life. He stated that the flag was by then so tattered that Titania did not seem to think it worth taking back. Pennant also noted the belief of the MacLeod's Norse ancestry and the magical raven banners said to have been used by the Vikings in the British Isles.

=== 19th-century manuscript accounts of the flag ===
Much of the traditional history of the Fairy Flag is preserved in manuscript form. In the early part of the 20th century, Fred T. MacLeod noted one manuscript written around 1800, which he considered to be the most detailed description of the flag. The narrative which Fred T. MacLeod quotes is identical to that found in the Bannatyne manuscript, which documents the traditional history of Clan MacLeod. The Bannatyne manuscript dates to the 1830s but is thought to have been based upon earlier traditions.

==== Description ====
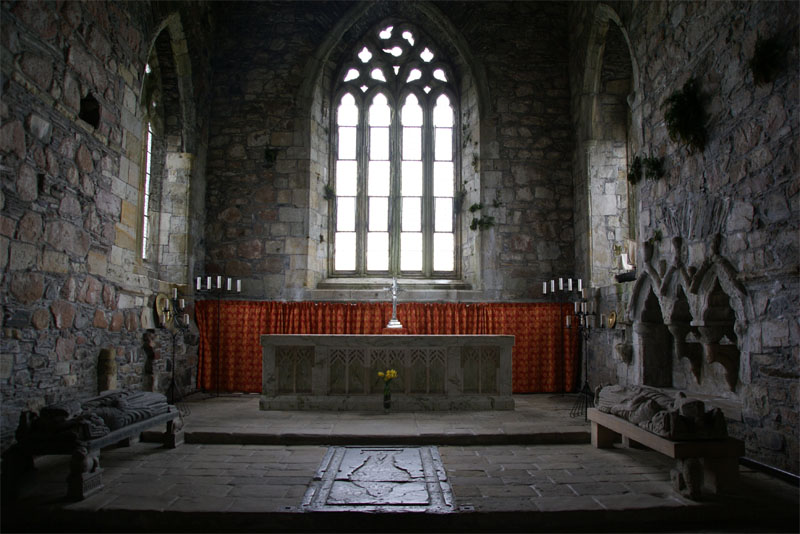
Iona Abbey: the effigy on the floor in the centre may mark the location of the burials of several MacLeod chiefs and one flag bearer.

The c. 1800 manuscript stated that both the honour and the very existence of Clan MacLeod was thought to have depended upon the preservation of the Fairy Flag. Only the "highest and purest blood of the race" and the most renowned heroes, were selected to guard the flag when it was displayed. These twelve men, with a sword in hand, would stand just behind the chief, who was always put in front. One family produced the hereditary keepers of the flag, and of this family, only the eldest living male could unfurl the flag. This family was called "Clan Tormad Vic Vurichie" ("the children of Tormod, son of Murchadh"), and was descended from Sìol Torcaill. The 20th-century Hebridean author Alasdair Alpin MacGregor, when writing of the traditions of the flag, stated that the flag's bearers held lands on Skye near Bracadale for their services to the chiefs of Clan MacLeod. The first of the flag bearers from this family was buried within the same grave as the chief of the clan, on the island of Iona. The second, and last bearer, was buried at St Clements Church, in Rodel, on Harris. This man's remains were covered by a magnificent monument; the stone coffin in which his body was placed was six feet deep. A movable iron grate rested about two feet from the lid, and the man's body rested upon the grate. The man's male descendants were also deposited within this coffin. This meant that when a newly deceased was placed within, the bones and dust of the previous occupant were sifted through the grate into the coffin below. The writer of the manuscript stated that in the time of his own father, the last male of this family was interred this way. The tomb was then sealed by this man's daughter. The c. 1800 manuscript also noted that this family, prior to its extinction, became miserably poor.

==== Unfurling at the Battle of Bloody Bay ====
The Bannatyne manuscript states that the flag was unfurled at the Battle of Bloody Bay in 1480. The manuscript related that during the battle, the clan's chief, William Dubh (c. 1415–1480), was slain, and in consequence his clan began to lose heart. A priest then ordered the flag's bearer, Murcha Breac, to unfurl the Fairy Flag to rally the clan. Up until this point, the MacLeods of Harris and Dunvegan were on the opposing side of their kinsmen, the MacLeods of Lewis. However, once the MacLeods of Lewis noticed that the flag had been unfurled, they switched sides to join forces with their kinsmen. Unfortunately for both MacLeod clans, the outcome of the battle had already been determined and they were on the losing side. Among the vast numbers of MacLeods slain were Murcha Breac and the twelve guardians of the flag. William Dubh is buried on the island of Iona with his predecessors, and the body of Murcha Breac is placed within the same tomb. The manuscript states that this was the greatest honour which could be bestowed upon his remains. R. C. MacLeod suggested that the MacLeod effigy within Iona Abbey may mark the burial of the first chiefs of the clan, as well as William Dubh, and the mentioned standard bearer. William Dubh is thought to have been the last MacLeod chief buried on Iona; his son, Alasdair Crotach (1450–1547), was buried in St Clements Church, on Harris.

==== Unfurling at the Battle of Glendale ====
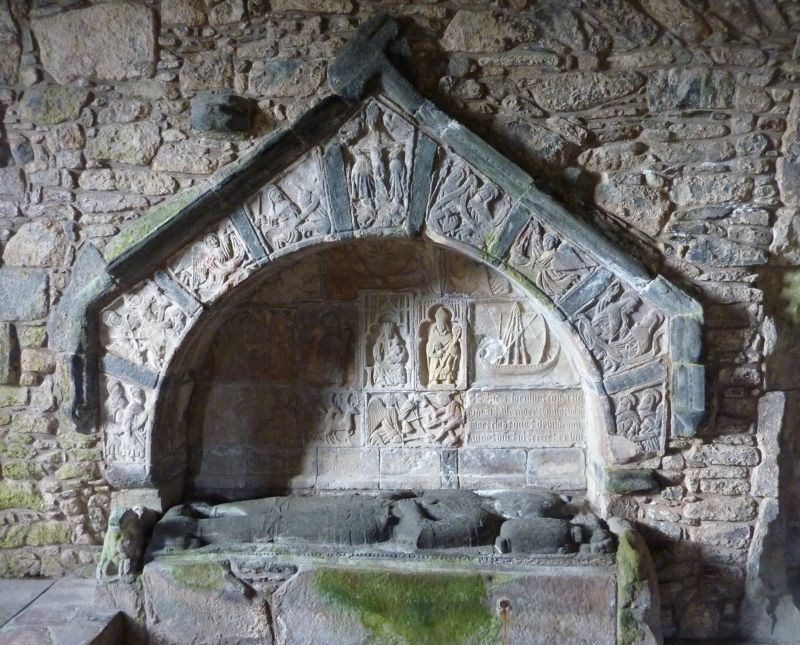
Tomb of Alasdair Crotach (1450–1547), St Clement's Church, Rodel, Harris. Male descendants of the flag's bearers were said to be entombed within the same church until the lineage died out.

According to the Bannatyne manuscript, the Fairy Flag was also unfurled during the Battle of Glendale, which the manuscript states to have been fought in about 1490. At one point during this conflict, both the MacLeods of Harris and Dunvegan, and the MacLeods of Lewis were on the verge of giving way to the invading MacDonalds. Just at this moment, the mother of Alasdair Crotach, chief of the MacLeods of Harris and Dunvegan, ordered the Fairy Flag to be unfurled. The result was that both MacLeod clans renewed the battle with redoubled fury and, despite immense losses, eventually won the battle. Among the MacLeod dead was the flag bearer, Paul Dubh, who carried the Fairy Flag throughout the conflict until his death. The Bannatyne manuscript relates that Paul Dubh was honourably buried in a deep stone coffin, with a metal grate – much like the account given in the c. 1800 manuscript. The writer of the Bannatyne manuscript states that each successive flag bearer was buried within this tomb, and that the writer's own grandfather saw the old ceremony performed for the last time, in the 18th century. The Bannatyne manuscript states that the tomb is located in the north-east corner of the chancel at St Clements Church, in Rodel. R. C. MacLeod noted that there was no trace of such a coffin or tomb, although he suggested that it could have been buried or possibly built within a wall.

==== Legend of origin ====
The c. 1800 manuscript presented a legend of the Fairy Flag's origin. This legend concerned a MacLeod who went on a Crusade to the Holy Land. On his journey homewards, the MacLeod attempted to cross a dangerous mountainous pass on the borders of Palestine. Here, he met a hermit who gave him food and shelter. The hermit warned the MacLeod of a dangerous spirit that guards the pass, which had never failed to destroy a true believer. However, with the aid of a piece of the True Cross and certain directions from the hermit, the MacLeod is able to defeat the "She Devil"—who is called "Nein a Phaipen, or Daughter of Thunder". In reward for conveying some secrets that the spirit wanted some friends to know, she revealed to the MacLeod "the future destinies of the Clan". The writer of the c. 1800 manuscript stated that this knowledge was said to have been held by this man's family until its extinction. The spirit then gave the Macleod her girdle, telling him to convert it into a banner. The MacLeod then used his spear as a flag pole. The writer of the c. 1800 manuscript stated that the spear was by then since lost, and that the secrets conveyed to MacLeod were lost forever. The writer also gave his own opinion on the origin of the Fairy Flag. The writer stated that the flag most probably originated as a banner used in the Holy Land, and that it was conveyed back home by the character portrayed in the legend.

==== Other episodes ====
The c. 1800 manuscript related that the spell of the banner meant that it would vanish when it was displayed for the third time. The final unfurling of the banner would either gain the clan a complete victory over their enemies or meant that the clan was to suffer total extinction. The writer of the c. 1800 manuscript went on to state that the temptation for unfurling the flag for the third and final time was always resisted; and that at the time of his writing, there was not much chance of it ever being unfurled again, since it was in such a reduced state. The writer stated that of the few shreds that remained, he himself possessed a fragment.

The c. 1800 manuscript also stated that the flag was once held in an iron chest, within Dunvegan Castle. The key to the chest was then always in the possession of the hereditary flag bearers. The c. 1800 manuscript related how, on the death of the MacLeod chief Tormod, son of lain Breac, the succession to the chiefship nearly fell to the family of the MacLeods of Talisker. The young widow of the last chief refused to give up Dunvegan Castle to the next heir, knowing herself to be pregnant (although she had only been married six weeks previous to her widowhood). In time, she gave birth to Tormod, the next chief. The c. 1800 manuscript stated that at around this time, a man who wished to curry favour with the expectant heir (MacLeod of Talisker) attempted to steal the flag. Even though the Fairy Flag was later found, both the staff and iron chest were never seen again. Historically, the old chief, Tormod (son of Iain Breac), died in the autumn of 1706, and his son, Tormod, was born in July 1705.

=== Reported partial fulfilment prophecy around 1800 ===
Late in his life, the writer Norman Macleod (1783–1862) related to one of his daughters of having heard an old Gaelic prophecy concerning the flag, and of events which took place in his childhood which were reported as examples of the prophecy being partially fulfilled. A summarised version of this prophecy was published in the late 19th century, within an account of the life of one of his sons. Soon after, in 1878, Alexander Mackenzie proposed that the prophecy as dictated by N. Macleod, may have been a fragmented remembrance of one of the prophecies of Coinneach Odhar (who is popularly known as the Brahan Seer). N. Macleod's tale of the prophecy is as follows:

Of the Macleod family it was prophesied at least a hundred years prior to the circumstance which I am about to relate. In the prophecy to which I allude it was foretold, that when Norman, the third Norman ('Tormaid nan' tri Tormaid'), the son of the hard-boned English lady ('Mac na mnatha Caoile cruaidh Shassanaich'), would perish by an accidental death; that when the 'Maidens' of Macleod (certain well-known rocks on the coast of Macleod's country) became the property of a Campbell; when a fox had young ones in one of the turrets of the Castle, and, particularly, when the Fairy enchanted banner should be for the last time exhibited, then the glory of the Macleod family should depart; a great part of the estate should be sold to others, so that a small 'curragh', or boat, would carry all gentlemen of the name of Macleod across Loch Dunvegan; but that in times far distant another John Breac should arise, who should redeem those estates, and raise the powers and honour of the house to a higher pitch than ever.

— Norman Macleod

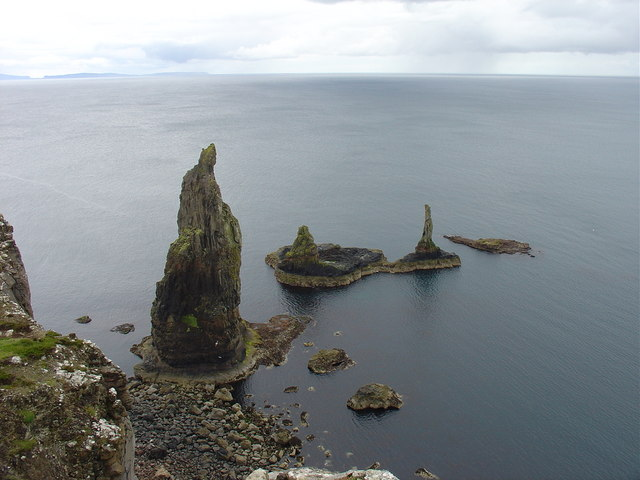
MacLeod's Maidens, located off Skye; the highest stands about 200 feet (60 metres) above sea-level.

N. Macleod then related how as a child, he had been close to an English smith employed at Dunvegan. One day the smith told him in secrecy that the chest in which the flag was held was to be forced open the next morning, and that it had been arranged by Hector Macdonald Buchanan that the smith would be at the castle with the necessary tools. N. Macleod then asked Buchanan for permission to be present, and was granted leave on the condition that he not tell anyone—especially the chief—what was about to be done. The next morning the chest was forced open and the flag was found to be held within a wooden case. N. Macleod described the flag then as being a square-shaped piece of cloth with crosses wrought on it with gold thread, and several "elf spots" stitched onto it. After the flag had been examined, it was placed back into its case. N. Macleod stated that at around this time it was learned that the heir to the chiefship, Norman, was killed at sea. HMS Queen Charlotte, on which he was a lieutenant, caught fire and exploded at sea killing 673 officers and men 17 March 1800 N. Macleod stated that at about the same time, MacLeod's Maidens were sold to Campbell of Ensay. He also stated that he personally saw a fox with cubs, which lived in the west turret of the castle. N. Macleod related how he was grateful that the worst part of the prophecy remained unfulfilled; and that the chiefly family still owned their ancestral lands.

R. C. MacLeod, who wrote in the early 20th century, considered that this prophecy seemed to have been fulfilled. At that time, the Macleod chief had no gentlemen of his clan as tenants on his estate; also, an heir to the family—named Ian Breac—was killed in the First World War. R. C. MacLeod noted that the prophecy stated that a "John Breac" (Gaelic: Iain Breac, "Iain the speckled") would restore the fortunes of the family. R. C. MacLeod stated his belief that this may still happen, when he lamented the loss of his son, stating that Iain Breac "showed that his race had not lost the loyalty and courage which were their chief claims to glory in ancient days".

=== Walter Scott, 1814 ===
When Sir Walter Scott visited Dunvegan Castle in 1814, he learned of several traditional tales relating to the area and the clan. He was told that the Fairy Flag had three magical properties. The first was that it multiplied the number of men upon a battlefield. The second was that when it was spread upon a nuptial bed, it ensured fertility. The third was that it brought herring into the loch.

=== Other traditions ===
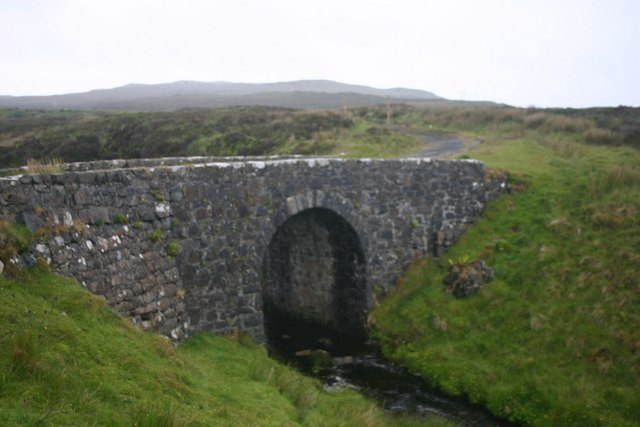
The Fairy Bridge, near Dunvegan.

In the early 20th century, R. C. MacLeod noted several traditions concerning the flag. One told how the flag came into the possession of the MacLeods through a fairy. A similar tradition relates of a fairy-lullaby.

==== Fairy lover ====
The first of these traditions related by R. C. MacLeod tells how one of the chiefs of Clan MacLeod married a fairy; however, after twenty years she was forced to leave him and return to fairyland. She bade farewell to the chief at the Fairy Bridge (which stands about 3 miles or 5 kilometres from Dunvegan) and gave him the flag. She promised that if it was waved in times of danger and distress, help would be given on three occasions. A similar tradition, related by John Arnott MacCulloch, stated that although the fairy's gift had the power to save both her husband and his clan, afterwards an invisible being would come to take both the flag and its bearer away—never to be seen again.

Behold my child, limbed like the kid or fawn, smiting the horses, seizing the accoutrements of the shod horses, the spirited steeds. My little child.

Oh that I could see thy cattle fold, high up on the mountain side; a green, shaggy jacket about thy two white shoulders, with a linen shirt. My little child.

Oh that I could behold thy team of horses; men following them; serving women returning home and the Catanaich sowing the corn.

Oh tender hero whom my womb did bring forth, who did swallow from my breast, who on my knee wast reared.

My child it is, my armful of yew, merry and plump, my bulrush, my flesh and eggs, that will soon be speaking. Last year thou wast beneath my girdle, plant of fertility! and this year fair and playful on my shoulder, thou wilt be going round the homestead.

Oh let me not hear of thy being wounded. Grey do thou become duly. May thy nose grow sharp ere the close of thy day.

Oh! not of Clan Kenneth art thou! Oh! not of Clan Conn. Descendant of a race more esteemed; that of the Clan Leod of swords and armour, whose fathers' native land was Lochlann.

— An English translation of the Gaelic lullaby—Taladh na mna Sithe, The Fairy's Lullaby.

==== Fairy lullaby ====
R. C. MacLeod considered the above 'fairy lover' tradition to be connected to another about a lullaby. This tradition originated with Neil MacLeod, who was the clan bard in the last half of the 19th century; he obtained the tradition from several old women in 'MacLeod country'. This lullaby tradition related how on an autumn night, a beautiful fairy visited Dunvegan Castle. She passed through several closed doors and entered the nursery where the infant heir to the chief was lying in his cradle. The nursemaid, who was within the room as well, was rendered powerless by a spell and could only watch as the fairy took the infant on her knee and sang him a lullaby. This song was so remarkable that it was imprinted upon the nursemaid's memory, and later she lulled the baby asleep by singing the same song. R. C. MacLeod stated that, over time it was believed that any infant of the chiefly family to whom this lullaby was sung would be protected by the power of the fairies. For a while, no nurse was employed by the family who could not sing this song. A period of 200 years then passed before any chief had been born within the castle, and the custom of singing the fairy's lullaby ceased to be followed—but according to R. C. MacLeod, not completely forgotten. R. C. MacLeod claimed that a nursemaid sang this lullaby at the castle in the year 1847, for his infant elder brother, who would later become Sir Reginald MacLeod of MacLeod (1847–1935), 27th chief of the clan.

==== Fairy music ====
Another tradition, related by R. C. MacLeod, told of certain events which took place after an heir to the clan's chiefship was born. The story related how at this time, there was much rejoicing at Dunvegan Castle, and since the infant's nursemaid was anxious to join in the festivities in the hall below, she left the infant alone in her room. When the baby awoke, crying of cold, no human help could hear him in his secluded room; however, a host of fairies appeared and wrapped the infant in the Fairy Flag. Meanwhile, the clansmen banqueting below demanded to see the child and the maid was ordered to bring him forth. When she brought out the baby, wrapped in the flag, everyone gazed in wonder at the child and the garb wrapped around him. The room was filled with the fairies' song which declared that the flag had the power to save the clan three times. When the song ended, and silence fell across the crowded room, the flag was taken from the infant and locked in a chest where it has ever since been preserved.

==== Eastern origins ====
R. C. MacLeod listed another tradition, somewhat similar to the one that appeared in the c. 1800 manuscript. According to this version, a MacLeod joined a Crusading army, and went to the Holy Land. While in the desert-wilderness, he came across a witch, from whom he managed to escape. He then came upon a river, and proceeded to cross it at a ford. However, a fairy maiden appeared from the water and blocked his passage. After a struggle, MacLeod overcame the fairy and passed over the river. He then became friends with her. Before they parted, the fairy maiden gave him a box of scented wood; this box, she told him, held several other smaller boxes, which fitted inside one another. She told him that the innermost box contained a magic banner, which when waved would bring forth a host of armed men to aid its owner. The fairy warned the MacLeod, that if he were to open the box within a year and a day from then, that no crops would grow on his land, no livestock would be born, as well as no children. When the MacLeod returned home he gave the box to the chief's wife. The wife, however, ignored the MacLeod's warning, and opened the box. Immediately a host of armed men appeared and that year, no children were born. The tradition concluded that ever since that time, the flag had been preserved for a time when such an army might mean salvation for the clan.

==== Unfurled numerous times ====
R. C. MacLeod wrote of another tradition which stated that the flag was waved at a battle in Waternish, in about 1580; and of another which told of how it was waved during a time when a cattle plague was raging, and that it stopped the murrain. R. C. MacLeod stated his belief that the flag would only have been waved twice, and so rejected the tradition of it being unfurled at the Battle of Bloody Bay, because the MacLeods were on the losing side. R. C. MacLeod also wondered if it had been waved in 1600, when the clan was in a desperate state in the midst of warring with the Macdonalds of Sleat.

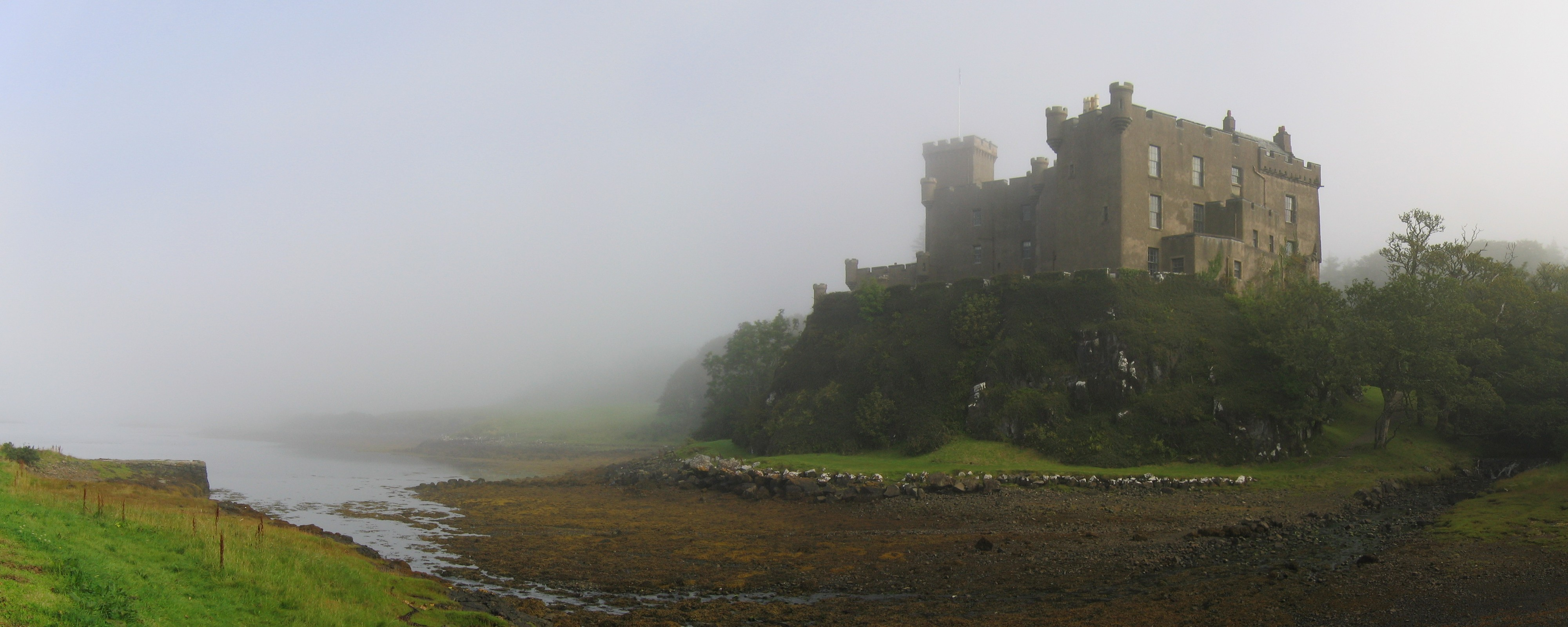
Dunvegan Castle on the Isle of Skye in the mist, August 2007.

=== Supposed powers of the flag in the 20th century ===
In 1938, a fire broke out in a wing of Dunvegan Castle, and according to Sir Iain Moncreiffe of that Ilk, the flames were checked and extinguished when the flag was carried past to safety. During the Second World War, the chief of the clan, Dame Flora MacLeod of MacLeod, received a letter from a member of the clan who attributed his luck during bombing missions over Germany to a photo of the flag which he carried in his pocket.
