= Olivia Savoie =

US family heirloom biographer

Olivia Savoie is an American family heirloom biographer (also known as a life story writer) who owns Raconteur Life Story Writing. She writes and produces keepsake biographies that are often published with the purpose of informing and inspiring children, grandchildren, and future generations.

Savoie grew up in [[Louisiana]]. Around the time she graduated from the University of Louisiana at Lafayette with a degree in English and history, she interviewed her grandmothers and wrote their personal histories. Publishing their life stories for her family led her to desire to do the same for other families.

== Work ==
In 2016, Savoie co-founded Raconteur Life Story Writing with her husband Joshua Savoie and has written dozens of life story books for people in the United States and abroad.

Most of Savoie's life story book subjects are in their 70s, 80s, or 90s. According to The Acadiana Advocate, Raconteur is "a life story writing business where clients become like family and everyone’s story is worth telling.”

Savoie has been featured in more than 30 newspaper and magazine articles, radio shows, and TV programs, including The Kelly Clarkson Show, and CBS Mornings. Her personal writings, often about her grandparents or bonds with her subjects, have been published by regional and national publications, including Today.com and Business Insider.

== Select past projects ==
- An Instrument of Love: The Story of Fr. Floyd J. Calais (Catholic Priest)
- Isn't It Beautiful: The Story of Don Briggs
- Meaningful Memories of Dr. David H. Fisher
- Mitch and Doug's Life Travels
- The Trek of Fred Clive Vollman
- You Are Going to Be Somebody Special: The Story of J. David Strother
- The Memoir of Joseph Frank Dubicki (Holocaust survivor)
