= Mether =

Celtic communal drinking vessel

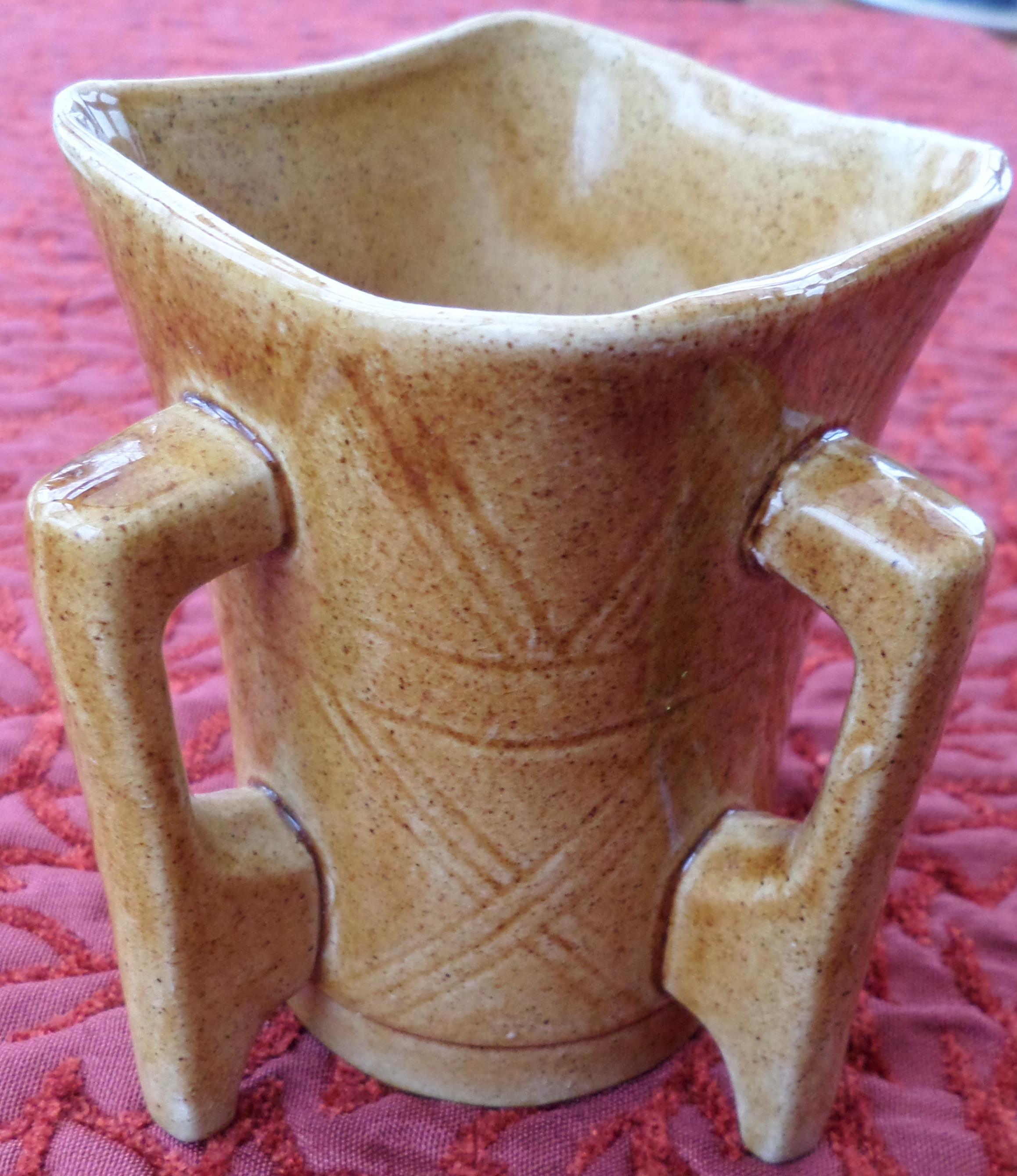
A ceramic mether from Ireland

A mether (/ˈmɛðər/; Irish: meadar) is a communal or 'friendship' drinking vessel from the Celtic tradition, mainly present in Ireland. Originally it was used solely for mead and was made of wood although they might have later added silver ornamentation. The name 'Mether' is said to be derived from 'meth', which is the old name for mead as in the Welsh for mead that is 'medd', and the word 'metheglin' derived from the compound word 'meddyglyn', 'healing liquor'. Wooden methers have been recovered from Irish peat bogs. Another possibility is that the name may come from the Irish Gaelic "Mehill" meaning a 'gathering'.

The best known ancient Mether in Scotland is the Dunvegan Cup, a 10th-century wooden artifact ornamented with silver in the 15th century. Probably Irish in origin, but belonging to the Clan MacLeod, the Dunvegan mether is held in the clan collection at Dunvegan Castle.

== Characteristics ==
Methers are typically made of woods such as crab apple, alder, willow, sycamore, etc. with a four side top and oval or circular bottom. Methers have multiple handles, placed at the foot of the vessel and sometimes extending below the handle bottom to serve as feet as well as handles. The number of handles varies from one to four and the vessel height varies from 6 to 12 inches (15 cm to 30 cm) with a capacity of one to three pints. The multiple handles make it easier to pass from one person to the next.

== Use ==
Visitors were formally welcomed in 'peace and friendship' with a mether. Each drinker passes the cup only to the right (sun-wise) for luck. The cup is held in both hands. It was also used for communal drinking and drinking bouts by common people. The mether is designed to be used by drinking from one of the four corners. A drink taken in haste can cause the mead to overflow onto the drinker, with humorous consequences. This would add to the festive air on the occasions of rural tasks such as funerals, weddings, fairs, sowing, haymaking, reaping, threshing, and thatching.

Methers were also used for drinking other fluids such as milk, buttermilk, etc.

=== Examples ===
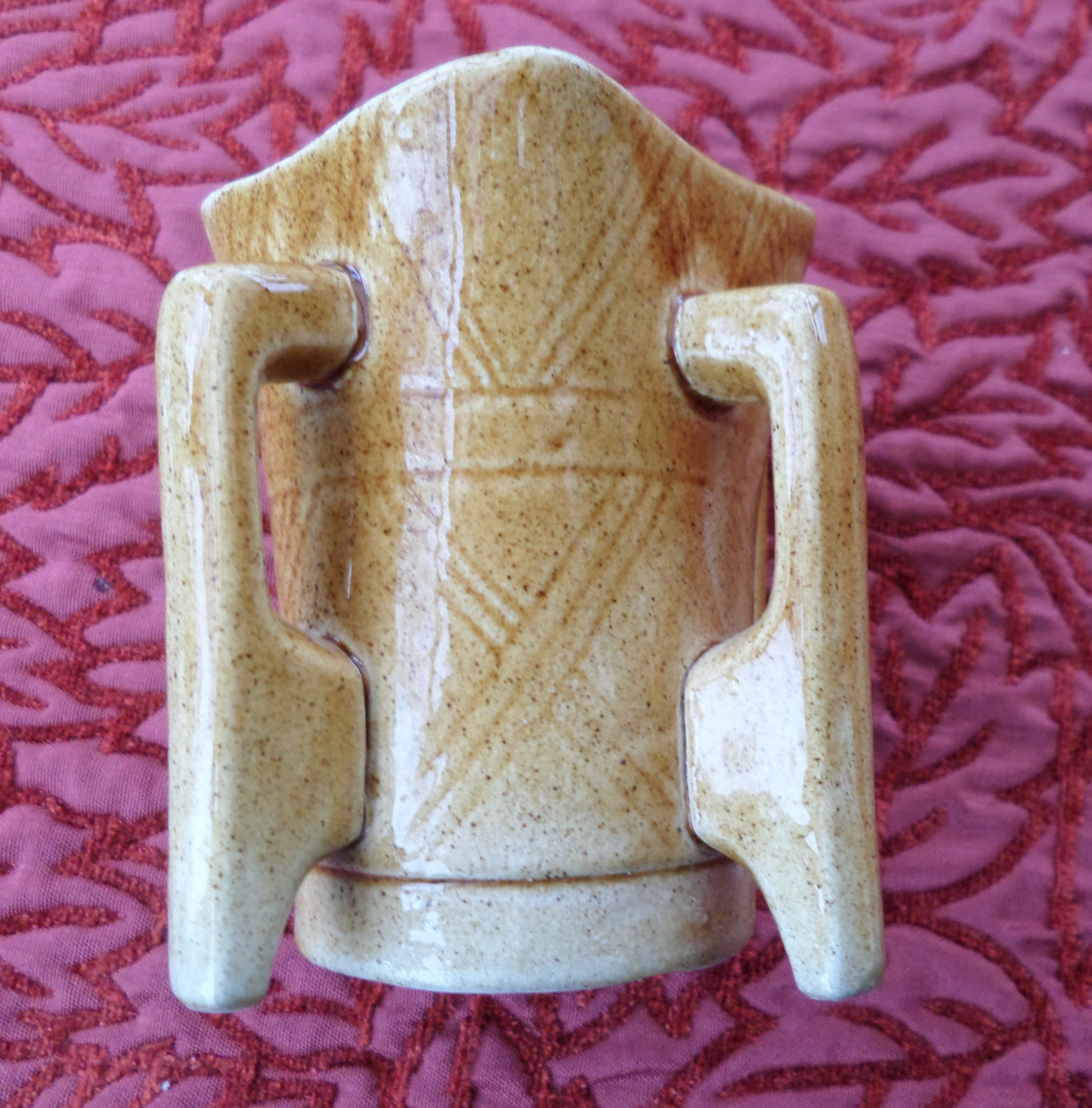

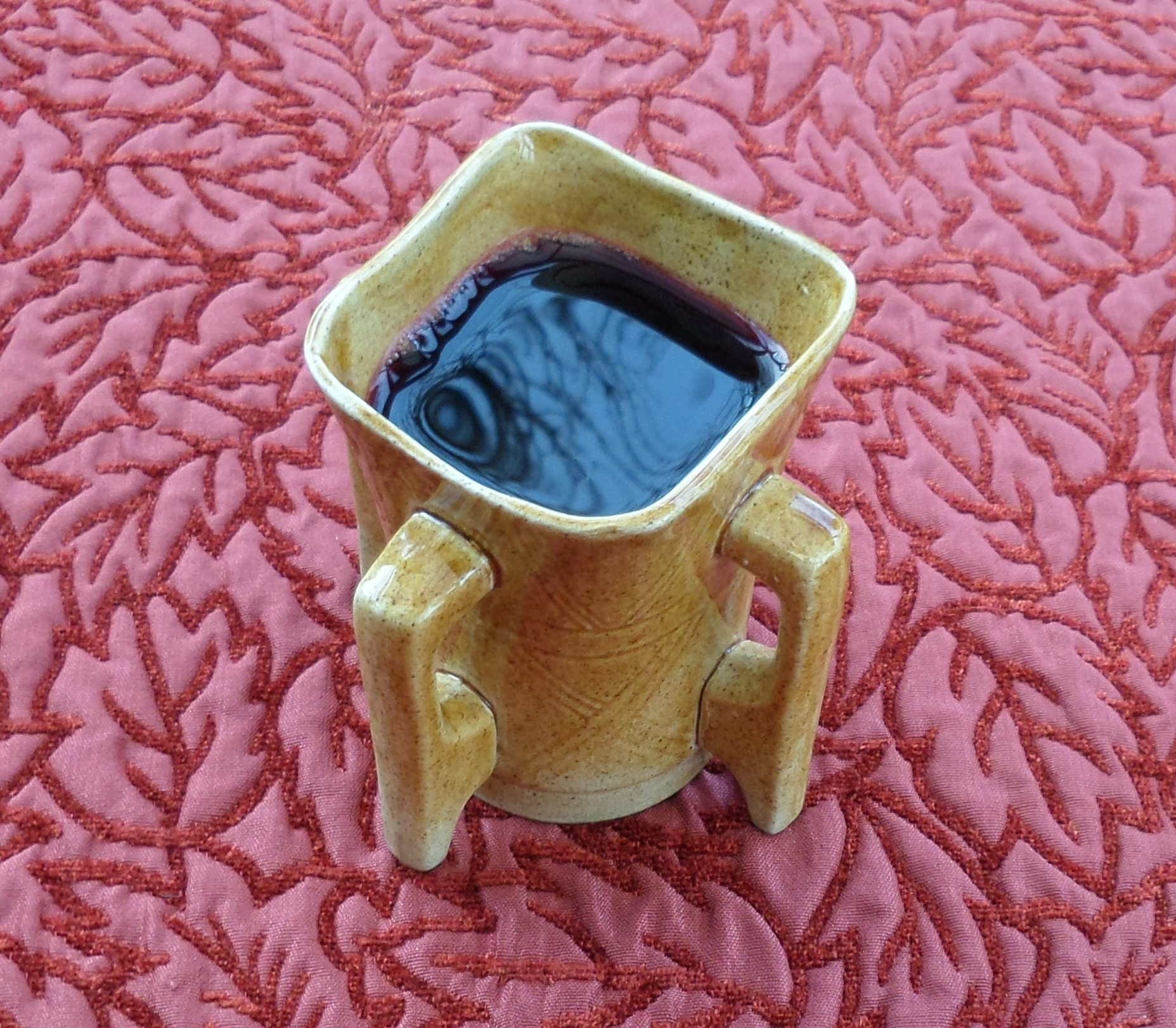

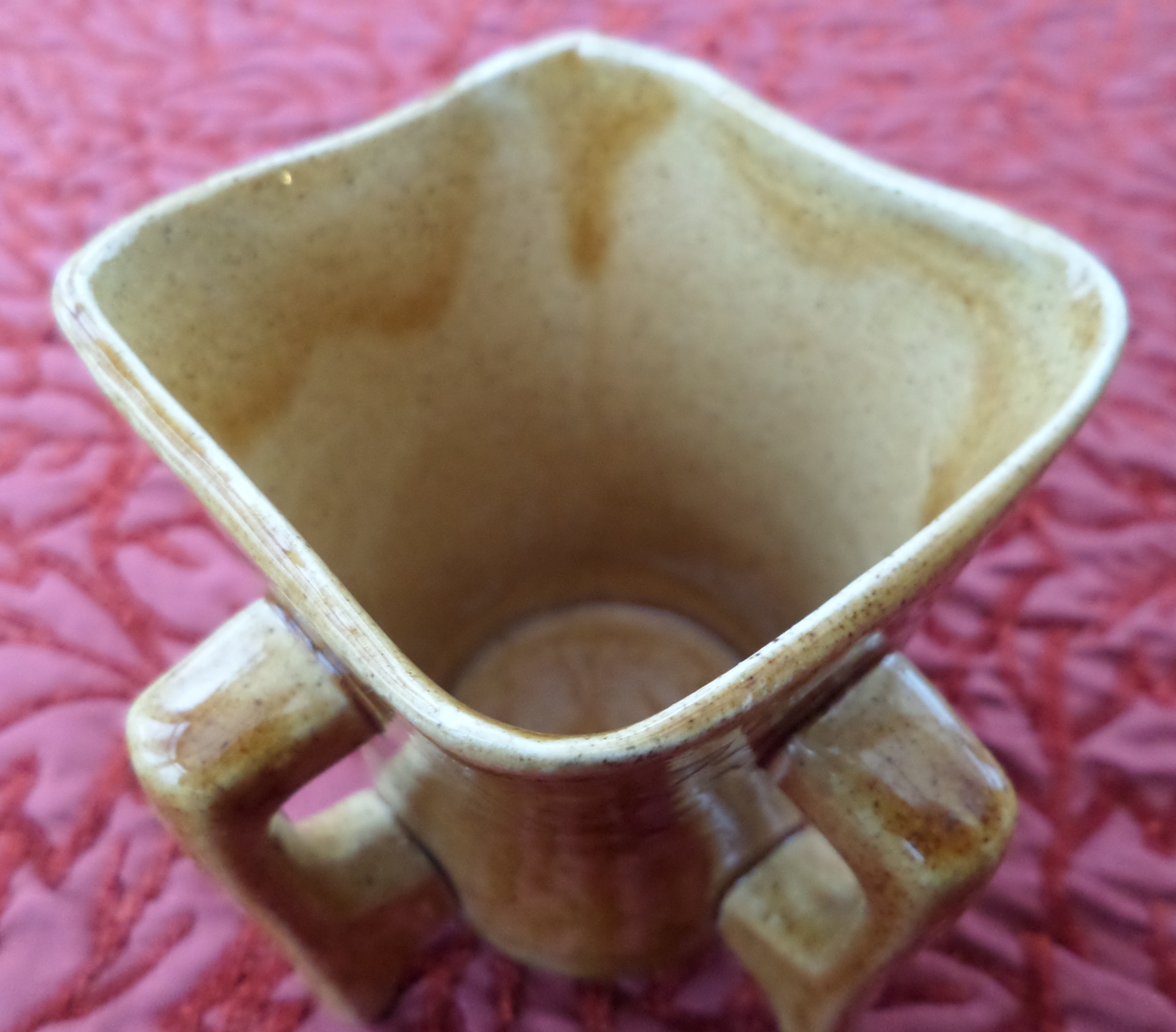

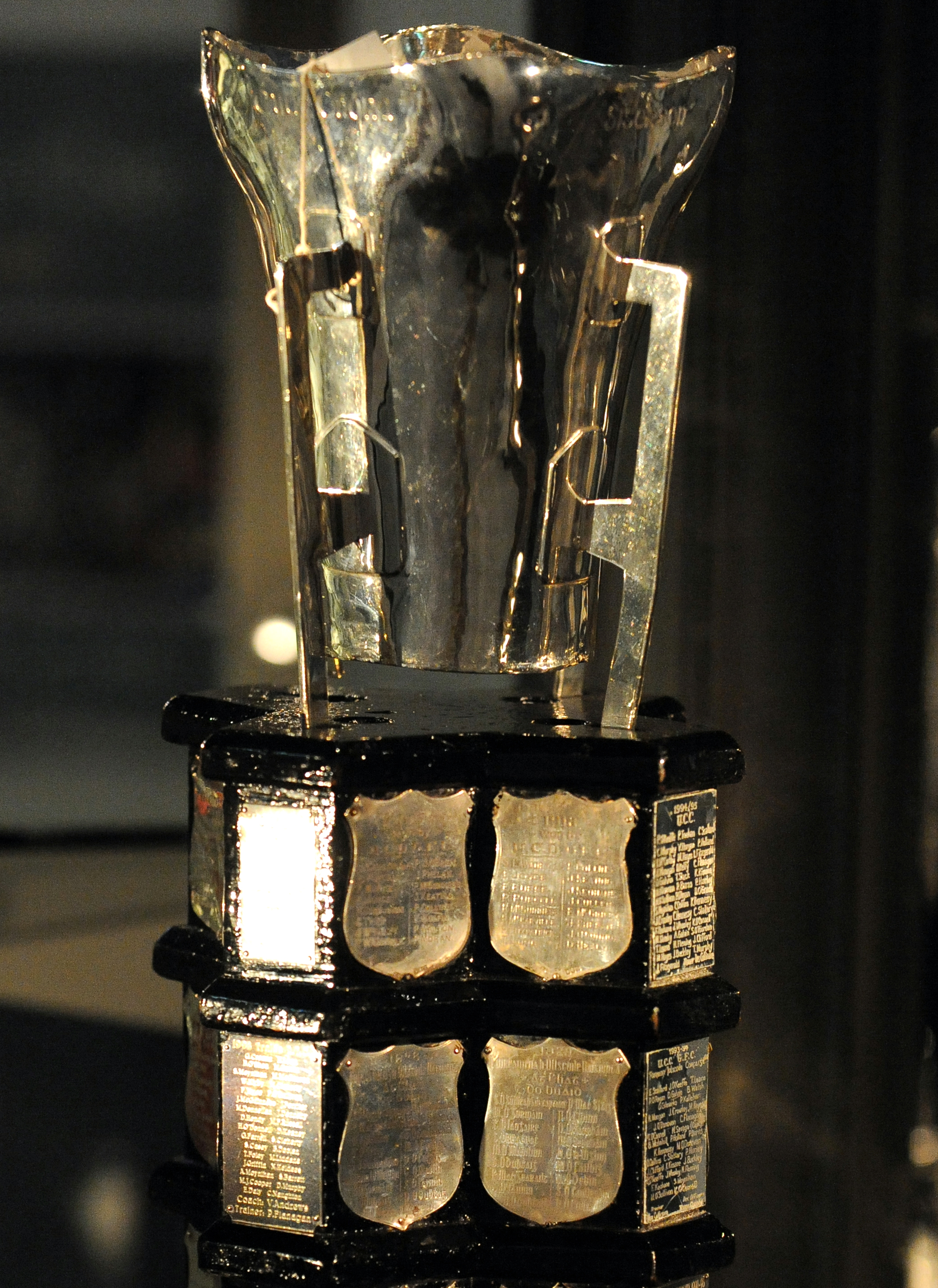

Small mether cups made from silver, not exceeding 3" in height (7.5 cm) and often with three to four handles were produced by silversmiths in the 18th and 20th centuries as an award, such as the Sigerson Cup for Gaelic Football; the Liam MacCarthy Cup and Dr Harty Cup for Hurling; and christening cups. Pottery examples exist, such as Hedingham-ware with four feet around 6 inches high.

== Legend ==
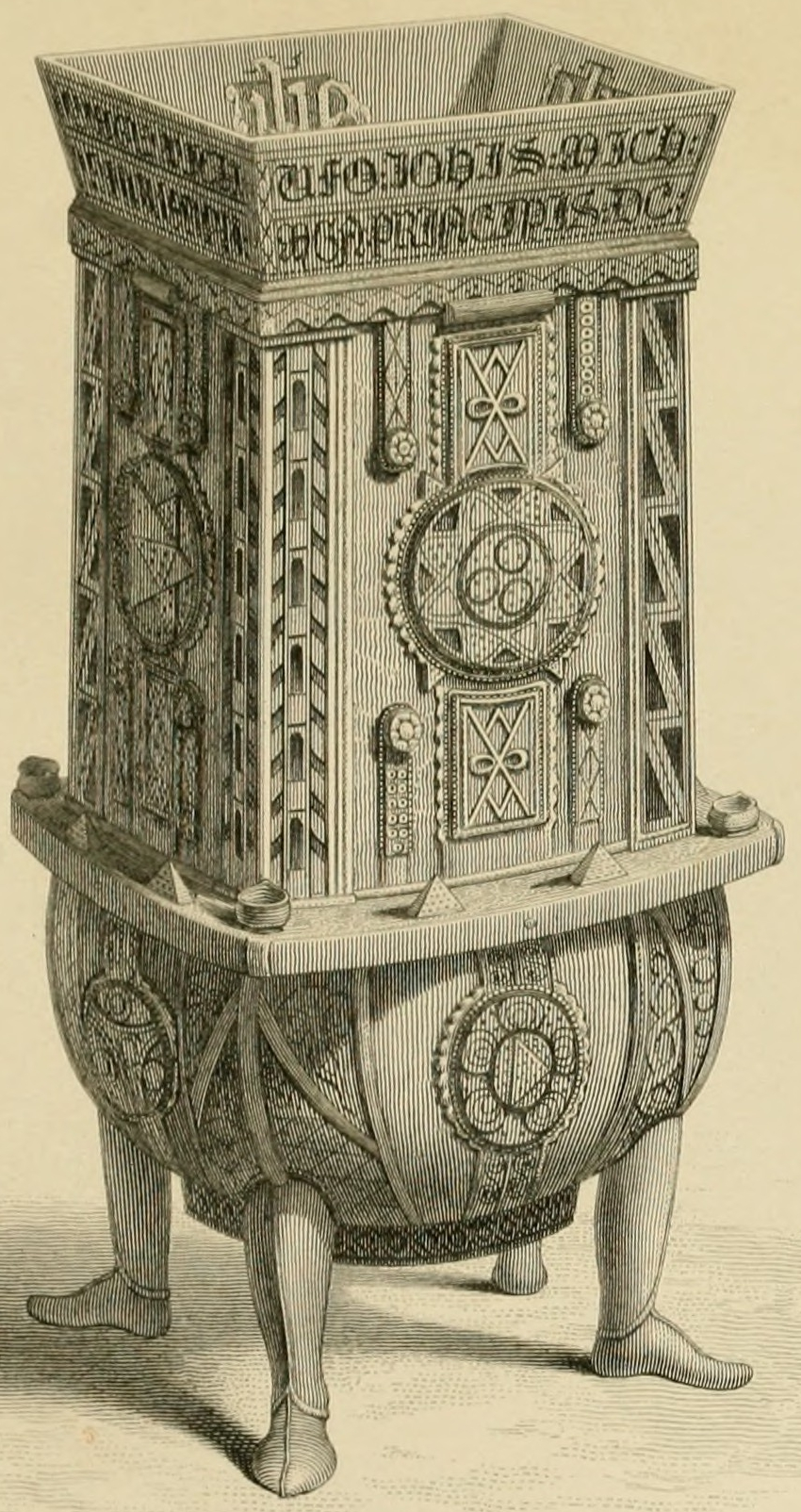
A 19th-century engraving of the Dunvegan Cup

King Tuathal in the 2nd Century A.D. had seen Roman drinking vessels with handles and decided to introduce this style to Ireland. The King instructed his smith who held the resulting cup by the handle so that the king could not grasp it except by cupping it as he would normally. The smith was asked to add a second handle to overcome this, but he held the cup by both handles leaving the king with no handle to grasp. A third handle was added, but the smith presented the vessel to Tuathal by holding the cup by two handles and pointing the third towards himself. A fourth handle was duly added, the final solution found and the mether born.

The mether is mentioned in The Fate of the Children of Lir (14th century), when Fionnuala laments "There is our food and our wine, they are The white sand and bitter brine; – [Yet] often drank we hazel mead. From round cups with four lips." (original Middle Irish: chuachán cruinn cheithre g-cearn).

== Micro-history ==
The library of the Royal Irish Academy holds a translation of The Hospitality of the House of Two Methers an Irish tale said to have been a favourite of St. Patrick and part of the oral folklore of his day.

Methers can be found in a number of private collections and museums, sometimes decorated and once hereditary treasures of famous Celtic families.
