= Dunvegan Cup =

Heirloom of the chiefs of Clan MacLeod

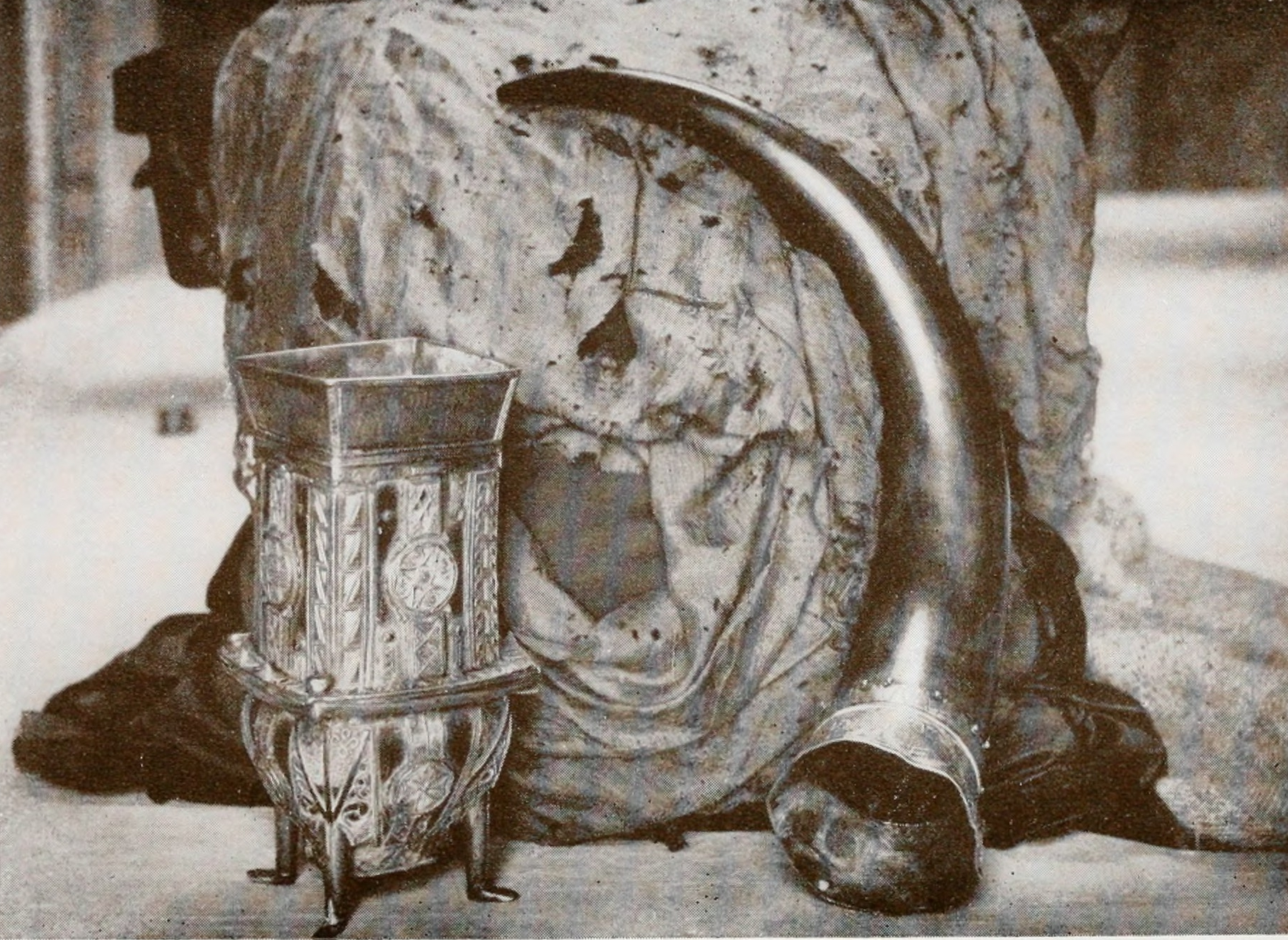
The Dunvegan Cup, Fairy Flag, and Sir Rory Mor's Horn are heirlooms of the Macleods of Dunvegan. This photo was taken sometime before 1927.

The Dunvegan Cup is a wooden ceremonial cup, decorated with silver plates, which dates to 1493. It was created at the request of Caitríona, wife of John Maguire, lord of Fermanagh in Ireland. The cup is an heirloom of the Macleods of Dunvegan, and is held at their seat of Dunvegan Castle in Scotland.

There are several traditions attributed to the cup, describing how the Macleods obtained it. But scholars believe that the cup was acquired by the clan sometime in the 16th or 17th century. The Macleod chiefs have several other notable heirlooms kept at Dunvegan Castle, such as the Fairy Flag and Sir Rory Mor's Horn (all three pictured right). The Bute Mazer is another medieval Scottish ceremonial cup.

== Description ==
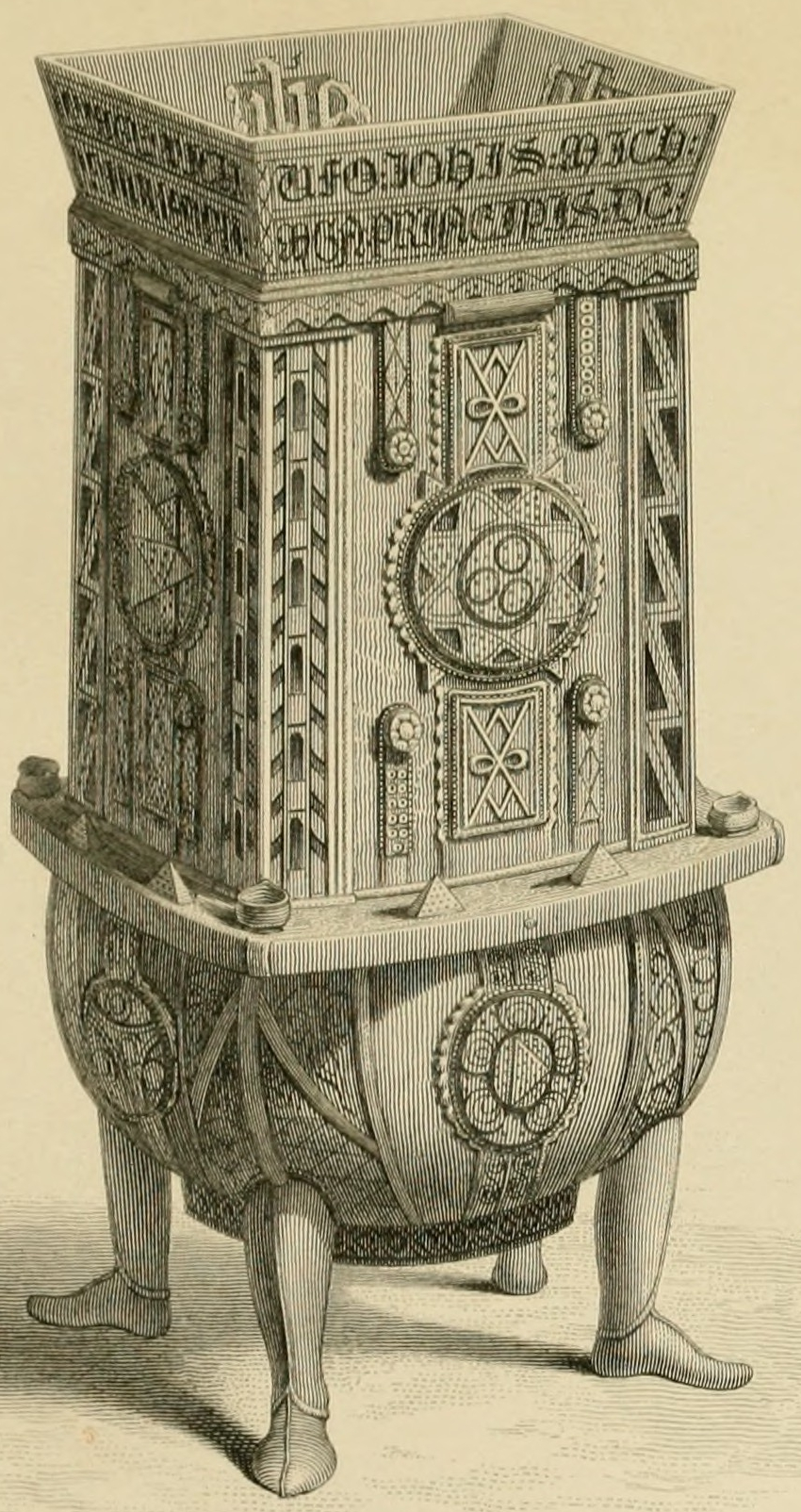
A 19th-century engraving of the Dunvegan Cup

The Dunvegan Cup is a wooden ceremonial cup, made of wood and elaborately decorated with silver. It is square shaped at the top and rounded at the bottom, and stands on four legs. Sir Walter Scott examined the cup and, in 1815 in The Lord of the Isles, gave its measurements as: 10.5 inches (27 cm) in height on the outside, 9.75 inches (24.8 cm) in depth in the inside, 4.5 inches (11 cm) the extreme breadth over the mouth. In around the 1850s, Alexander Nesbitt gave similar measurements, and added that it was 5.5 inches (14 cm) at the broadest point of the cup, which is somewhat below the middle.

The cup is constructed mostly of wood. Scott thought it was possibly oak. Nesbitt later surmised that the wood was either yew or alder. The cup is covered with mountings of silver, wrought in filigree and decorated with niello and gilding. The mouth of the cup has a rim of solid silver-gilt, 2 inches (5.1 cm) in depth.

On the outside of the rim is an engraved inscription in black lettering in two lines. The spaces between the letters are hatched with fine lines, which intersect diagonally. The angels of the rim have strips ornamented with niello. The inside of the rim is plain by comparison; except for the letter I.H.S. repeated on all four sides. This is a Christogram representing Jesus Christ. Each side of the cup has varied designs of triangles and circles. R.C. MacLeod considered these to be representations of the Trinity and Eternity. Ian Finlay described the circled, six-pointed stars as not unlike those on the outer-side of the Domnach Airgid, which is held in the National Museum of Ireland. Empty sockets on the outside of the cup are thought to have once held stones, or glass. Several somewhat smaller sockets still hold beads of coral. The silver legs are in the form of human legs; and are ornamented with a twisted wire which runs down the front. The feet wear shoes, which are covered in niello, and the legs are gilt. Everywhere except the rim, the silver is very thin, and in consequence has suffered a great deal of damage over the years. The cup has been classified as a mether, a communal drinking cup used at ceremonial events, by its square shape at the top and rounded bottom.

== History ==
=== Earliest references to the cup ===
According to F.T. MacLeod, the first published accounts of the cup were made by Sir Walter Scott, and Sir Daniel Wilson in the early 19th century. F.T. MacLeod noted that three earlier visitors to Dunvegan Castle— Samuel Johnson, James Boswell, and Thomas Pennant— made no mention of having seen the cup. Scott mentioned the cup within the explanatory note on the following lines, in The Lord of the Isles.

"Fill me the mighty cup!" he said,

"Erst own'd by the royal Somerled:
Fill it, till on the studded brim
In burning gold and bubbles swim,
And every gem of varried shine

Glow doubly bright in rosy wine!

— Sir Walter Scott, The Lord of the Isles

=== Differing transcriptions ===
Front side

Right side

Back side

Left side

Scott attempted to transcribe the Latin inscription on the silver rim of the cup. His early attempt at transcribing the inscription differs significantly from later attempts by others. Scott's transcription and translation is as follows.

Scott's rendering into Latin	Scott's translation into English
Ufo Johanis Mich Magni Principis de Hr Manae Vich Liahia Magryneil et sperat Domino Ihesu dari clementiam illorum opera. Fecit Anno Domini 993 Onili Oimi.	Ufo, the son of John, the son of Magnus, Prince of Man, the grandson of Liahia Macgryneil, trust in the Lord Jesus that their works will obtain mercy. Oneil Oimi made this in the year of God nine hundred and ninety-three.

Scott's rendering of the cup's inscription made him believe that it was a Hebridean drinking cup, dating from the year 993. Scott said that Macleod tradition held that the cup had once belonged to "Neil Ghlune-Dhu, or Black-knee. But who this Neil was, no one pretends to say". In about 1851, Sir Daniel Wilson documented the cup in his The Archaeology and Prehistoric Annals of Scotland, following along the same lines as Scott. Wilson made a few minor edits to Scott's rendering of the Latin inscription, but at the time he had not seen the cup. After certain correspondence and the aid of William Forbes Skene, Wilson examined the cup in person and later amended his analysis.

His subsequent rendering of the inscription was vastly different from Scott's. In addition, Wilson concluded that the cup was a product of Irish craftsmanship, rather than of Scottish origin. Wilson's new rendering of the inscription had the cup belonging to a "Katharina nig Ryneill"; and he considered that the John, son of the Maguire, who was mentioned in the transcription, was the same as the one mentioned in the Annals of the Four Masters in the year 1484. Wilson said that this John died in 1511, and that his wife was unknown; but that a Catherine, who was the daughter of MacRannal, was married to a Maguire. She was noted as dying in 1490.

At about the same time, Eugene O'Curry, of the Brehon Law Commission, examined the cup and transcribed the inscription. Alexander Nesbitt noted O'Curry's transcription and pointed out that the last part of the inscription was from the fifteenth verse of the 145th Psalm. O'Curry rendered the woman's name as "Katherina ingen ui Neill"; this made her an O'Neill, rather than a MacRannal. Nesbitt noted that John Maguire is recorded several times in the Annals of the Four Masters; and that he became one of the chiefs of the Maguires in 1484. Nesbitt stated that John Maguire died in 1503; and that he could not find Katharine O'Neill, within the annals.

Wilson's amended rendering	O'Curry's rendering into Latin
Katharina nig Ryneill, uxor Johannis Meg Maguir principis de Firmanach, me fieri Fecit. Anno Domini 1493. Oculi omnium in te sperant Domine, et tu das escam illorum in tempore opportuno.	Katherina ingen ui Neill uxor Johannis Meguighir principis de Firmanach me fieri fecit. Anno Domini, 1493°. Oculi omnium in te spectant Domine et tu das escam illorum in tempore opportuno.

Later, Roderick Charles MacLeod transcribed the inscription. He gave the woman's name as "Katharina Nig Ry Neil"—Katharina, daughter of King Neil. R.C. MacLeod said that Macleod legend assigned the cup to Niall Glúndub, and that the cup might have passed down to Katharina from him, or the cup may have been attributed to him by his descendants. R.C. MacLeod later claimed that tradition held that the wooden bowl dated from the 10th century, and that it was the property of Niall Glúndub, the 10th-century Irish king of Cenél nEógain, R.C. MacLeod does not rule out the possibility of the ornamentation having been added to the cup at a later date; the silver work has been dated to the 14th century at the earliest. The dated inscription puts it at 1493.

R. C. MacLeod's rendering into Latin	R. C. MacLeod's translation into English
Katharina Nig Ry Neil Uxor Johannis meg Macguire, principis de Fermanae me fieri fecit anno Domini 1493.	Katharina, daughter of King Neil, wife of John, grandson of Macguire, prince of Firmanagh, had me made in the year of the Lord 1493.
Oculi omnium te sperant Domine et tu das esca illorum in tempore opportuno	The eyes of all wait on Thee; and Thou givest them their meat in due season.

=== From Ireland to Scotland and the Macleods ===
In about 1913, Fred T. MacLeod stated that he could find no reference to the cup in the Dunvegan records. He said that Macleod tradition held that the cup came into the possession of the Macleods through the fairies, of which there are one or two legends.

F.T. MacLeod said that it is impossible to determine exactly when the Macleods of Dunvegan acquired the cup, but he thought if likely in the 16th or 17th centuries. During this era several Macleod chiefs took part in warring in Ireland. He thought that the cup may have been a prize of war, or a gift for services. Later, R.C. MacLeod stated that a Lady O'Neill claimed in a 1925 letter, that an O'Neill tradition told how the cup passed to the Macleods. The tradition holds that one of the O'Neill chiefs was a close friend of a Macleod chief. When this O'Neill chief visited his friend at Dunvegan, he took along the cup and gave it to Macleod as a present.

Historically, during the 1590s, a Macleod chief lent support to certain Irish forces rebelling against those supporting Elizabeth I in Ireland. In the summer of 1594, Dòmhnall Gorm Mòr MacDhòmhnaill (chief of the Macdonalds of Sleat) and Ruairidh Mòr MacLeòid (chief of the Macleods of Harris and Dunvegan) both sailed for Ulster at the head of 500 men each. Their force was intended to support Aodh Ruadh Ó Domhnaill who was besieging Enniskillen Castle. After landing at Loch Foyle, the Hebridean chieftains were entertained by Ó Domhnaill for three days and three nights. MacDhòmhnaill returned to the Hebrides and left his men behind in Ireland; however, MacLeòid stayed and was present at the fall of Enniskillen Castle in October 1594. He was still in Ireland the next year at the head of 600 Hebrideans, alongside Ó Domhnaill at the siege of MacCostello's Castle, in County Mayo. In light of Ruairidh Mòr's participation in activities in Ireland at the end of the 16th century, R.C. MacLeod concluded that the cup was given to the Macleods through the O'Neill chieftain Shane Ó Neill; and that these two chieftains were the friends mentioned in the traditional tale related by Lady O'Neill in 1925.

== Traditions ==
In 1927, R.C. MacLeod gave two abridged versions of traditions said to be attributed to the Dunvegan Cup, although he believed that these traditions were un-historical. The traditions are supposed to relate events which took place during the tenure of Malcolm, the third chief of Clan Macleod, who lived about 1296–1370.

In the time of Malcolm, the third Chief, the lands of Luskintyre were possessed by two brothers who were at mortal feud with one another. Their cattle were herded in common, in charge of a man named Lurran Casinreach or swift-footed. This man's mother had nursed one of the brothers — she was considered a witch and lived with her son in a small cottage near her foster-son's house. Lurran folded the cows every night in Buaille Rossinish, where during the harvest season it was customary to have them watched. On the first night of the season it was Lurran's turn to watch, and as the place was considered to be a resort of fairies, Lurran's mother took the precaution to charm all her foster-son's cows, as well as her son Lurran on whom she uttered a spell, proof against the devil himself. About midnight Lurran saw the Bruthach (or mound) open, and an immense concourse of people issue from it. They proceeded towards the fold where they began to converse and examine the cattle. They found the cows of one brother all charmed, but those of the other not so fortunate. Of the latter they immediately killed two of the best and fattest and carried away the carcases, leaving the hides filled with froth and slime, resembling bad carrion. In the morning the two cows were found dead, and conjectured to have been killed by lightning. The same thing however occurred for several nights — the cows of the same brother always being selected. Watch was set but none possessed the power of seeing the fairies, while Lurran kept what he had seen a secret from all but his mother. When it again came to Lurran's turn to watch he saw the same thing happen, but this time he joined the crowd and entered the Bruthach unobserved, and found himself in a spacious hall where was prepared a feast of which all partook. Lurran took care to get a place next the door. After the feast wine was handed round in a beautiful cup, out of which each one drank and then handed it to his neighbour. At last it came to Lurran's turn, who, pitching out the contents, made a dash for the door and escaped, carrying the cup with him, before the company were aware of what he was about. He was hotly pursued but succeeded in reaching his mother's hut, which she immediately charmed so as to prevent the ingress of any spirits, good or bad. Lurran, however, was eventually killed by the fairies for stealing their cup, which his mother then gave to her foster-son, Neil Glundubh. Neil was soon after murdered by his brother, who seized the cup with other property. When the Chief heard of this outrage he had the murderer arrested and put to death at Rowdell. The cup was then taken to Dunvegan, and there it has ever since remained.

— R.C. MacLeod, The Macleods

The second story also mentions the two brothers, but differs in all other details. It relates how the chief held a great banquet at Rowdell in Harris.

... the son of one of these same brothers having been insulted at a feast by Magnus, (the Chief's fifth son) rose from the table to leave the room, muttering threats of vengeance. Magnus sprang up and opposed his exit, on which the offended vassal drew his dirk and stabbed Magnus to the heart. A rush was made by the assembled vassals to seize the murderer, who succeeded in escaping to the top of a rock, which is still shown, where he was brought to bay. He had twelve arrows in his quiver and with each of these he killed one of the Chief's followers. He was then captured and flayed alive; his kindred were outlawed or put to death and all their property confiscated to the Chief who in this way became possessed of the cup.

— R.C. MacLeod, The Macleods

== See also ==
- Fairy Flag, another Macleod heirloom kept at Dunvegan Castle

== Sources ==
- The Archaeological Journal. Vol. 12. London: Archaeological Institute of Great Britain and Ireland. 1855.
- Cambridge Antiquarian Society (1881). Cambridge antiquarian communications. Vol. 4. Macmillan.
- Finlay, Ian (1999). Fothringham, Henry (ed.). Scottish Gold and Silver Work (2nd, illustrated ed.). Edinburgh: Pelican Publishing Company. ISBN 978-1-56554-559-5.
- MacLeod, Fred T. (1912–13). "Notes on the Relics preserved in Dunvegan Castle, Skye, and the Heraldry of the Family of MacLeod of MacLeod" (PDF). Proceedings of the Society of Antiquaries of Scotland. 47.
- MacLeod, Roderick Charles (1906). The Macleods. Edinburgh: Clan Macleod Society. ISBN 0-9500505-4-7.
- MacLeod, Roderick Charles (1927). The Macleods of Dunvegan. Edinburgh: Privately printed for the Clan MacLeod Society.
- Rigby, Stephen Henry (2003). A Companion to Britain in the Later Middle Ages (Illustrated ed.). Wiley-Blackwell. ISBN 978-0-631-21785-5.
- Roberts, John Leonard (1999). Feuds, Forays and Rebellions: History of the Highland Clans, 1475–1625 (illustrated ed.). Edinburgh: Edinburgh University Press. ISBN 0-7486-6244-8.
- Scott, Walter (1857). The Lords of the Isles. Edinburgh: Adam and Charles Black.
- Wilson, Daniel (1851). The Archaeology and Prehistoric Annals of Scotland. Edinburgh: Sutherland and Knox. ISBN 0-665-58472-5.
- Wilson, Daniel (1851–54). "The Dunvegan Cup (exhibited by Daniel Wilson)" (PDF). Proceedings of the Society of Antiquaries of Scotland. 1.
