= Iain Gobha na Hearadh =

Scottish Gaelic poet (1796–1852)

Iain Gobha na Hearadh (1796-1852), known as John Morison in English, was a Bard who composed Christian poetry in Scottish Gaelic.

Gobha na Hearadh was born in Ròghadal on the Isle of Harris. One of his writings was the long poem 'An Nuadh Bhreith, no Gleachd an t-Seann Duine agus an Duin' Òig' ("The New Birth, or the Struggle between the Old Man and the Young.

== Poems ==
- 'An Nuadh Bhreith, no Gleachd an t-Seann Duine agus an Duin' Òig'
- 'An Ionndrainn' ("Longing")
- 'A' Mhisg' ("Drunkenness")
