= Rodel =

Coordinates: 57.738°N 6.964°W

Rodel: Scottish Gaelic: Roghadal
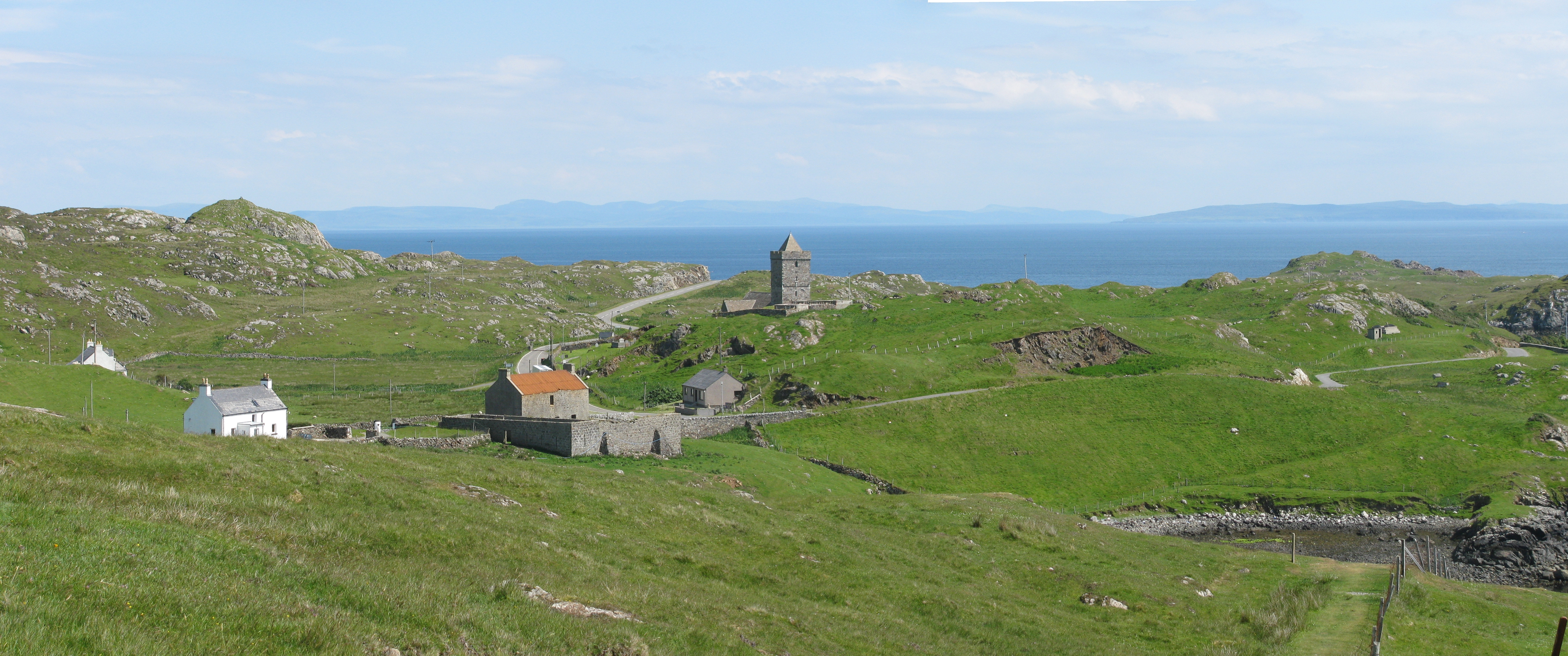
- View of Rodel, with St Clement's church

- Location within the Outer Hebrides
- Language: Scottish Gaelic; English
- OS grid reference: NG046828
- Civil parish: Harris
- Council area: Na h-Eileanan Siar
- Lieutenancy area: Western Isles
- Country: Scotland
- Sovereign state: United Kingdom
- Post town: ISLE OF HARRIS
- Postcode district: HS5
- Dialling code: 01859
- Police: Scotland
- Fire: Scottish
- Ambulance: Scottish
- UK Parliament: Na h-Eileanan an Iar
- Scottish Parliament: Na h-Eileanan an Iar

Rodel (Scottish Gaelic: Roghadal) is a village on the south-eastern coast of Harris, an island in the Scottish Outer Hebrides. Rodel is situated in the parish of Harris. It was historically the capital of Harris, and the main port, before Tarbert took the title.

St Clement's Church (Eaglais Chliamhain) is a 16th-century church which was founded by the 8th Chief of MacLeod and is dedicated to Pope Clement I. The church was built using local Lewisian gneiss rock. It overlooks Loch Rodel. This well-preserved church is currently under the responsibility of Historic Scotland.

Located near the harbour is Rodel Hotel. This was built in 1781 and was originally home to Captain Alexander MacLeod of Berneray who had bought the Isle of Harris in 1779. It was restored in 2001, and then sold to Anderson Bakewell and his wife Francine Stone in 2016.

== Notable people ==
- Iain Gobha na Hearadh (1796-1852) - poet
