= Dunvegan Castle =

Scottish castle

- Caisteal Dhùin Bheagain (Scottish Gaelic)
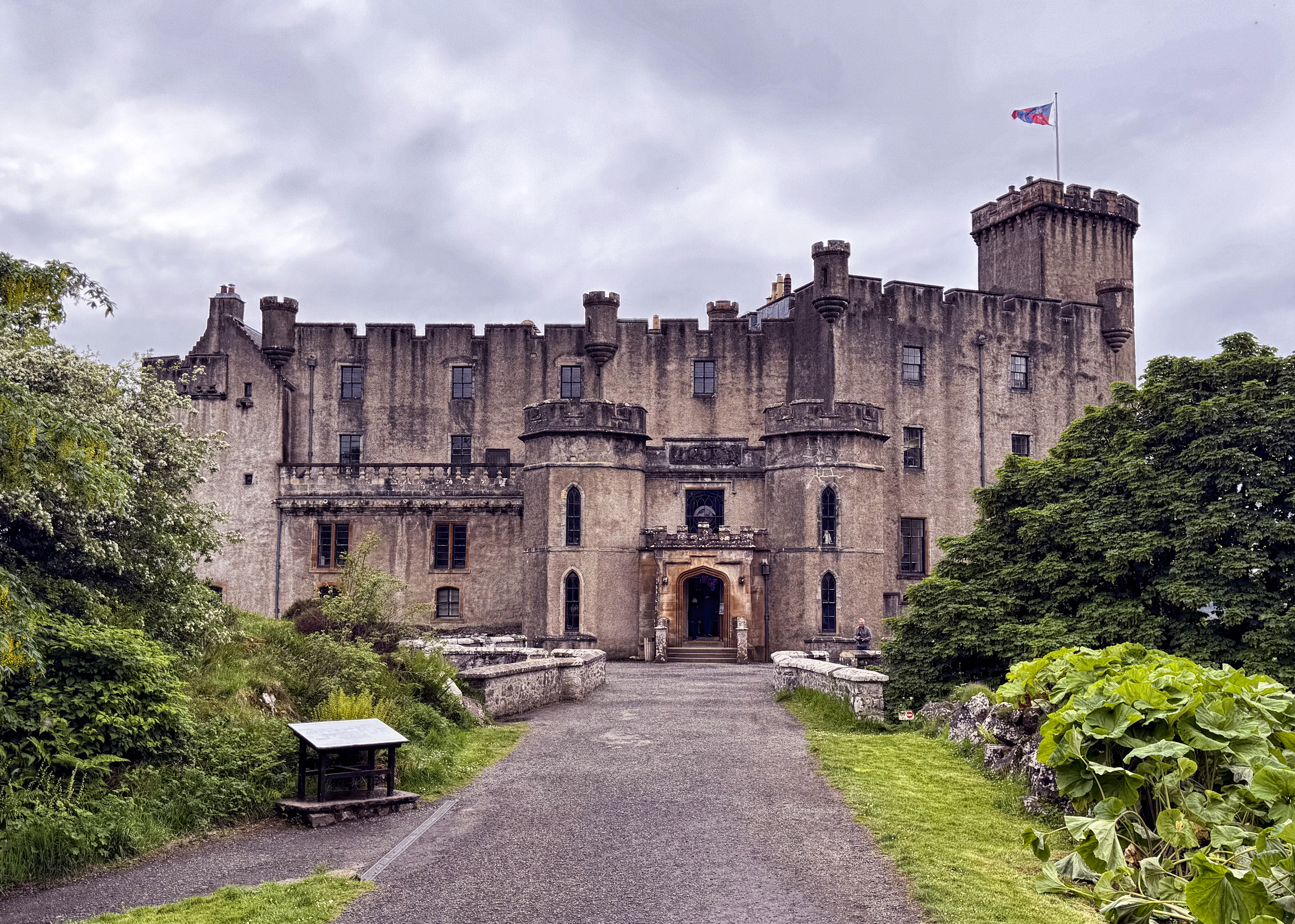
- Dunvegan Castle in 2024

- Location of Dunvegan Castle
- 57.448°N 6.590°W
- Type: Castle
- Associated with: Clan MacLeod
- Location: Scotland
- Part of: Dunvegan

History
- Built: 13th–19th century

Site notes
- Elevation: 15 m (49 ft)
- Architectural styles: Medieval architecture, and Victorian Architecture
- Condition: Occupied as a residence
- Owner: Hugh Magnus MacLeod of MacLeod
- Public access: Historic Houses Association
- Website: http://www.dunvegancastle.com/

Designations
- Designation: Category A listed building

Inventory of Gardens and Designed Landscapes in Scotland
- Official name: Dunvegan Castle
- Designated: 30 June 1987
- Reference no.: GDL00164

Dunvegan Castle (Caisteal Dhùn Bheagain) is located 1 mile (1.6 km) to the north of Dunvegan on the Isle of Skye, off the west coast of Scotland. It is the seat of the MacLeod of MacLeod, chief of the Clan MacLeod. Probably a fortified site from the earliest times, the castle was first built in the 13th century and developed piecemeal over the centuries. In the 19th century the whole castle was remodelled in a mock-medieval style. The castle is built on an elevated rock overlooking an inlet on the eastern shore of Loch Dunvegan, a sea loch.

== History ==
The promontory was enclosed by a curtain wall in the 13th century, and a four-storey tower house was built in the late 14th century. This tower was similar in style to contemporary structures at Kisimul Castle and Caisteal Maol. Alasdair Crotach, the 8th chief, added the Fairy Tower as a separate building around 1500. During the 17th century, new ranges of buildings were put up between the old tower and the Fairy Tower, beginning in 1623 with the state apartment built by Ruairidh Mòr. The old tower was subsequently abandoned until the late 18th century, when the 23rd chief began the process of homogenising the appearance of the castle. This process continued under the 24th and 25th chiefs, with the addition of mock battlements and the new approach over a drawbridge from the east. The present appearance of the castle dates from around 1840 when this process of "baronialisation" was completed. The castle is a Category A listed building.

== Site ==
Dunvegan Castle occupies the summit of a rock some 50 feet (15 m) above sea level, which projects on to the eastern shore of a north-facing inlet or bay. On the eastern, landward side of the site is a partly natural ditch around 18 feet (5.5 m) deep.

== Artifacts ==
Notable family heirlooms kept at Dunvegan Castle include:

- Dunvegan Cup
- Fairy Flag
- Sir Rory Mor's Horn

== Images ==
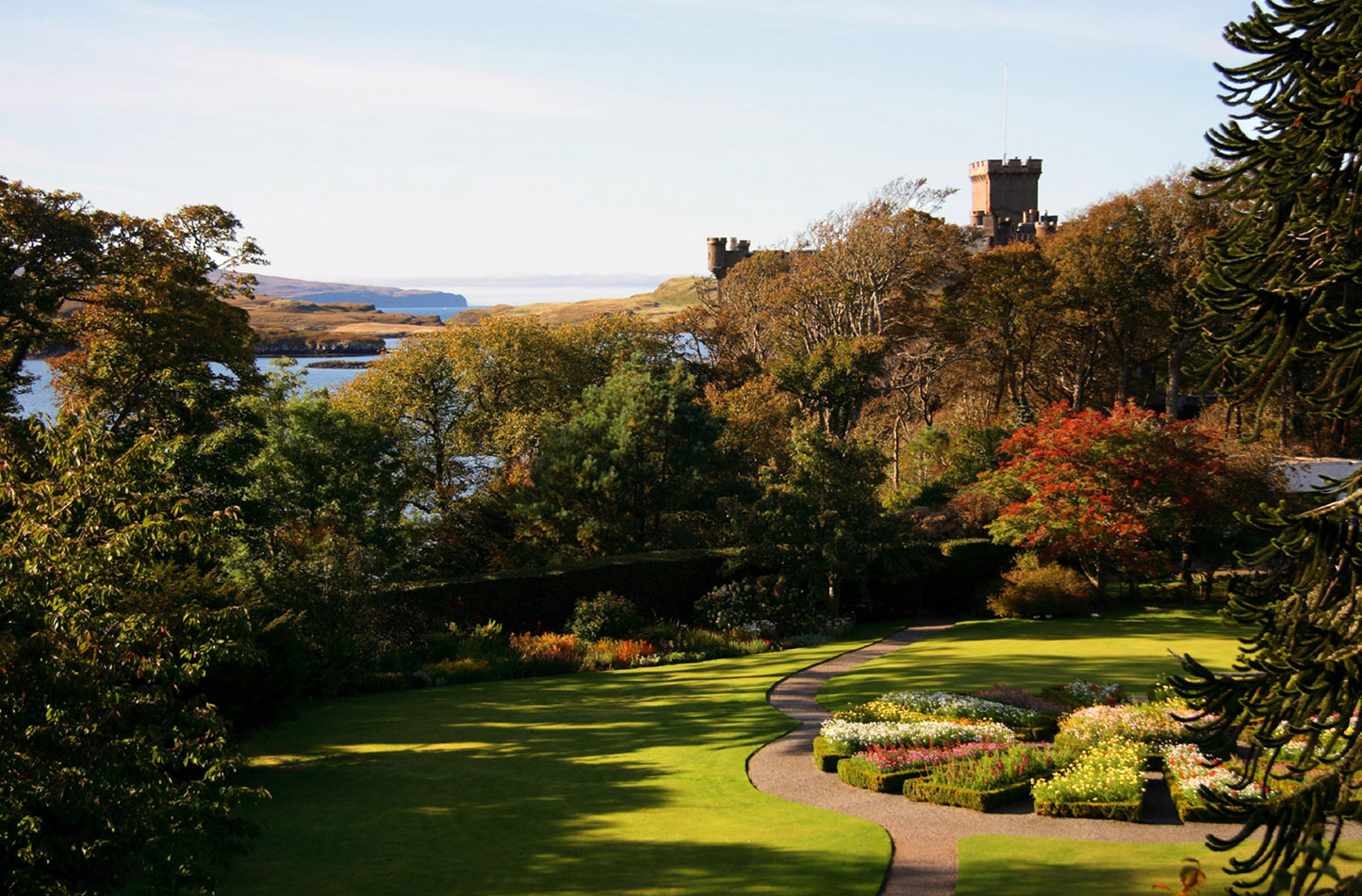
Round Garden, Dunvegan Castle

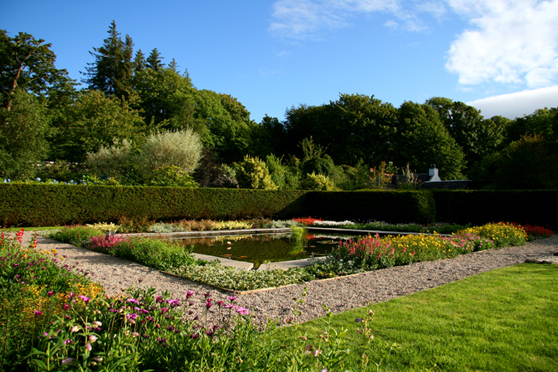
The Walled Garden, Dunvegan Castle

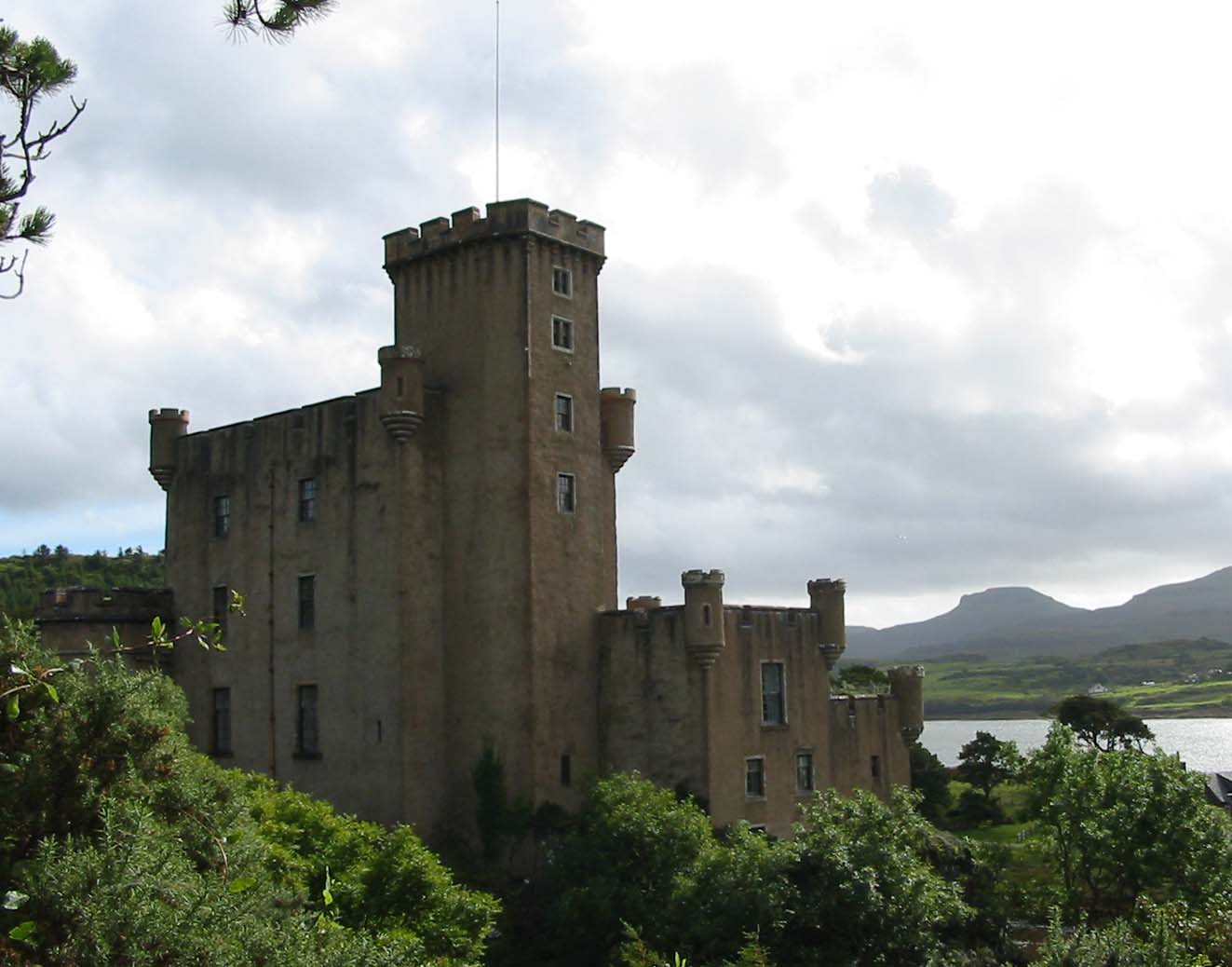
Dunvegan Castle

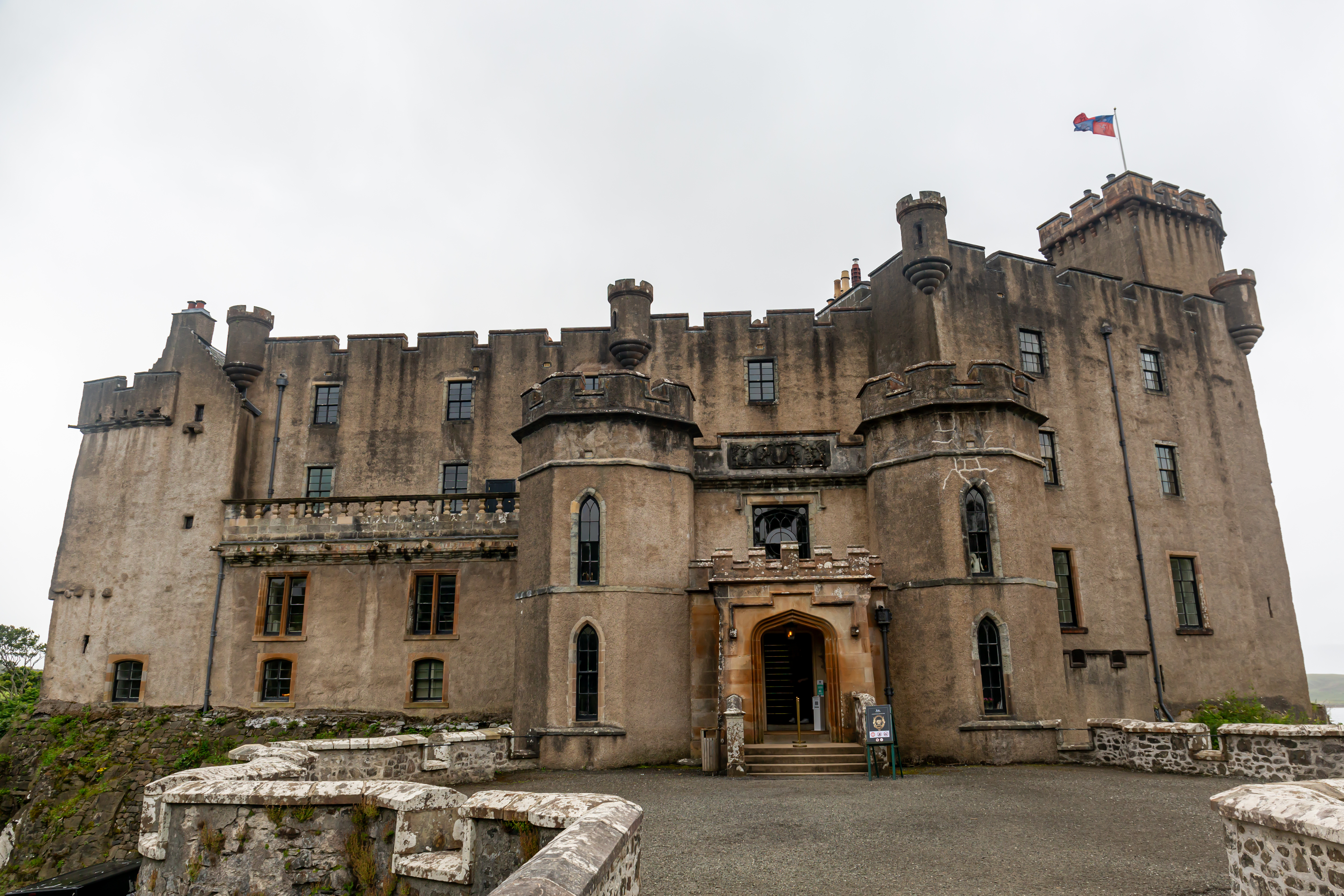
Dunvegan Castle entrance

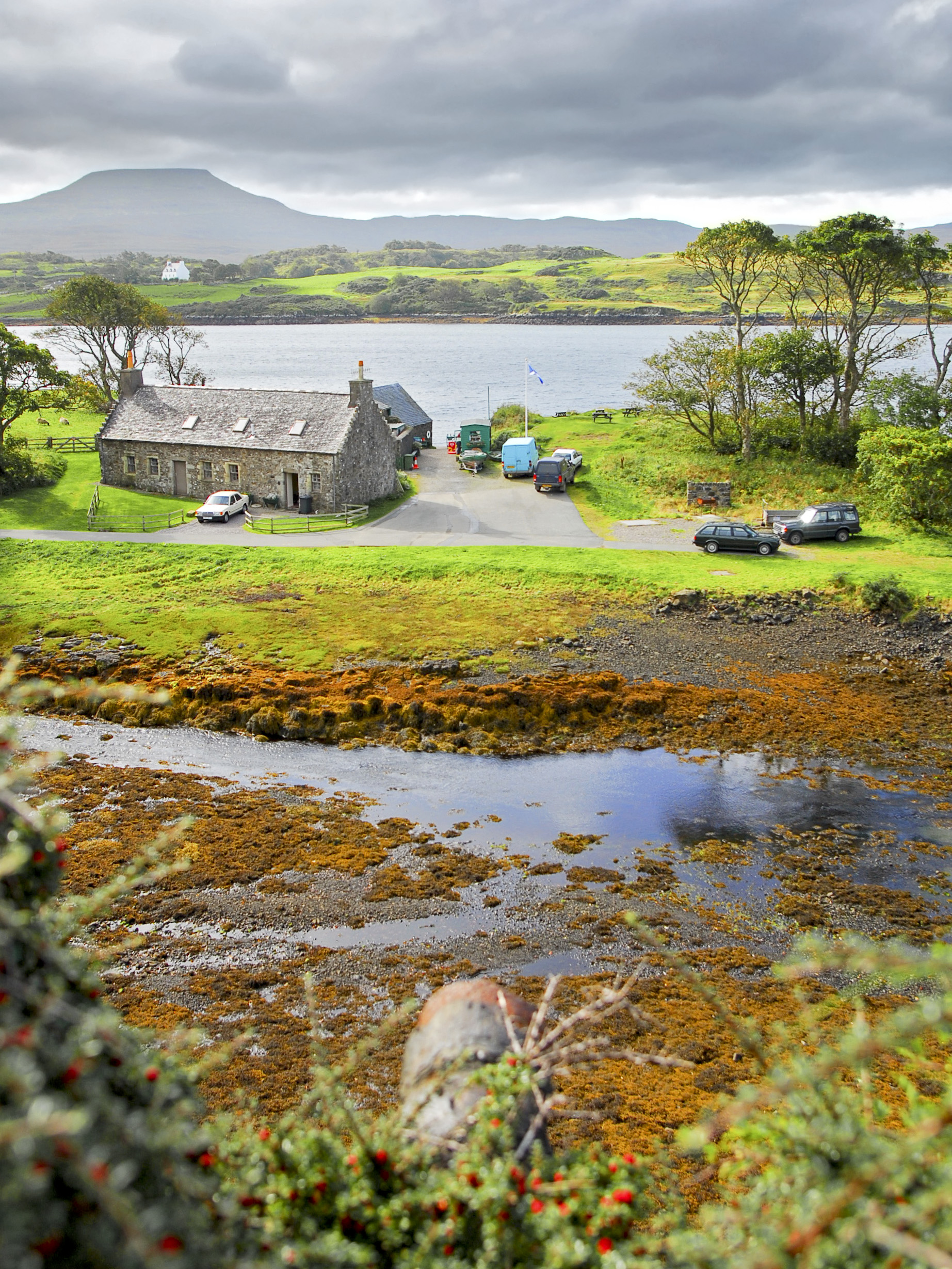
Dunvegan Castle port

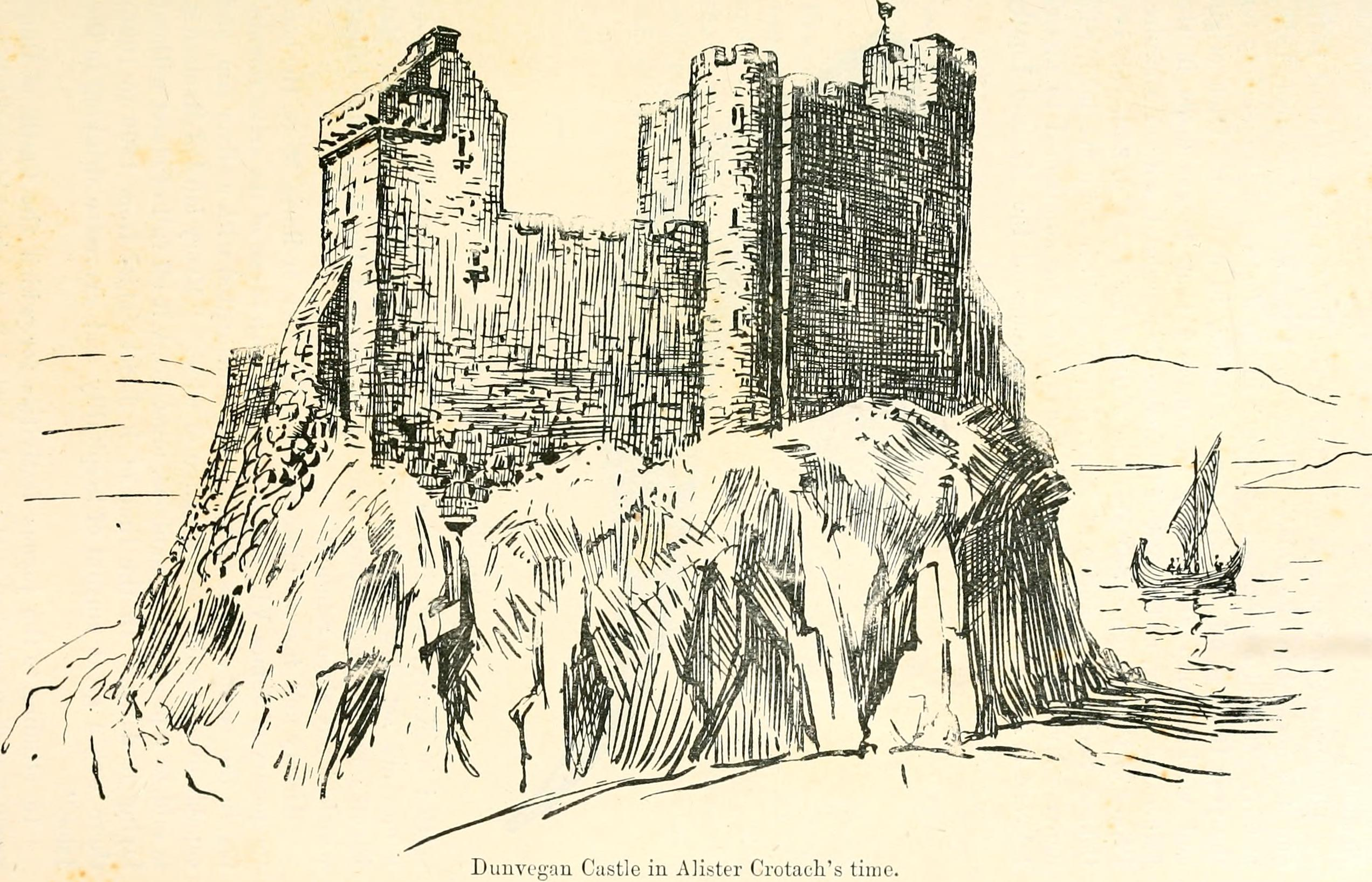
Artist's impression of the castle c. 1500

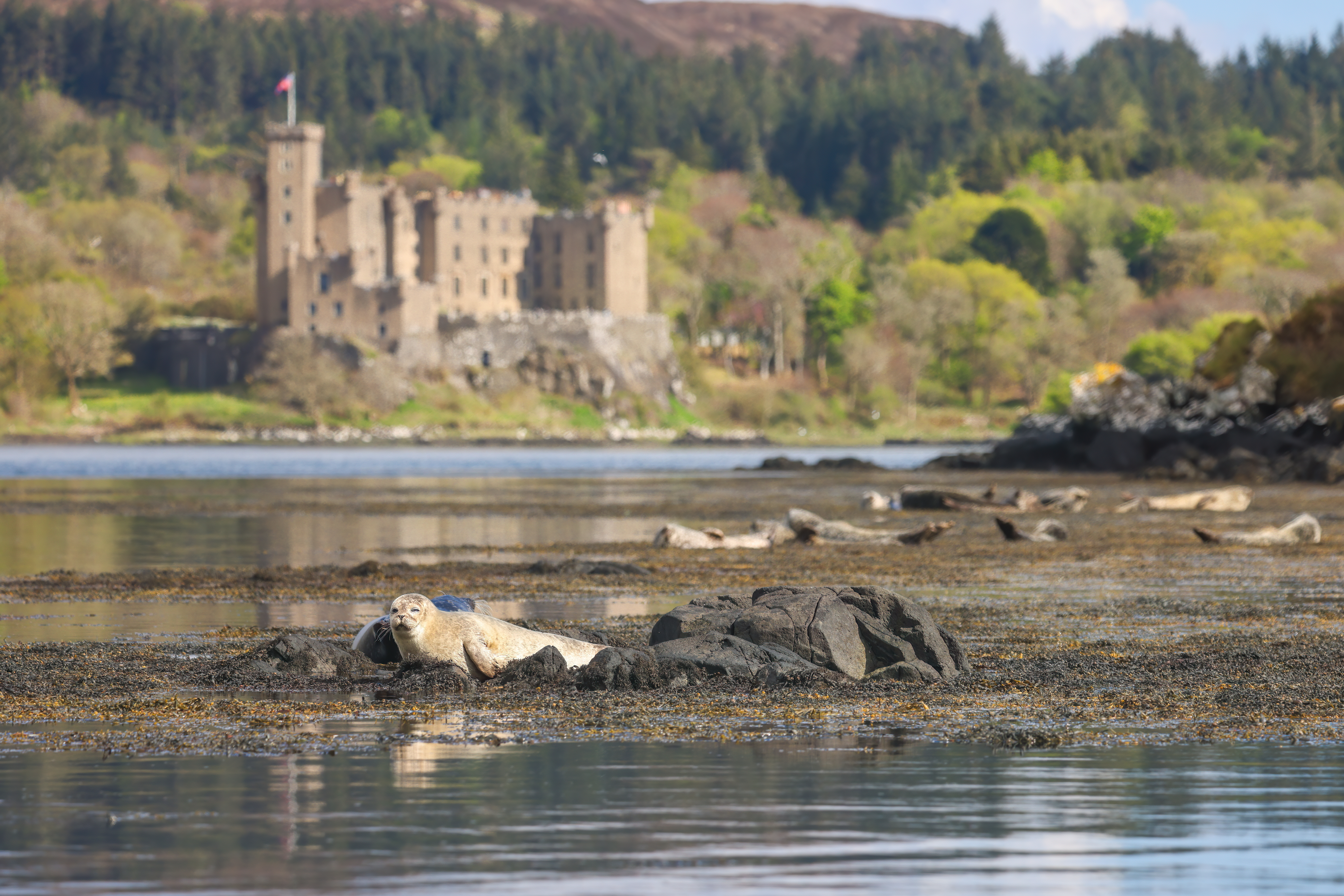
Seals in front of the castle

== Literature ==
The Mystery at Dunvegan Castle a novel by T.L. Huchu is set at Dunvegan Castle and the Fairy Flag features in the plot.

The Adept, a contemporary fantasy novel by Katherine Kurtz, features the Fairy Flag being stolen by members of an evil magical lodge.
