= Heirloom =

Item passed down within a family

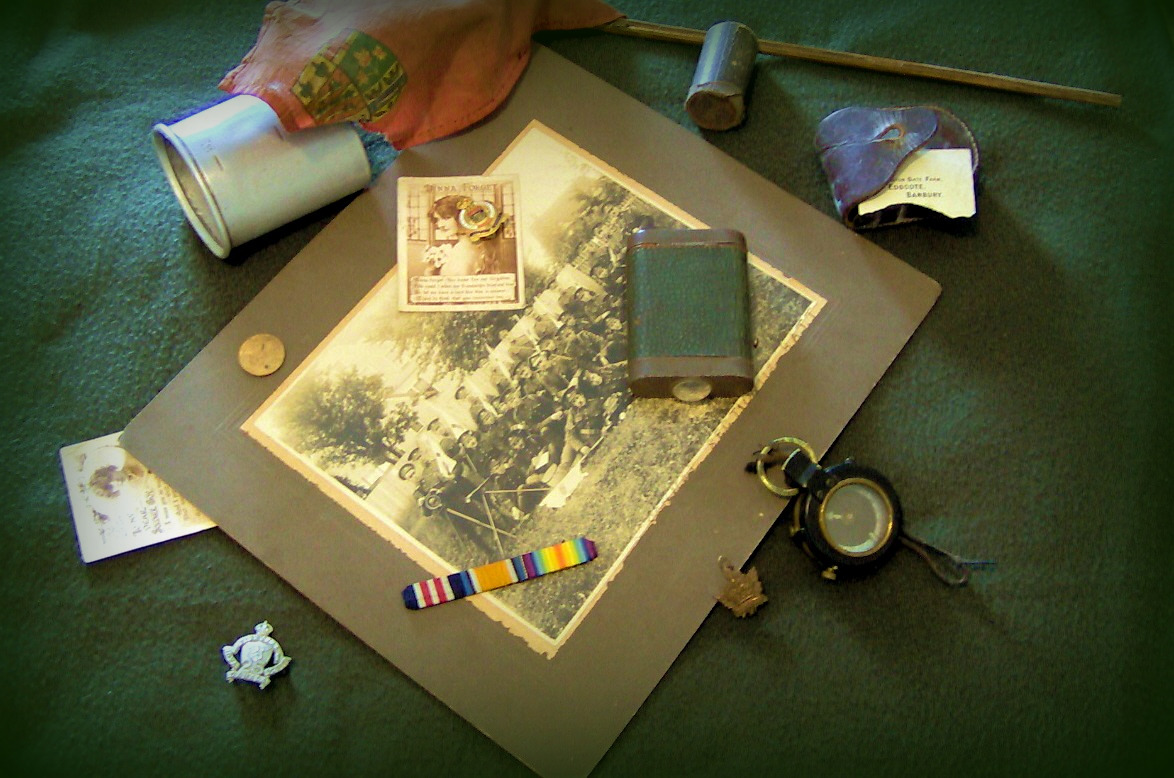
Mementoes from a soldier's war service may become valued family heirlooms

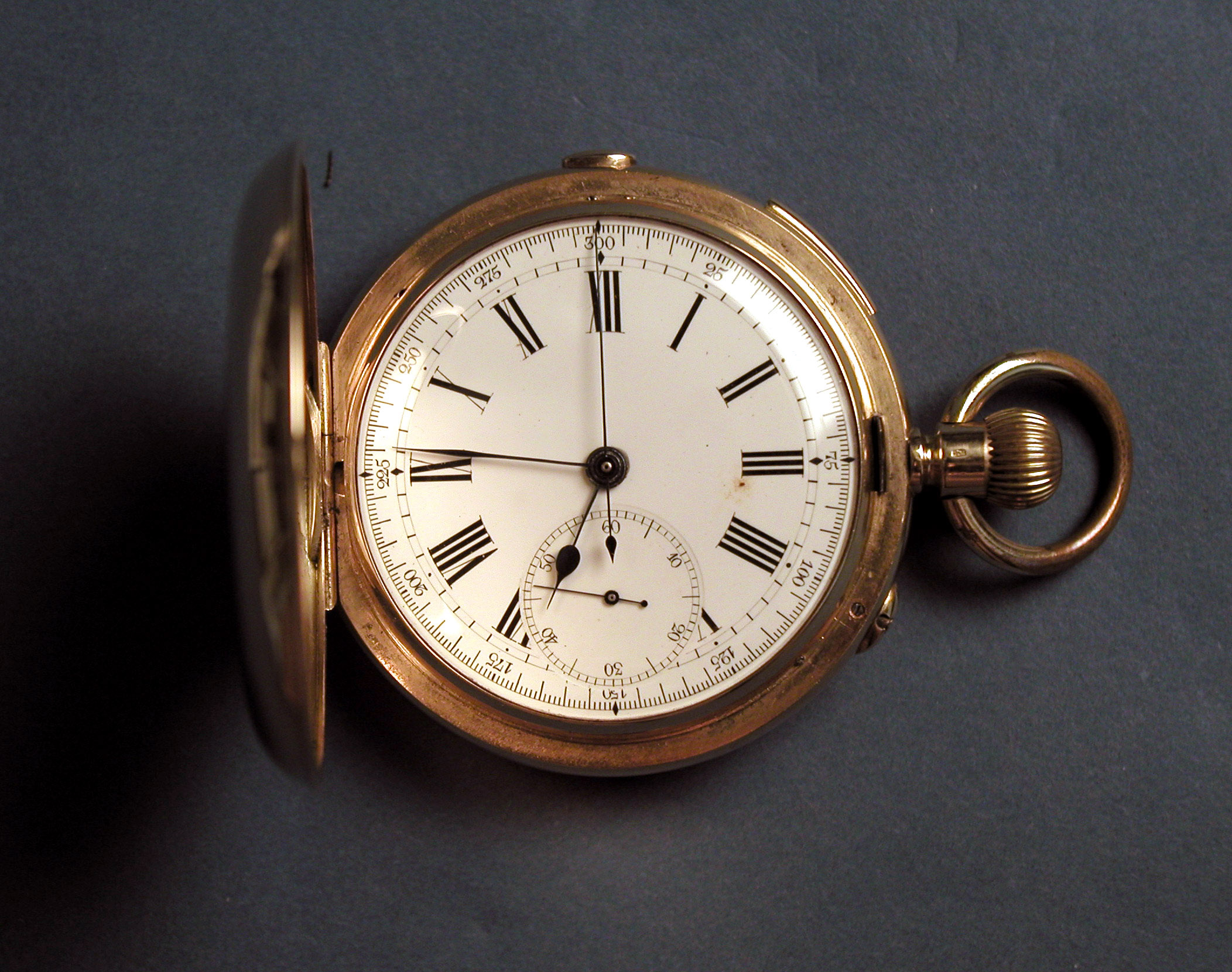
Heirloom 1893 pocket watch with 18 carat gold case

In popular usage, an heirloom is something that has been passed down for generations through family members. Examples are a family Bible, antiques, weapons or jewellery.

The term originated with the historical principle of an heirloom in English law, a chattel which by immemorial usage was regarded as annexed by inheritance to a family estate. Loom originally meant a tool. Such genuine heirlooms were almost unknown by the beginning of the twentieth century.

== English legal history ==
In the English legal system, any owner of a genuine heirloom could dispose of it during his lifetime, but he could not bequeath it by will away from the estate. If the owner died intestate, it went to his heir-at-law, and if he devised the estate it went to the devisee. The word subsequently acquired a secondary meaning, applied to furniture, pictures, etc., vested in trustees to hold on trust for the person for the time being entitled to the possession of a settled house. Such things were more properly called settled chattels. As of 1 January 1997, no further settled land can be created and the remaining pre-existing settlements have a declining importance in English law.

An heirloom in the strict sense was made by family custom, not by settlement. A settled chattel could be sold under the direction of the court, and the money arising under such sale is capital money. The court would only sanction such a sale, if it could be shown that it was to the benefit of all parties concerned and if the article proposed to be sold was of unique or historical character. The court had regard to the intention of the settlor and the wishes of the remainder men.

== Southeast Asia ==
Pusaka is a Sanskrit word meaning heirloom. Within Javanese Kejawen culture and other Austronesian cultures affected by it, known as the Malays, but most specifically the inhabitants of modern-day Indonesia and Malaysia (Minangs), Balinese, Bataks, Bugis, Manado, Minang, Moro, Pampangan, Tagalog and many others, pusaka specifically refers to family heirlooms inherited from ancestors, which must be treasured and protected. These pusaka may have individual names, honorific titles and may have supernatural attributes and qualities. The possessor of the pusaka may be positively or negatively affected by the pusaka, depending on the will or spirit of the item.

The Javanese warrior-king Pangeran Sambernyawa's keris was a pusaka so powerful that merely pointing at the distant Chinese, Dutch or other enemies, it would snatch their souls and leave them dead on the battlefield. Allegedly, former Indonesian President Suharto held possession of this powerful pusaka and had Indonesia scoured for the many pusaka lost to time, including, according to rumours, the mask of Gadjah Mada, several tombak (pikes and lances) and many keris, to affirm his legitimacy as a modern pseudo-king.

== In literature ==
The plot of the Anthony Trollope novel The Eustace Diamonds hinges on the heirloomic status (or not) of a diamond necklace.

== See also ==
- Keepsake
