= MacLeod =

- Pronunciation: /məˈklaʊd/ mə-KLOWD
- Gender: Unisex

Origin
- Languages: 1. Scottish Gaelic; 2. English; 3. Old Norse
- Origin: 1. MacLeòid

Other names
- Variant forms: Macleod, McLeod, M‘Leod, MacLot, McCloud, MacCleod, McCleod

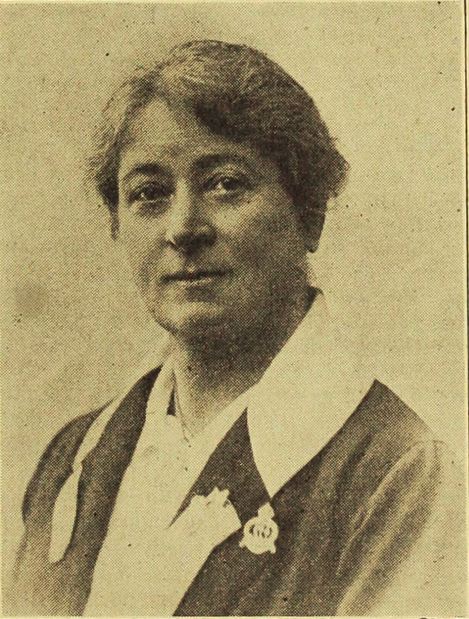
Mrs MacLeod was president of the Australasian WCTU in 1922

MacLeod, McLeod and Macleod (/məˈklaʊd/ mə-KLOWD) are surnames in the English language. The names are anglicised forms of the Scottish Gaelic MacLeòid, meaning "son of Leòd", derived from the Old Norse Liótr.

One of the earliest occurrences of the surname is of Gillandres MacLeod, in 1227. There are two recognised Scottish clans with the surname: Clan MacLeod of Harris and Skye, and Clan MacLeod of Lewis and Raasay. The earliest record of these two families, using a form of the surname MacLeod, occurs in the mid 14th century.

There are also documented cases of Scottish missionaries in Canada using McLeod as an Anglicisation of the indigenous Cree language name Mahkiyoc (meaning "the big one"), which accounts for its occurrence amongst Canadian people of Cree heritage.

== People with the surname MacLeod, McLeod, Macleod ==
- A. A. MacLeod (1902–1970), Canadian politician from Ontario
- Anna MacGillivray Macleod (1917–2004), Scottish Professor of Brewing and Biochemistry
- Aileen McLeod (born 1971), Scottish National Party MSP
- Alan Arnett McLeod (1899–1918), Canadian recipient of the Victoria Cross
- Alexander McLeod (1796–1871), Scottish-Canadian sheriff acquitted of murder charges in connection to the Caroline Affair
- Alexander Samuel MacLeod (1888–1956), Canadian artist
- Alistair MacLeod (1936–2014), Canadian author
- Ally MacLeod (1931–2004), Scottish football player, manager, and manager of Scotland team
- Ally McLeod (born 1951), Scottish football player
- Andrew MacLeod (born 1966) Humanitarian Expert and CEO
- Andrew McLeod (born 1976) Australian Rules footballer
- Angus MacLeod (disambiguation)
- Angus McLeod (disambiguation)
- Bryan McLeod (born 1974), Canadian politician from Manitoba
- Cathy McLeod (born 1957), Canadian politician
- Charlotte MacLeod (1922–2005), Canadian mystery fiction writer
- Clarence J. McLeod (1895–1959)
- Cody McLeod (born 1984), Canadian professional ice hockey player
- Colin Munro MacLeod (1909–1972), Canadian-American geneticist
- Cooper McLeod (born 2001), American speedskater
- Cynthia McLeod (born 1936), Surinamese novelist
- Dave MacLeod (born 1978), Scottish rock climber
- David McLeod (born 1971), American football player
- Debbie McLeod (born 1972), Scottish field hockey goalkeeper
- Della Campbell MacLeod (ca. 1884 – ?), American author and journalist
- Donald Bannerman Macleod (1887–1972), New Zealand physicist
- Donald Friell McLeod (1810–1872), British Lieutenant-Governor of Punjab
- Donald Kenneth McLeod (1885–1958), British Army officer with the British Indian Army
- Donald Macleod (theologian) (1940–2023), Scottish theologian
- Duncan Lloyd McLeod (1874–1935), Canadian politician from Manitoba
- Duncan Stuart McLeod (1854–1933), Canadian politician from Manitoba
- Eddie McLeod (cricketer) (1900–1989), New Zealand cricketer
- Eddie McLeod (footballer) (fl 1930s), Scottish footballer
- Erin McLeod (born 1983), Canadian soccer player
- Fred McLeod (golfer) (1882–1976), Scottish-American golfer
- G. Scott MacLeod (born 1965), Canadian multimedia artist and film director
- Gavin MacLeod (1930–2021), American actor
- George MacLeod (1895–1991), Scottish churchman, founder of the Iona Community
- Georgie A. Hulse McLeod (1835–1890), author, educator, temperance activist
- Greg MacLeod (1935–2017), Canadian priest and educator
- Henry Dunning Macleod (1821–1902), Scottish economist
- Henry Wallace McLeod (1915–1944), Canadian fighter pilot
- Herbert McLeod (1841–1923), English chemist
- Hugh McLeod (footballer) (1907–1929), Scottish footballer
- Hugh McLeod (politician) (1843–1879), Canadian lawyer
- Hugh McLeod (rugby union) (1932–2014), Scottish rugby player
- Iain MacLeod (disambiguation), several people
  - Iain Borb MacLeod (1392–1442), Scottish clan chief
  - Iain Ciar MacLeod (1330–c. 1392), Scottish clan chief
  - Iain Norman Macleod (1913–1970), British politician
- Ian R. MacLeod (born 1956), British science fiction and fantasy author
- Izale McLeod (born 1984), British footballer
- Jalen McLeod (born 2002), American football player
- James Macleod (1836–1894), Scottish-Canadian pioneer and RCMP commissioner
- Jeanette McLeod New Zealand mathematician
- Jenny McLeod (1941–2022) New Zealand composer
- Jess McLeod (1997– ) Canadian actor
- Jim McLeod (baseball) (1908–1981), third baseman for Washington Senators
- Jimmy McLeod (1937–2019), Canadian ice hockey goaltender
- Joan MacLeod (born 1954), Canadian playwright
- John MacLeod (basketball) (1937–2019), American basketball coach
- John McLeod (footballer, born 1888)
- John Macleod (physiologist) (1876–1935), Scottish biochemist and co-discoverer of insulin
- John George Macleod (1915–2006), Scottish Physician and writer of medical books
- Joseph Macleod (1903–1984), British poet, actor, playwright, theatre director and BBC newsreader
- Julius Mac Leod (1857–1919), Belgian biologist, professor at the University of Ghent
- Kam McLeod (died 2019), Canadian fugitive of 2019 Northern British Columbia murders
- Karen MacLeod (1958–2021), British long-distance runner
- Keith McLeod (born 1979), American basketball player
- Ken MacLeod (born 1954), Scottish science fiction writer
- Ken McLeod (born 1948), American Buddhist teacher, writer, translator
- Kevin MacLeod (born 1972), American composer
- Kevin S. MacLeod (born 1951), Canadian Secretary to Queen Elizabeth
- Kiel McLeod (born 1982), Canadian ice hockey player
- Kirstie Macleod, British artist
- Lyn McLeod (born 1942), Canadian politician from Ontario
- Malcolm MacLeod (disambiguation), several people
  - Malcolm MacLeod (clan chief) (1296–1370), Scottish clan chief
  - Malcolm MacLeod (scientist) (1882–1969), British scientist
  - Malcolm MacLeod (politician), politician from New Brunswick, Canada
  - Malcolm Macleod, former Rector of the University of Edinburgh
- Margaret McLeod (died 1993)
- Marilyn McLeod (1939–2021), American songwriter and singer
- Martin McLeod (1813–1860), American pioneer, trader, and territorial legislator
- Mary MacLeod Trump, Scottish-American philanthropist, mother of Donald Trump
- Mary MacLeod (actress) (1937–2016), Scottish actress of the theatre, film and television
- Mary McLeod Bethune (1875–1955), American educator
- Màiri nighean Alasdair Ruaidh (c.1615 – c.1707), also known as Mary Macleod
- Mata Hari, stage name for Margaretha Geertruida MacLeod (1876–1917), executed by France as a German spy in 1917
- Moira MacLeod (born 1957), British field hockey player
- Michael McLeod (disambiguation), several people
  - Michael McLeod (ice hockey) (born 1998), Canadian ice hockey player
  - Michael McLeod (politician) (born 1959), Canadian politician
  - Mike McLeod (athlete) (born 1952), British runner
  - Mike McLeod (gridiron football) (born 1958), American football player
  - Mike McLeod (actor) (born 1985), Canadian film and television actor
  - Michael McLeod (journalist), American journalist who has written about Bigfoot
  - Michael McLeod (musician), Australian bassist and clean vocalist
- Murdo MacLeod (born 1958), Scottish footballer
- Nathanel William Hamish Macleod (born 1940), British Financial Secretary of Hong Kong 1991–1995
- Neil McLeod (field hockey) (born 1952), New Zealand field hockey player
- Neil McLeod (politician) (1842–1915), Canadian politician from Prince Edward Island
- Nicholas McLeod (fl. 1868–1889), Scottish businessman and missionary
- Norman MacLeod (disambiguation), several people:
  - Norm MacLeod (1904–1951), an Australian rules footballer
  - Norman Macleod, known as Piper Norman (1953– ), Scottish musician
  - Norman MacLeod (Canadian businessman), president of the Liberal Party of Canada
  - Norman Macleod (Caraid nan Gaidheal) (1783–1862), Scottish churchman and writer
  - Norman MacLeod (1812–1872), Scottish churchman and writer, his son
  - Norman Macleod (journalist) (born about 1967), Scottish television presenter
  - Norman MacLeod of MacLeod (1812–1895), 25th chief of Clan MacLeod
- Norman Z. McLeod (1898–1964), film director
- Omar McLeod (born 1994), Jamaican hurdler
- Peden McLeod (1940–2021), American lawyer and politician
- Prudence MacLeod (born 1958), philanthropist, daughter of media mogul Rupert Murdoch
- Sir Reginald MacLeod of MacLeod, 27th chief of Clan MacLeod
- Robin McLeod (1951–2024), Canadian surgeon and medical researcher
- Roderick Macleod (disambiguation), several people:
  - Roderick Macleod (Alberta politician) (1908–2004), Canadian politician
  - Sir Roderick Macleod of Macleod, 15th chief of Clan MacLeod
- Rodney McLeod (born 1990), American football player
- Rory McLeod (singer-songwriter) (born 1957), British folk singer-songwriter
- Rory McLeod (snooker player) (born 1971), English professional snooker player
- Roshown McLeod (born 1975), American basketball player
- Ryan McLeod (born 1999), Canadian ice hockey player
- Sarah McLeod (born 1971), New Zealand actress
- Sarah McLeod (musician) (born 1973), Australian singer of The Superjesus
- Scott MacLeod (disambiguation), several people
  - R. W. Scott McLeod (1914–1961), U.S. Department of State official
  - Scott MacLeod (ice hockey) (born 1959), Canadian ice hockey player
  - Scott MacLeod (rugby union) (born 1979), Scottish rugby union footballer
  - G. Scott MacLeod (born 1965), Canadian multimedia artist and film director
- Shane McLeod (journalist) (born 1975), Australian news correspondent
- Sheila MacLeod (born 1939), Scottish author and feminist
- Stuart Macleod (magician) (born 1982), Scottish magician
- Stuart MacLeod (musician), Australian guitarist in Eskimo Joe
- Sian MacLeod (born 1962), British ambassador
- Tammy McLeod (born 1977), Canadian boccia player
- Torquil MacLeod (fl. 14th century), Scottish clan chief
- William MacLeod (disambiguation), several people:
  - William Cleireach MacLeod (1365–c. 1402), Scottish clan chief
  - William Dubh MacLeod (c. 1415–1480), Scottish clan chief

== People with the given name Macleod, McLeod, MacLeod ==
- McLeod Bethel-Thompson (born 1988), American football player
- Norman Macleod Ferrers (1829–1903), British mathematician and university administrator
- Norman MacLeod Lang (1875–1956), Bishop of Leicester

== Fictional characters with the surnames MacLeod or McLeod ==
- Claire McLeod, from Australian Television Show McLeod's Daughters
- Colin MacLeod, from Highlander: Vengeance the animated film
- Connor MacLeod, from the Highlander films and television series
- Duncan MacLeod, from the Highlander films and television series
- Fergus MacLeod, the real name of Crowley, from the television show Supernatural
- Jodi Fountain McLeod, from Australian Television Show McLeod's Daughters
- Justin McLeod, from the film The Man Without a Face
- Owen MacLeod, from Highlander the game
- Quentin MacLeod, from Highlander the animated series
- Rowena MacLeod, Crowley's mother, from the television show Supernatural
- Sarah MacLeod, from Highlander: The Animated Series
- Tess Silverman McLeod Ryan, from Australian television show McLeod's Daughters

== See also ==
- McCloud (surname)
