= William MacLeod =

William MacLeod or William Macleod may refer to:

- William Cleireach MacLeod (1365–?c. 1402), Scottish clan chief
- William Dubh MacLeod (c. 1415–1480 – 80), Scottish clan chief
- William MacKintosh MacLeod (1861–1931), Scottish international rugby union player
- William Macleod (1850–1929), Australian artist
- William MacLeod (priest) (1867–1932), Anglican Provost of Wakefield Cathedral
- William A. MacLeod (1883–1961), Canadian physician and politician
- W. Bentley MacLeod (born 1954), Canadian-American economist
- William Douglas Macleod (born 1892), Scottish artist and etcher

== See also ==
- William McLeod (disambiguation)
- MacLeod, a surname
