= Troughton & Simms =

British producer of scientific instruments

- Industry: Manufacturing
- Founded: 1826
- Founders: Edward Troughton and William Simms
- Headquarters: London, UK
- Products: Scientific instruments

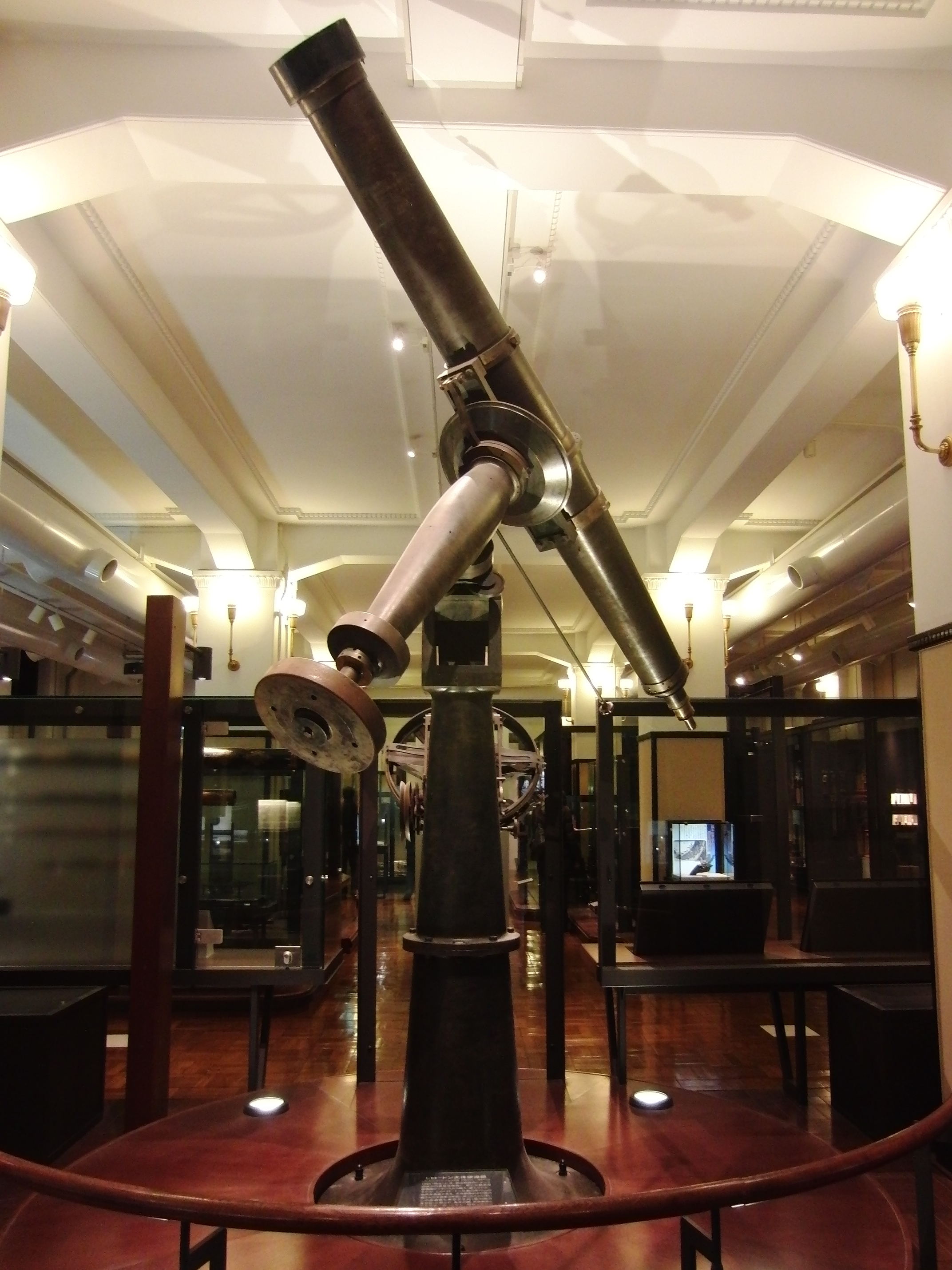
Troughton & Simms astronomical telescope at the National Museum of Nature and Science, Tokyo, Japan.

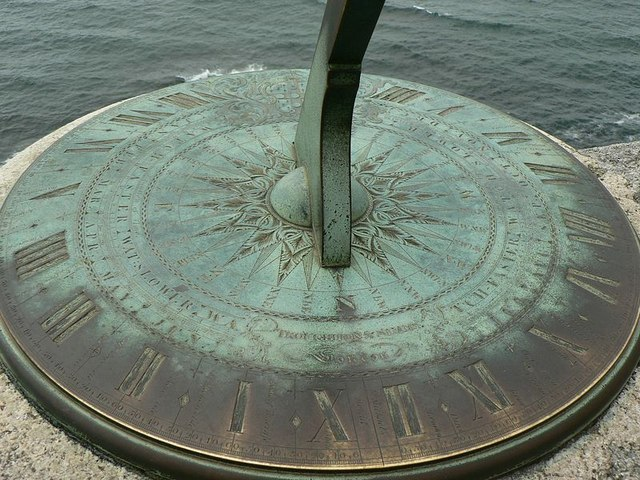
Troughton & Simms, sundial at St Michael's Mount

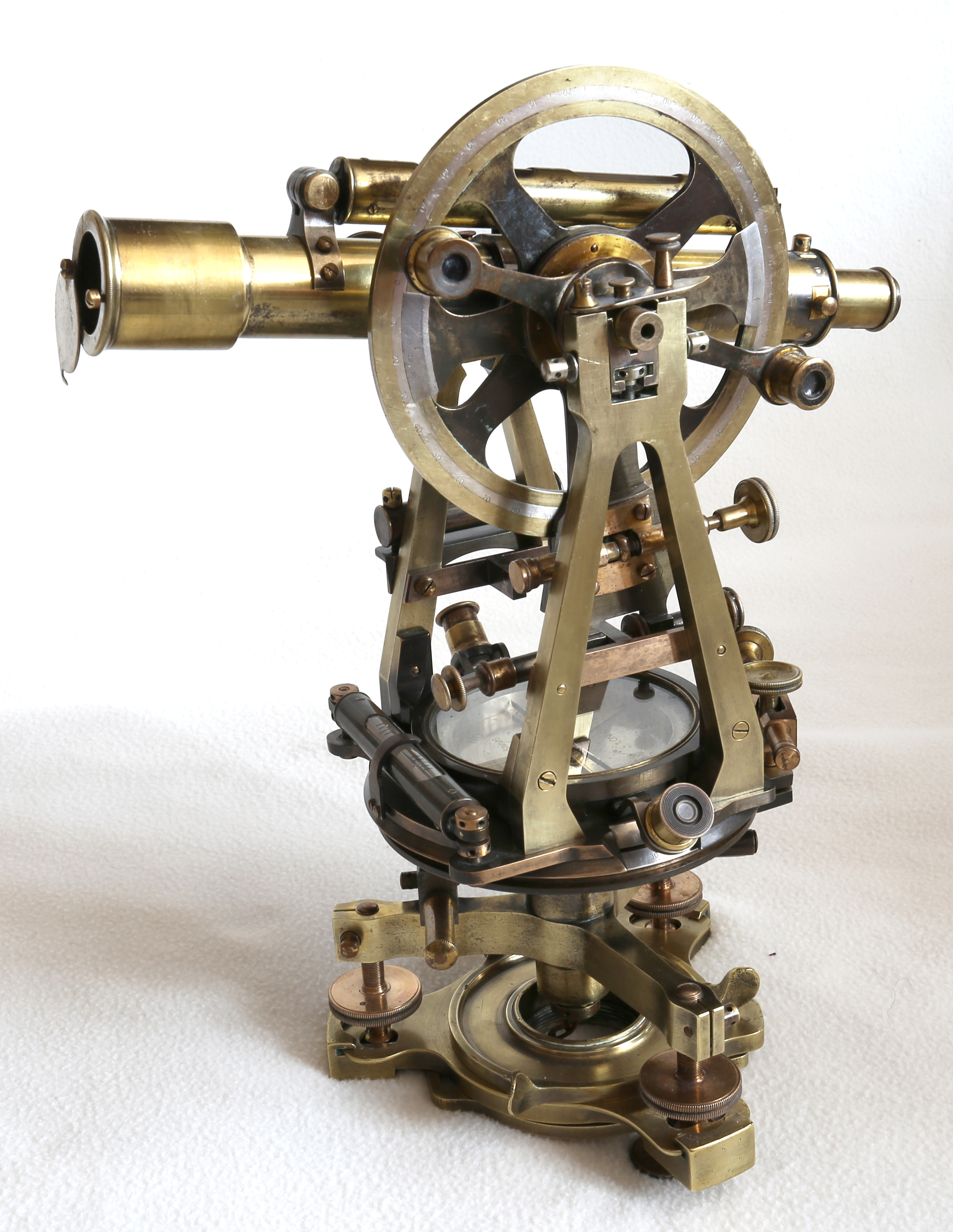
Troughton & Simms theodolite for surveyors and engineers

Troughton & Simms surveyors level

Troughton & Simms was a British scientific instrument firm. It was formed when Edward Troughton in his old age took on William Simms as a partner in 1826. It became a limited company in 1915 and in 1922 it merged with T. Cooke & Sons to form Cooke, Troughton & Simms.

The firm had its origins in the instrument-making business begun in 1764 by John Troughton (1716-1788). This business was successively passed down first to nephews, John Troughton (1739-1807) and then to Edward Troughton (1756-1835). In 1826 Edward Troughton took on William Simms as partner.

== Origins ==
In 1756, John Troughton Senior from Corney, Cumberland, set up business in London, having completed his apprenticeship with London instrument maker Thomas Heath.

In 1769, his nephew John Troughton Junior, after completing his apprenticeship with his uncle, set up in business for himself. He took over the business of Benjamin Cole in 1782, a maker of orreries at a shop in Fleet Street called "At the Sign of The Orrery". His work at that time was mostly providing a service to other craftsmen in the difficult skill of dividing circles by hand for navigation, surveying and astronomical instruments. In 1789, he took his brother Edward Troughton into partnership.

The Board of Longitude was wound up in 1828, but the Board of Ordnance (now Ordnance Survey) started work on the Triangulation of Britain in 1791. This was reflected in the change in Troughton's work away from astronomical and navigational towards terrestrial surveying.

William Simms completed his goldsmithing apprenticeship in 1815 and set up business as a maker of marine compasses. In about 1825, he was asked to repair and re-divide an astronomical circle made by Troughton. Having completed this work, he wrote a paper for Edward Troughton describing his new method of dividing which was more accurate than an engine and quicker than using a roller. Edward Troughton took on William Simms as a partner in 1826.

Notable Troughton instruments from this period include the Equatorial telescope at Armagh Observatory (1795), the Mural circle at Greenwich Royal Observatory (1812), and the Transit telescope at Greenwich Royal Observatory (1816).

== Troughton & Simms during the Industrial Revolution ==
In 1828, George Everest returned from India and asked Simms to repair instruments used for the Survey of India. To try to make his theodolites less susceptible to field conditions Everest proposed a new pattern with a lower centre of gravity.

In 1834, the Houses of Parliament burned down so a new set of national standards of length were commissioned. In 1835 George Airy became Astronomer Royal and commissioned new instruments. Large castings were contracted to Maudslay and Ransomes. Optical parts were often supplied by Dollond.

From about 1830 to 1850 Britain was gripped by Railway Mania resulting in high demand for levels and theodolites. Troughton & Simms exhibited at the Great Exhibition in 1851.

William Simms died in 1860 and the firm took William Simms Junior and his cousin James into partnership. Optical glass technology allowed larger lenses to be made and these were sourced from French and German makers such as Guinand and Merz.

In 1866, a transit and spectroscope were ordered by Harvard College Observatory and delivered in 1870. Slow delivery appears to have happened a lot and seems to have been partly due to insistence on precision but also the volume of business being undertaken.

In 1860, Troughton & Simms opened a new works at Charlton. There were many requests from around the world for standard measure bars, and in 1876, they supplied the Imperial Standards Of Length gauges mounted at Trafalgar Square and the Greenwich Royal Observatory.

The firm produced hundreds of astronomical instruments such as mural circles, transit circles, sextants, and other astronomical instruments for observatories around the world. Towards the end of this period other countries such as France, Germany and the United States were able to make instruments themselves so Troughton & Simms made more of their product for the British market.

Notable instruments from this period include the Troughton & Simms Altazimuth Refractor (1847) at Greenwich Royal Observatory and the Troughton & Simms Astronomical Telescope (1880) for Tokyo Astronomical Observatory.

== Troughton & Simms in the late 19th and early 20th centuries ==
By 1887, Troughton & Simms employed 200 people at their Charlton works. Military production began to be important with production of coincidence rangefinders for the British government. Among their clients were the Italian Navy, the Russian government and the Austro-Hungarian Hydrographic Department Observatory. Undated advertisements from this period include the claim that "in fifteen years our output of levels and theodolites alone was 23,000". An indication of their worldwide sales is how often instruments appear all around the world.

Troughton & Simms did not normally place serial numbers on their products, so dating them is inexact. The "Troughton & Simms" name was originally engraved in a copperplate font, which later changed to a much simpler font. In 1915 James Simms died and the business passed to his sons. They made the company into a limited liability company. After 1915, the company name found on their products is "Troughton & Simms Ltd". After the First World War, business and long-term prospects were poor, and in 1922 Troughton & Simms was bought by T. Cooke & Sons of York to become Cooke, Troughton & Simms.

Notable instruments from this period include a typical late 6-inch theodolite for use by engineers and surveyors and a typical late surveyors level, which can be dated to before 1915 by the lack of "Ltd" after "Troughton & Simms".

== Gallery ==
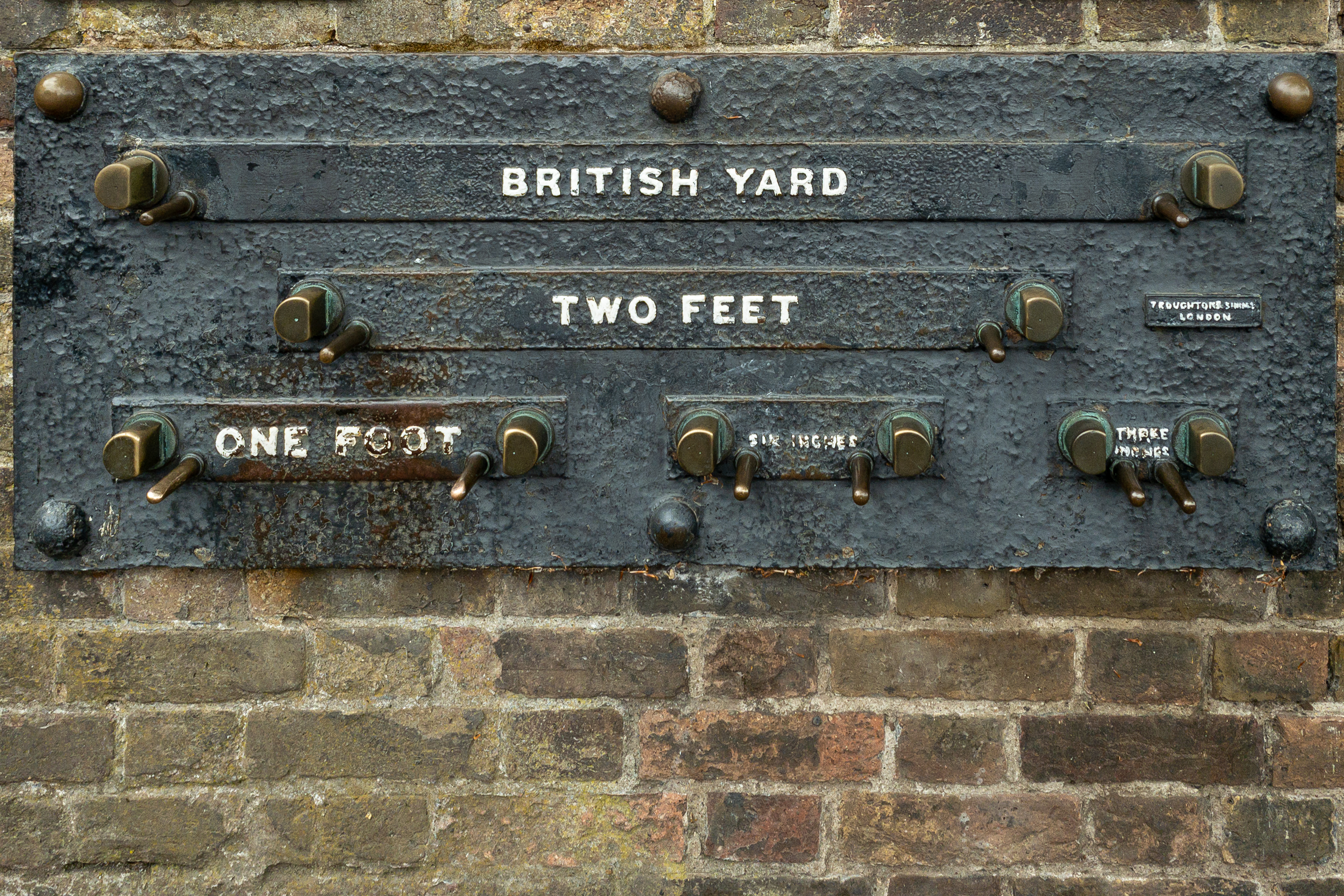
A set of Imperial length gauges at Greenwich Royal Observatory by Troughton & Simms.

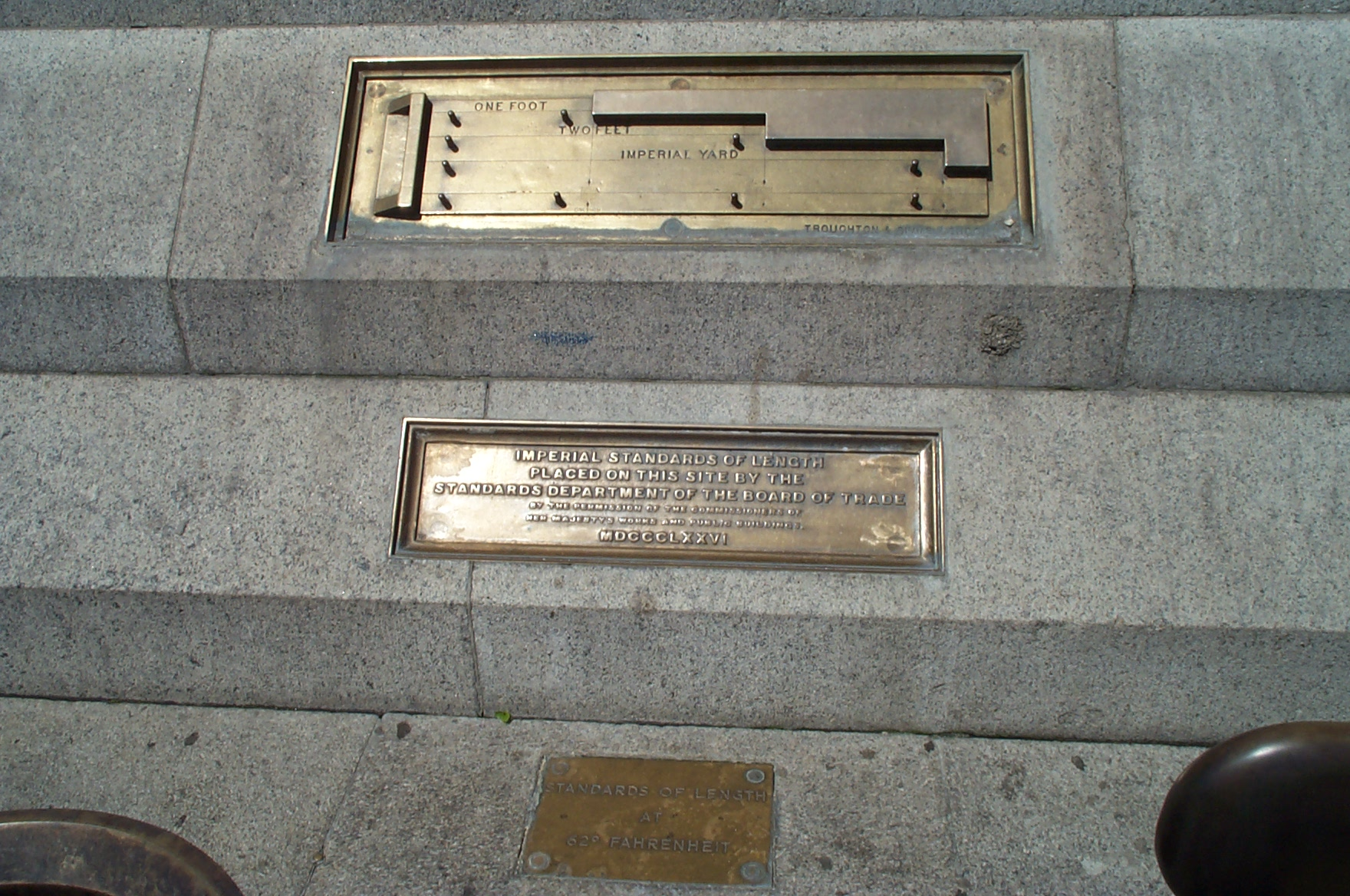
Imperial standards of length, Trafalgar Square, 1876, by Troughton & Simms.

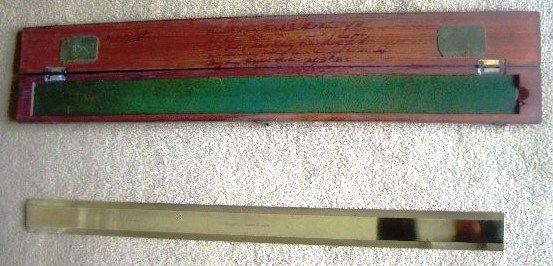
1850s 24-inch brass ruler engraved: "Troughton & Simms, London"
