= Malcolm MacLeod =

Malcolm MacLeod may refer to:

- Malcolm MacLeod (clan chief), Scottish clan chief
- Malcolm MacLeod (British Army officer) (1882–1969), British scientist and Director General of the Ordnance Survey from 1935 to 1943.
- Malcolm MacLeod (politician), politician from New Brunswick, Canada
- Malcolm Plaw MacLeod (1897–1960), Canadian World War I flying ace
- Malcolm Macleod, former Rector of the University of Edinburgh, 1994–1997
