= Shane McLeod =

Shane McLeod may refer to:

- Shane McLeod (field hockey) (born 1968), New Zealand field hockey coach
- Shane McLeod (journalist) (born 1975), Australian journalist
