= Michael McLeod =

Michael or Mike McLeod may refer to:

== Arts and entertainment ==
- Michael McLeod (journalist), American journalist who has written about Bigfoot
- Michael McLeod (musician), Australian bassist and clean vocalist
- Mike McLeod (actor) (born 1985), Canadian film and television actor

== Sport ==
- Michael McLeod (ice hockey) (born 1998), Canadian ice hockey player
- Mike McLeod (athlete) (born 1952), British runner
- Mike McLeod (gridiron football) (born 1958), American football player

== Others ==
- Michael McLeod (politician) (born 1959), Canadian politician
