= William McLeod =

William McLeod may refer to:

- William McLeod (footballer) (1860–1943), Scottish international footballer
- William McLeod (Paralympian), British lawn bowls player
- William Duncan McLeod (1852–1908), Canadian factory owner and politician
- William Mackenzie McLeod (1854–1932), Canadian physician and politician
- William McLeod, television producer and director of photography in the film Calculated Risk

== See also ==
- William MacLeod (disambiguation)
