= Scott MacLeod =

Scott MacLeod may refer to:

- Scott MacLeod (ice hockey) (born 1959), Canadian ice hockey player
- Scott MacLeod (rugby union) (born 1979), Scottish rugby union footballer
- G. Scott MacLeod (born 1965), Canadian multimedia artist and film director

== See also ==
- Scott McLeod (disambiguation)
