= Scott McLeod =

Scott McLeod may refer to:

- Scott McLeod (rugby union) (born 1973), New Zealand rugby union player and coach
- R. W. Scott McLeod (1914–1961), U.S. Department of State official and Ambassador to Ireland
- Scott McLeod, British bassist formerly of The Ya Ya's and briefly of Oasis

== See also ==
- Scott MacLeod (disambiguation)
- Scott McCloud (born 1960), American cartoonist
- Scott McCloud, main character of American animated science fiction television series Space Angel (1962-1964)
