= Cooke, Troughton & Simms =

English instrument-making firm, 1922–1988

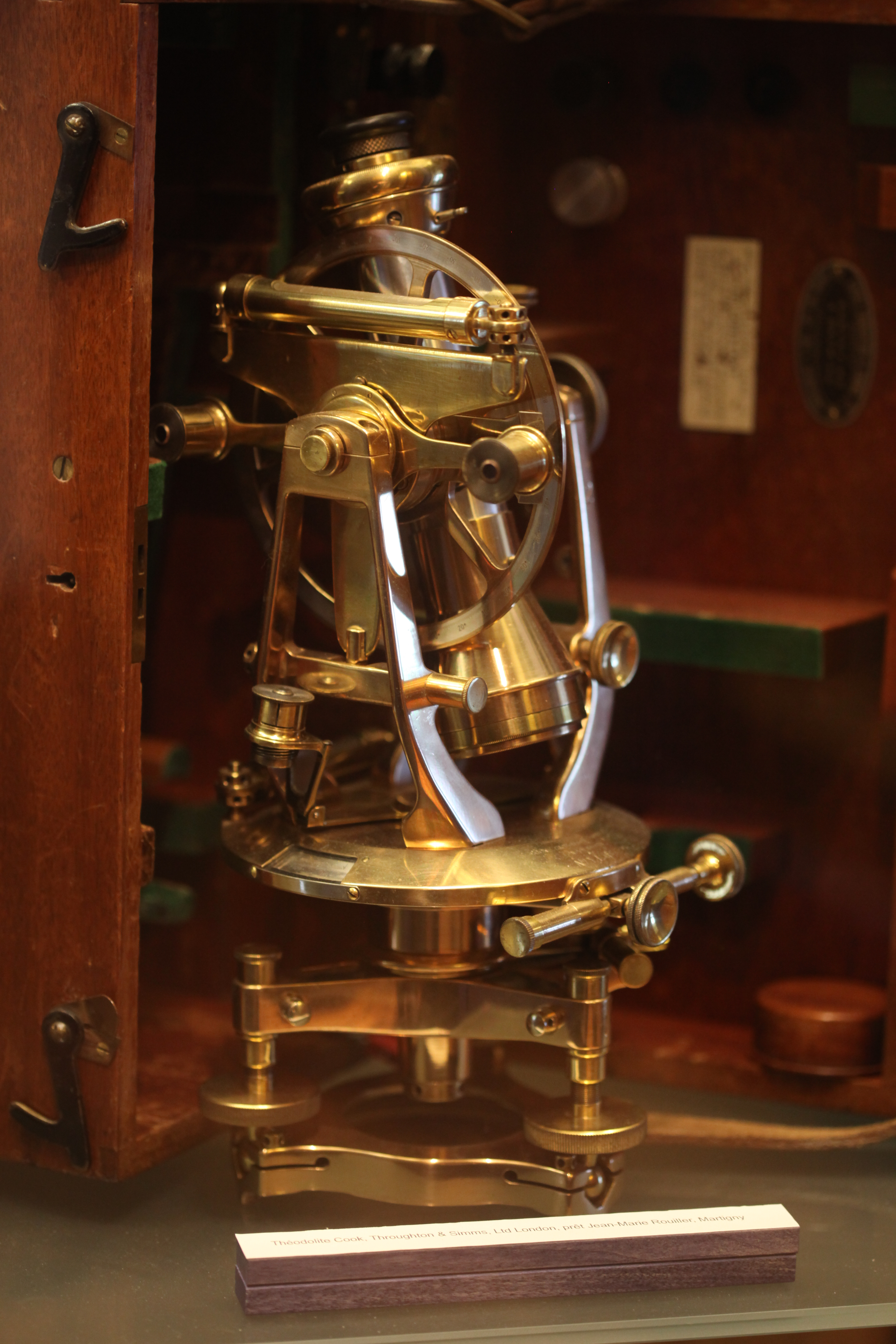
- Cooke, Troughton & Simms Theodolite
- Company type: Subsidiary of Vickers
- Industry: Scientific instruments
- Predecessors: T. Cooke & Sons; Troughton & Simms
- Founded: 1922
- Defunct: 1988
- Fate: Ceased trading in 1988 as part of Vickers Instruments
- Headquarters: York, England
- Products: Microscopes, theodolites
- Number of employees: 3300 (during World War II)

Cooke, Troughton & Simms was an English instrument-making firm formed in York in 1922 by the merger of T. Cooke & Sons and Troughton & Simms.

== Origins ==
Thomas Cooke set up a business in York in 1837 making astronomical telescopes. One early notable instrument was a 4.5 inch equatorial refractor which would have been exceptional at the time. In 1851 Cooke built a 7.25 inch equatorial telescope. Cooke made the optical elements himself for both these instruments. Thomas Cooke built a reputation for high quality optics and, as well as smaller instruments, supplied large instruments to observatories around the world.

From the outset in 1826 and earlier Troughton and Simms of London excelled in the high precision work of dividing circles and so provided many observatories with large transit instruments and supplied national surveys such as the Ordnance Survey, with large transit theodolites.

== Merger ==
In 1922 with business in a depressed state Cooke and Troughton & Simms merged with head offices at York. However foreign competition was strong. In particular the Swiss firm of Wild was making theodolites which were lighter, smaller and more accurate than CTS products.

== Vickers ownership ==
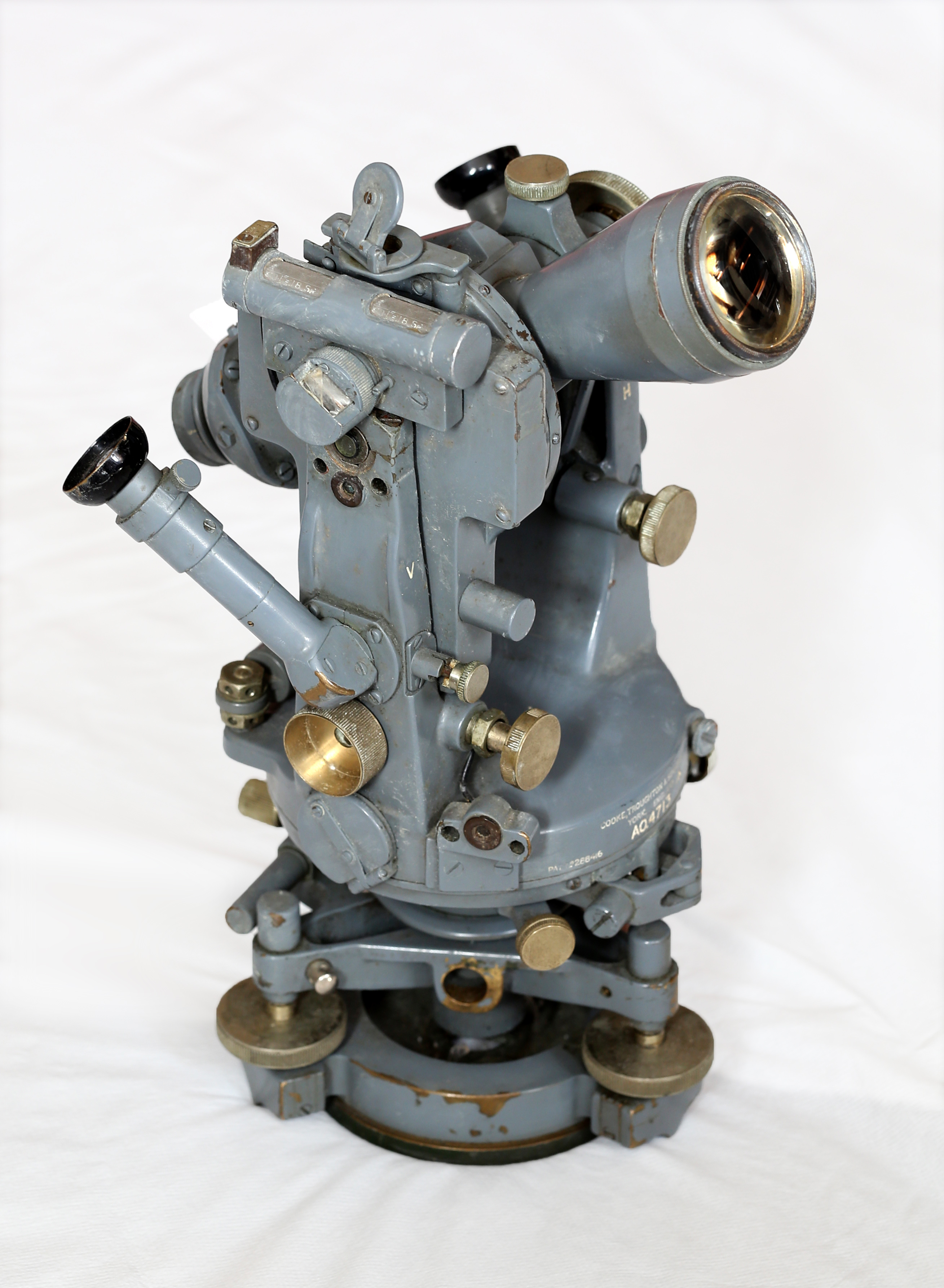
A CTS Tavistock theodolite from the 1940s with the British military broad arrow mark

In 1924 the company became a wholly owned subsidiary of Vickers. In 1926 a meeting was held in Tavistock, Devon with representatives from the Admiralty, the War Office and the Ordnance Survey and Cooke, Troughton & Simms, E. R. Watts and C. F. Casella & Co. On Dartmoor a comparison was made between the products of UK companies and their European competition, especially the Wild T2 theodolite which pioneered enclosed glass circles rather than exposed brass ones. Results were depressing for the British firms.

One result of this event was the Vickers CTS "Tavistock" theodolite which appeared in 1930. The unusual circle reading eyepieces which projected out from each side arose from a wish to avoid infringing the Wild patents. Work began in the autumn of 1931 on the Geodetic Tavistock. where the increased accuracy made it suitable for primary surveys of Canada, Australia, New Zealand, the East African Arc and the retriangulation of Great Britain. In response to user requests a second, lighter version the Geodetic Tavistock appeared in 1937

By 1932 the depressed state of trade had reached a point where the York factory was working at only 40% capacity but was kept going making optical components for Vickers Armstrong and also building the Vickers Projection Microscope. By 1933 only 30% of the factory was in use. In 1938, the telescope manufacturing part of the business was sold to Grubb Parsons.

== Wartime Production ==
In 1936 a list of military requirements was issued by the minister for co-ordination of defence, Sir Thomas Inskip. One result was the building of a new factory in 1938 in Haxby Road, York. The firm's telescope-making business was acquired by Sir Howard Grubb, Parsons and Co. Ltd. At the outbreak of war in 1939 the UK government placed large orders for military sighting telescopes and theodolites. By 1940 output was only limited by the supply of raw materials and orders exceeded £1,000,000.

During the Second World War many Tavistock theodolites were used in artillery observation and many other applications by survey regiments. During this period 3,300 people were employed by the company. Anticipating post war trading conditions several new products such as medical microscopes suited to a civilian role were developed using tooling created for wartime production.

At the end of the Second World War, a film entitled Cooke Troughton & Simms in Wartime 1939-1945 was released which documented the manufacturing processes used to produce many of the optical instruments which were used in tanks, aeroplanes and on ships. The Haxby Road factory was re-designated "Kingsway North" with a workforce of 900 in 1939, rising to 2000 in 1941 and peaking in 1943.

== Post War Products ==
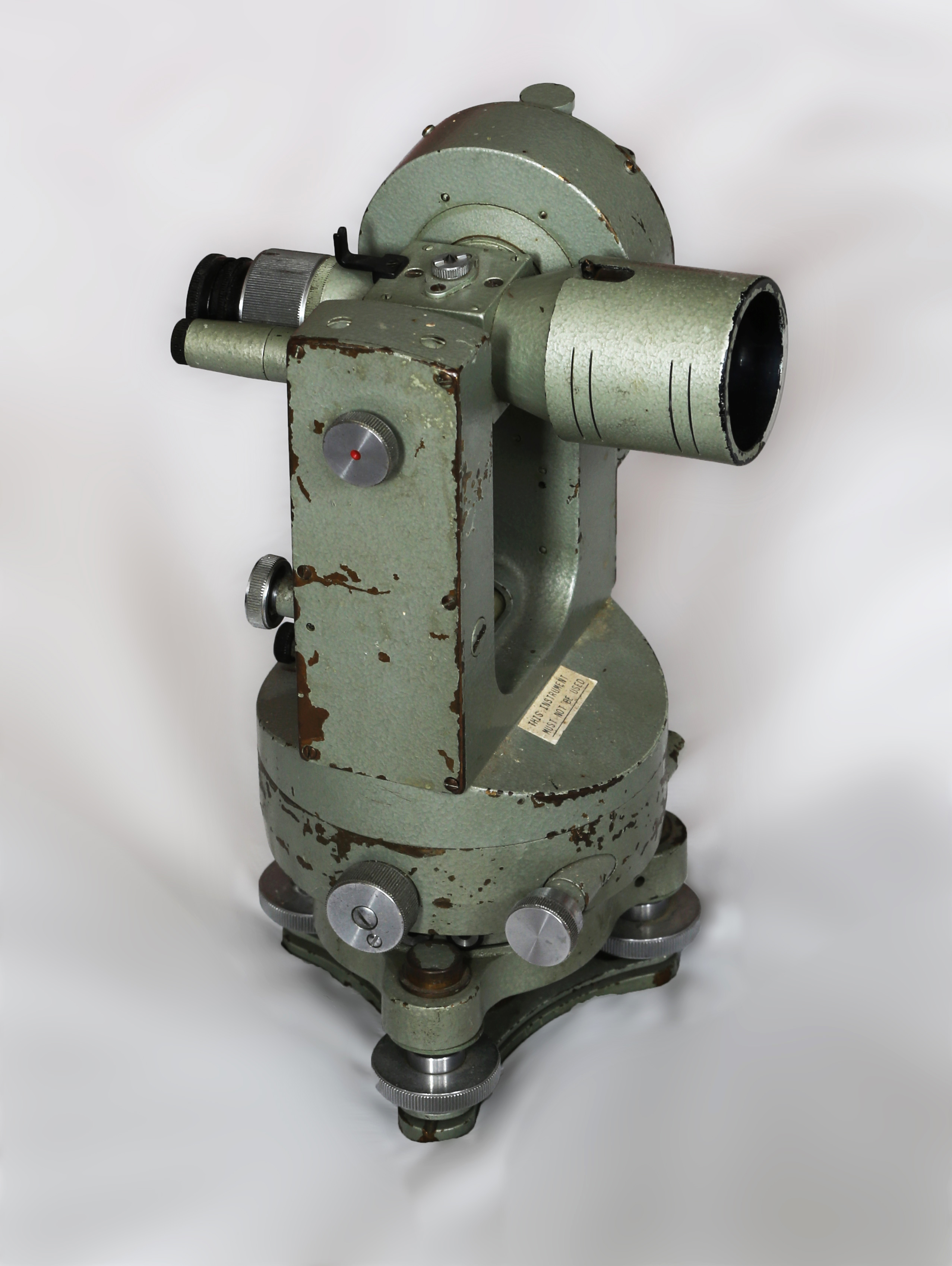
A CTS V22 theodolite from the 1960s

In 1963 CTS became a part of the new Vickers Instruments Ltd. During this period it made the Vickers V.11 and V.22 theodolites.

The company produced a range of precision microscopes and survey equipment including theodolites and it manufactured one of the first usable interference microscopes. A 1950 catalogue listed the following range of microscopes:

- M1005/M1025 - student microscopes
- M1000 - 'general purpose' microscope
- M2000 - microscope for 'routine and research investigations'
- M3000 - The M2000 with vertical adjustment to the stage
- M4000 - 'universal stand' for visual and photographic examination
- M6000 - stereo microscope
- M7000 - polarizing microscope

Cooke, Troughton & Simms ceased trading in 1988. Upon closure all buildings on the site were demolished, leaving only the concrete foundations and as of October 2018, the site is still waiting to be redeveloped.
