= T. Cooke & Sons =

English instrument makers, 1837–1851

- Industry: Instrument making
- Founded: 1837
- Founder: Thomas Cooke
- Defunct: 1922
- Fate: merged with Troughton & Simms
- Successor: Cooke, Troughton & Simms
- Headquarters: York, England
- Area served: Worldwide
- Key people: Dennis Taylor
- Products: Optical lenses and instruments
- Number of employees: 5 (1851)

T. Cooke & Sons was an English instrument-making firm, headquartered in York. It was founded by Thomas Cooke by 1837.

== History ==
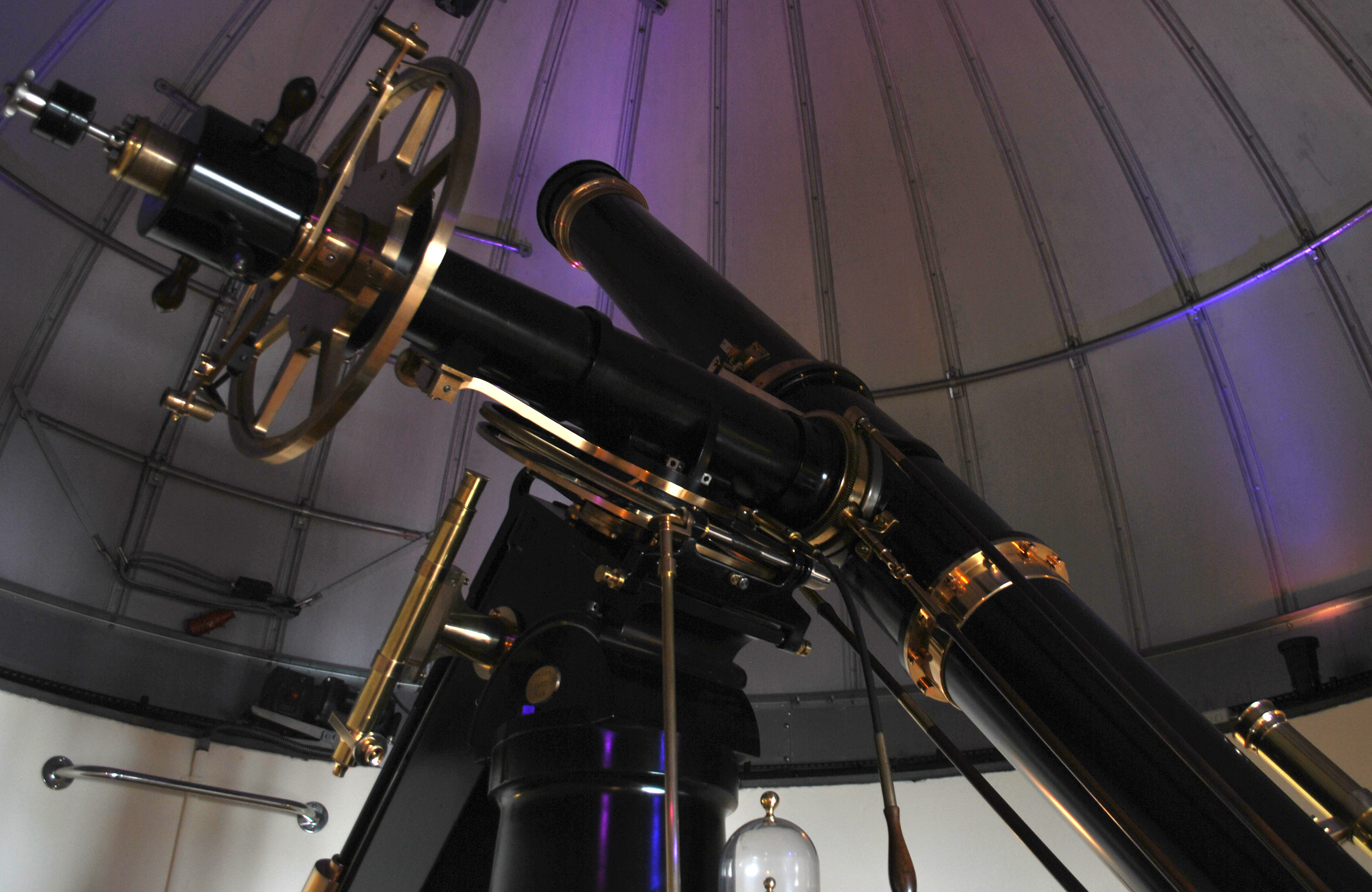
The Fry 8-inch-aperture refracting telescope, manufactured by Thomas Cooke in the 1860s, at the University of London Observatory.

In 1837 Cooke leased a shop at 50 Stonegate, York, with his wife running the shop and Cooke's workshop occupying the rear where he made and repaired whatever instruments were needed. He made a screw-cutting lathe for his own use. A notable instrument made at this time was a 4.5 inch equatorial refracting telescope. Cooke himself made the whole instrument including the optical elements at a time when most instrument makers specialised in making either the optical or mechanical components.

The 1851 census shows that Cooke employed four men and an apprentice. In 1855 Cooke exhibited at the Exposition Universelle in Paris and won a First Class Medal for a 7.5 inch equatorial refractor. By 1855 Thomas Cooke had built a factory at Bishophill in York.

In 1864 Cooke undertook his first order for surveying equipment when he built 16 theodolites to be sent to India. On arrival they were found to be very well made except that the circle division was faulty. They were returned to York and redivided. By 1870 The Survey of India used Cooke levels for the primary survey in preference to Troughton & Simms products as they considered them to be superior.

Following the death of Cooke in 1868, the business was continued by his sons.

The firm built the clock face on the Darlington clock tower. Cooke & Sons also provided a 12 inch theodolite for the construction of the Forth Railway Bridge. Observatory domes were also made using papier-maché including in 1883 one for Greenwich Observatory.

In 1892 Dennis Taylor, working to reduce chromatic aberration, invented a three element lens design incorporating a new Schott glass element. This design was called a 'photo-visual' design and used for both visual and photographic astronomy. Taylor became Optical Manager at the firm in 1893.

Six lightweight theodolites were made for Scott's ill-fated Terra Nova Expedition of 1910-1913.

Dennis Taylor modified his three element lens design for photographic purposes, patenting his work in 1905 and 1906. This 'Cooke Triplet' lens design was an improvement on most camera lenses of the time though it was in competition with the 1902 Zeiss Tessar design. In 1904 Taylor discovered that a tarnished surface layer could reduce reflections from glass surfaces. Although this effect had been discovered by Lord Rayleigh in 1886 the use of lens coatings was not widely known.

With war looming the firm began to work with Arthur Pollen on his 'Aim Correction' system for improving the accuracy of naval gunnery. Cooke & Sons supplied the optical components for the system which consisted of a gyroscopically stabilised rangefinder where successive readings of a moving target were mechanically integrated to give a prediction of range and bearing. In the event the British Admiralty for the most part chose the simpler and cheaper Dreyer predictor.

In 1914, a new factory was built in Bishophill. In 1915 Vickers acquired a controlling stake in the company. During World War I about half of the factory's capacity was turned over to contracts for large naval rangefinders from the main contractor, Barr & Stroud

In 1922 Vickers merged it with Troughton & Simms to form Cooke, Troughton & Simms.

== See also ==
- Cooke Optics
- Grubb Parsons - contemporary Irish telescope company, founded in 1833
