= Retriangulation of Great Britain =

1935–1962 geodetic survey of Great Britain

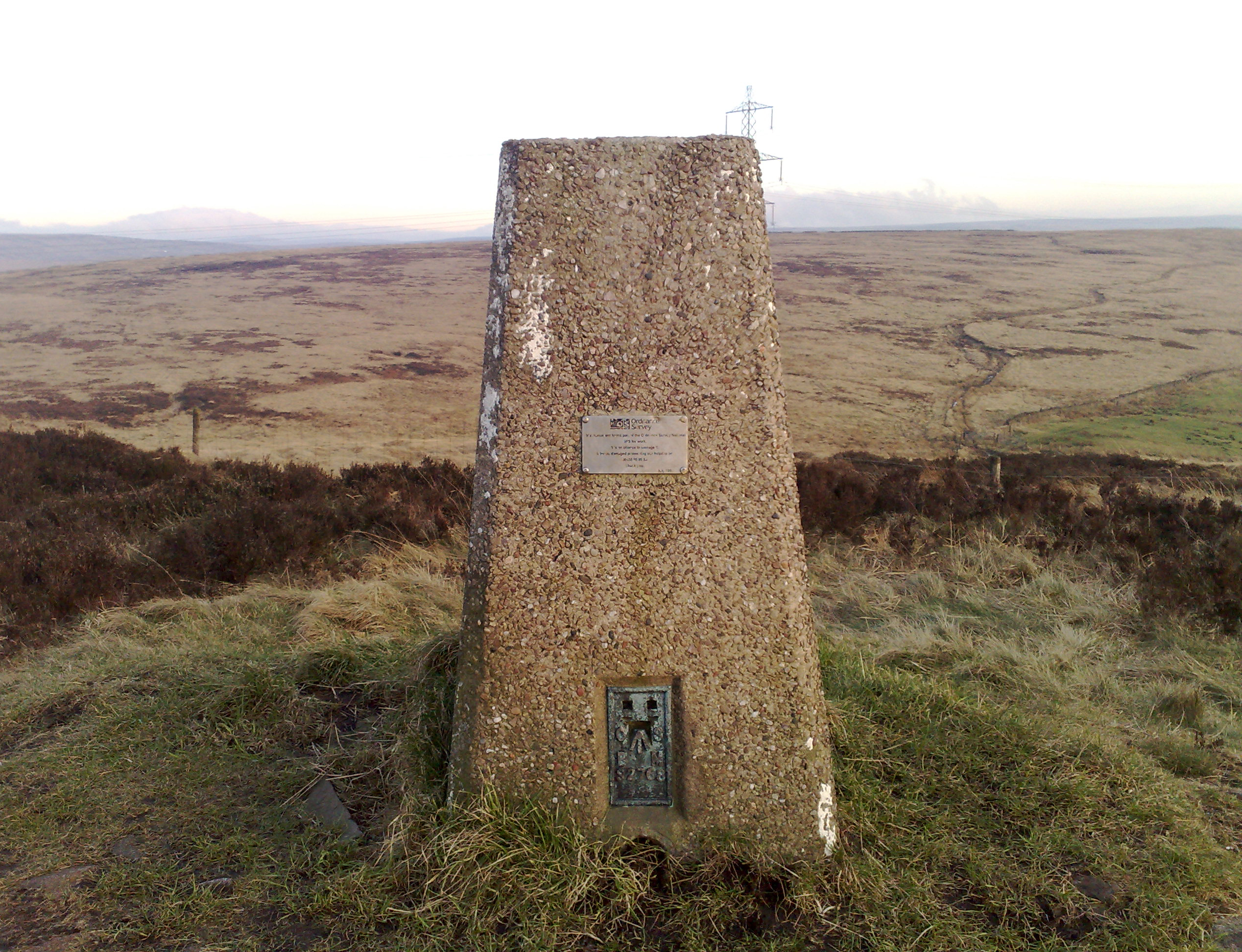
The Crow Knowl triangulation station at Crompton Moor in the South Pennines. It is one of the concrete pillars erected by the Ordnance Survey during the retriangulation of Great Britain. It was possible (in clear weather) to see at least two other trig points from any one trig point.

The Retriangulation of Great Britain was a triangulation project carried out between 1935 and 1962 that sought to improve the accuracy of maps of Great Britain. Data gathered from the retriangulation replaced data gathered during the Principal Triangulation of Great Britain, which had been performed between 1783 and 1851.

The work was designed to form a complete new survey control network for the whole country, and to unify the mapping of the United Kingdom from local county projections into a single national datum projection and reference system. Its completion led to the establishment of the OSGB36 datum and Ordnance Survey National Grid in use today.

== History and overview ==
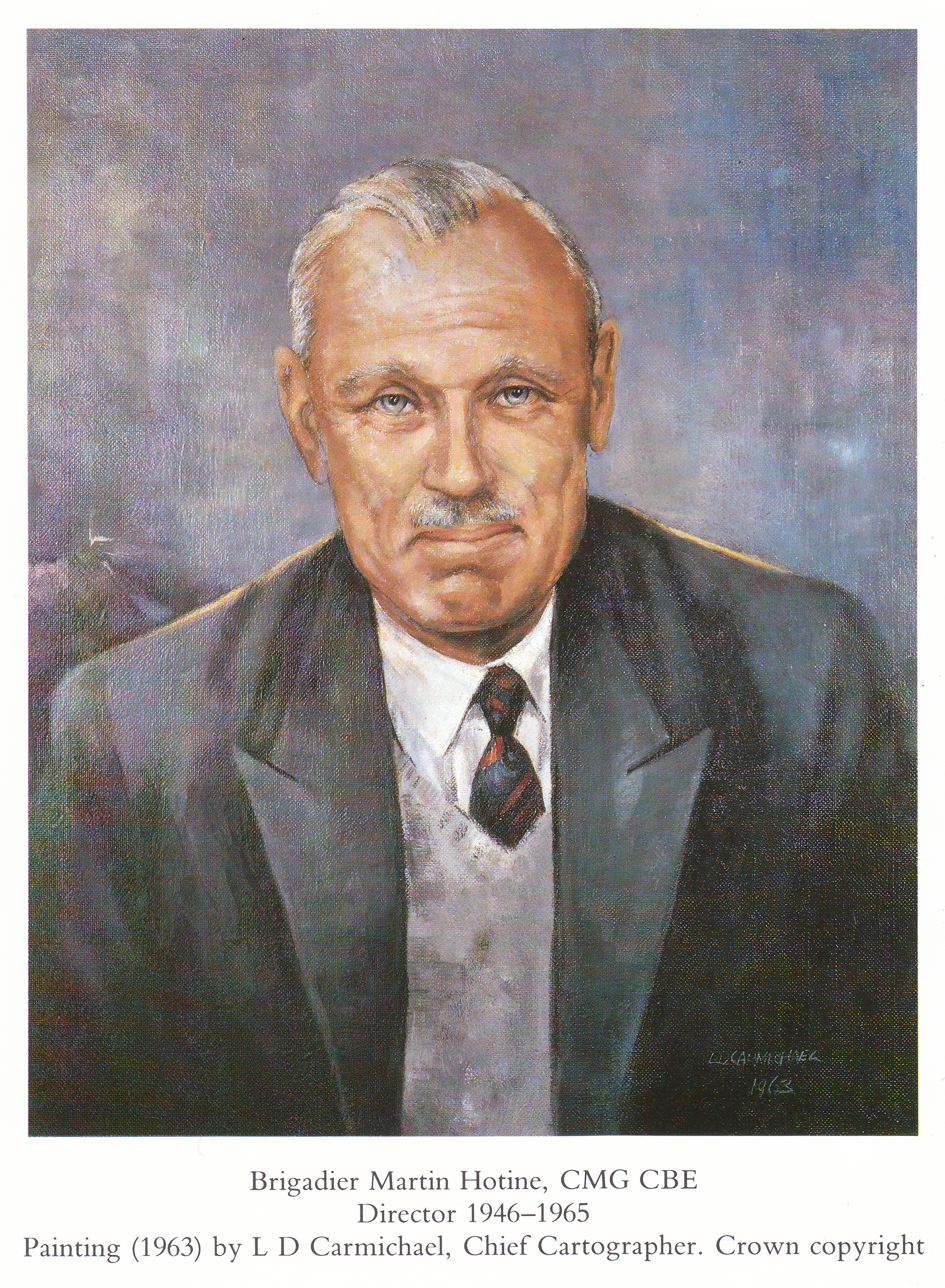
Martin Hotine (17 June 1898 – 12 November 1968), head of the Trigonometrical and Levelling Division of the Ordnance Survey responsible for the retriangulation

The retriangulation was begun in 1935 by the Director General of the Ordnance Survey, Major-General Malcolm MacLeod. It was directed by the cartographer and mathematician Martin Hotine, head of the Trigonometrical and Levelling Division (TLD).

The work was halted by the outbreak of World War II in 1939, by which time the primary triangulation network covered all of England and Wales, but only as far as the Moray Firth in Scotland. Secondary triangulation had commenced in 1945, and after the end of the war, the retriangulation work was focused on secondary and lower-order survey work, to expedite the completion of new large-scale surveys.

The wartime priorities of the TLD were focused on survey work in connection with the war effort, such as airfield and military construction, survey and computations for anti-aircraft and coastal battery positions, and survey of radiolocation sites. One-third of the Ordnance Survey staff were called up during the war, and the headquarters in Southampton was bombed and badly damaged. Staff were relocated to the Home Counties, where they produced 1:25,000 scale maps of France, Italy, Germany and most of the rest of Europe in preparation for invasion. Primary triangulation observations were not resumed until 1949, and completed in 1952.

A problem during the Principal Triangulation was that the exact locations of surveying stations were not always rediscoverable, relying on buried markers and unreliable local knowledge. To overcome this, a network of permanent surveying stations was built, most familiarly the concrete triangulation pillars (about 6,500 of them) found on many British Isles hill and mountain tops, but there were many other kinds of surveying stations used.

To minimise differences between the 1783–1851 survey and the retriangulation, eleven Principal Triangulation stations, ranging from Dunnose on the Isle of Wight to Great Whernside in Yorkshire, were chosen and pillars erected on them to act as the core framework from which all other measurements were made.

The main work of the Retriangulation was finished in 1962, creating the Ordnance Survey National Grid. This system continued to be used, and measurements refined by ground-based surveying, into the 1980s, after which satellite use took over. Electronic measuring devices were introduced towards the end of the Retriangulation, but at that time were not proven reliable enough to replace traditional surveying.

== The Primary Retriangulation and survey field work ==
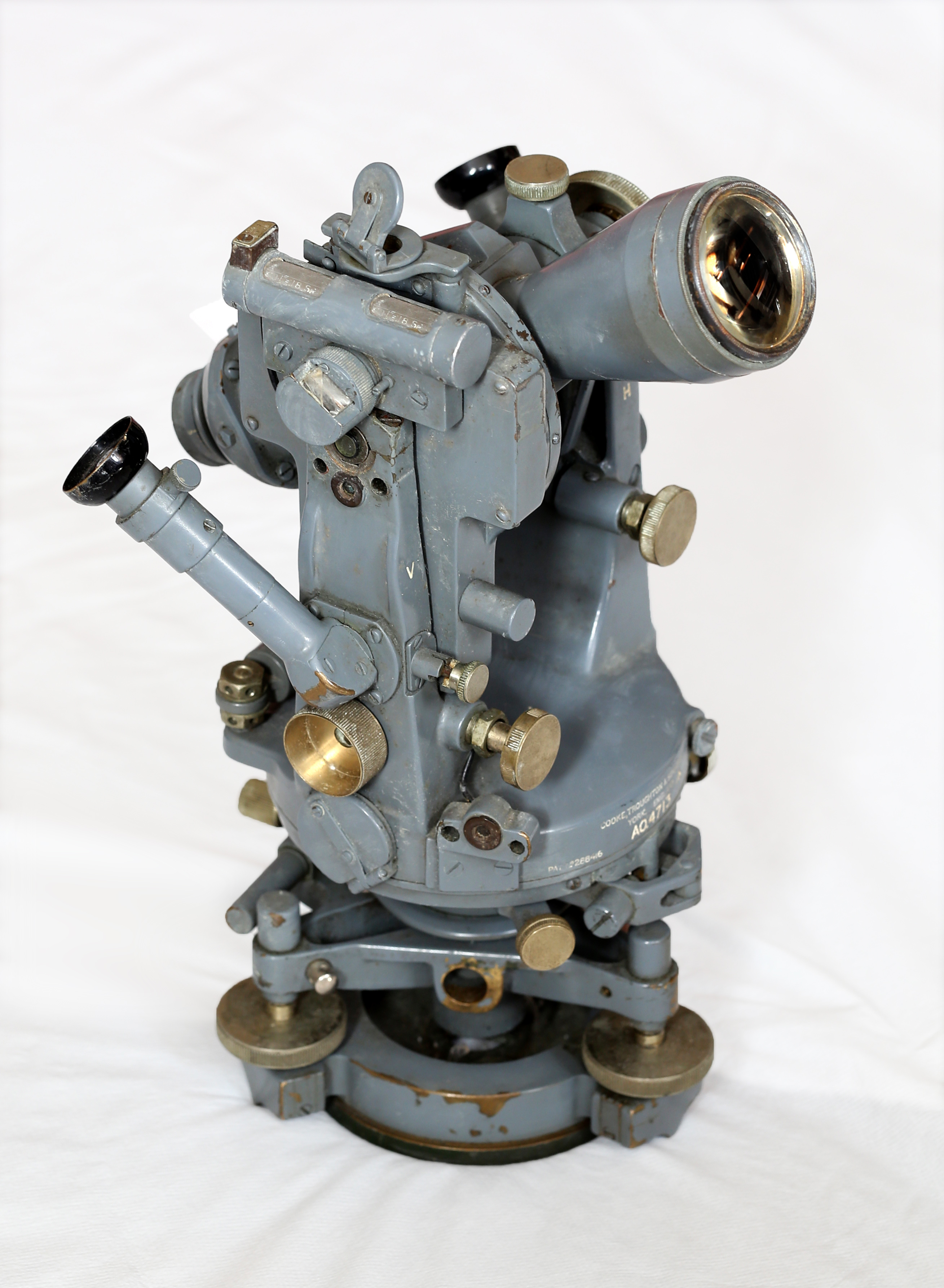
A Tavistock theodolite

One of the first steps in the retriangulation was the adoption of a new projection for the mapping, with the existing Cassini projection replaced by the Transverse Mercator. This was preferred by the Ordnance Survey because the use of the Cassini projection would have resulted in angular distortion of almost four minutes of arc in the survey.

=== Planning and work on the new projection ===
Neither the solid form of the Earth, nor the geoid (an equipotential surface of Earth's gravity field, comparable to the imaginary surface that mean sea level would follow in the absence of winds, tides and currents), can be fully defined by simple formulae. The spheroid is the nearest mathematical model, but as no one spheroid fits worldwide, a number have to be used. The Airy spheroid provides a good fit in the region of the British Isles, and the Transverse Mercator Projection of this spheroid was therefore adopted by the Ordnance Survey as the basis of the national co-ordinate system.

No projection can be true to scale across its entirety. In the Transverse Mercator, the scale at any given point increases in correlation with its east or west distance from the central meridian. The scale along the north-south line that contains the point remains consistent. The true origin of the projection lies at latitude 49° N, longitude 2° W. A false origin positioned roughly 170 kilometres west of The Lizard was established to ensure all national grid coordinates remained positive, as the whole country is further east and further north than that point. In this system, the central meridian is 400 km east.

The scale on the central meridian should be correct, or 1. However, to ensure that scale error is imperceptible on the national mapping at the eastern and western boundaries, a scale reduction of 1:2500 was applied. This provides a local scale factor of 0.9996 at the central meridian. The scale continually increases with distance from the central meridian, east and west, reaching 1 at 580 km east and 220 km west. It continues to rise, reaching 1.0005 at the eastern and western extremes.

The corresponding local scale factor must be employed to convert a site measured plane length to a projection distance, and vice versa. As the spheroid is set at mean sea level, any surveyed length must be reduced to mean sea level before applying the local scale factor.

=== Commencement of retriangulation fieldwork ===
The primary triangulation work commenced with the division of survey work into blocks. The size of these blocks was governed by the largest number of survey observations which could be computed in a simultaneous least-squares adjustment. Reconnaissance of survey stations was commenced in 1935, using Tavistock theodolites to confirm the inter-visibility of stations.

Survey of the triangulation commenced in April 1936, with observations made during the hours of darkness to electric beacon lamps manufactured by Cooke, Troughton & Simms. In flat areas of the country, such as East Anglia, Bilby towers designed by the United States Coast and Geodetic Survey were used.

=== World War II ===
The triangulation was still incomplete at the outbreak of World War II, with five of the seven blocks completed, and two main baselines (one between Whitehorse Hill and Liddington Castle, and the second in Lossiemouth) measured.

At the outbreak of the war, the Ordnance Survey regional offices in Bristol, Tunbridge Wells, London, and Edinburgh were reduced to a care and maintenance basis, with only occasional activity connected to wartime survey projects. This was the situation until 1944, when an increase in staff levels was made by men returning from war service.

=== Resumption of the retriangulation ===
At the end of the war, the most urgent task was the provision of secondary, tertiary, and lower-order control for large-scale surveys. However, on 11 May 1949, the observations to complete the primary triangulation had recommenced, focused on completion of block six in Scotland, which included the Outer Hebrides, Orkney, and Shetland. Two independent survey teams were used, the first covering an area from Caithness to the Northern Isles, and the second commencing from the boundary of survey block three in Argyll.

The difficulties of completing the field survey work in the Scottish Highlands included completing observations on Ben Nevis in sub-zero temperatures with heavy snowfall, surveying over mountainous terrain, and transportation between various remote Scottish Islands. A member of the survey team suffered a dislocated shoulder when he was attacked by Arctic skuas, whose nesting had been inadvertently disturbed by his work. The work on Ben Nevis alone took twenty-two nights to complete. By 1962 the retriangulation of Britain was complete, with aerial surveying expediting the work in the latter stages.

=== Connection to France ===
The completion of block six was achieved in 1951, and a new block (seven) was added to connect the triangulation to the Isle of Man. In addition, a connection with France was made across the Strait of Dover in collaboration with the Institut national de l'information géographique et forestière. Survey stations on the British side were at Beachy Head, Fairlight Down, Paddlesworth, and Rumsfelds Water Tower, and in France stations at La Canche, Montlambert, Saint-Inglevert, and Gravelines were used. The results were considered good, with the average survey misclosure (the angular error of lines or rays measured during a traverse survey) being only one second of arc.

=== Connection to Ireland ===
A connection was made to Ireland in 1952, in co-operation with Ordnance Survey Ireland. Observations commenced on 19 April 1952, but were initially hampered by heavy rain and clouds. The survey ray between Trostan and Slieve Donard was abandoned after numerous attempts, but was subsequently completed when Slieve Donard was re-occupied to observe the Holyhead ray in July 1952, with the survey team forced to wait twenty-five nights to complete the third and final observation. The Kippure to South Barrule (Isle of Man) ray, 95 miles long and obscured by smog from Dublin, was eventually abandoned.

By mid-June 1952, the northern section of the connection was complete. Observations for the internal retriangulation of Northern Ireland were then undertaken, whilst the UK survey parties completed additional work to strengthen the western edge of the primary retriangulation on the coast of Wales. On 28 July 1952, work commenced on the southern half of the connection. As the work moved southward, the rays across the Irish Sea became progressively longer.

On 3 September 1952, work began to observe the longest ray in the entire retriangulation, measuring 98 miles (158 km) between the Preseli mountains (Wales) and Ballycreen in County Wicklow. The statutory three nights were sufficient for the completion of this work. A further ray between Preseli and Kippure was not considered essential and, after partial observation, was abandoned.

The Ordnance Survey Ireland team then moved to the Hill of Tara and Forth Mountain in Wexford, but deteriorating weather conditions meant that the work could not be completed until 8 October 1952. This marked the completion of the connection and retriangulation, with an average misclosure of 1.16 seconds.

=== Connections to Iceland and Norway ===
The triangulation was connected to both Norway and Iceland using HIRAN, an enhanced version of SHORAN. Survey connections extending from primary triangulation points in Scotland to triangulation points in Norway and Iceland were facilitated by the US Air Force under the implementation of a project known as the North Atlantic Tie.

Shortly after World War II, the US Air Force had carried out a readjustment of all the triangulations of continental Europe to produce a geodetic datum known as ED50, a single system on the Universal Transverse Mercator coordinate system. The North Atlantic Tie initiative aimed to create a geodetic link between North America and Europe, by measuring a trilateration network, and permitting the positioning of European triangulation stations relative to the North American Datum.

From July to September 1953, the US Air Force used HIRAN to survey a link between three geodetic stations in Norway and three on the Scottish mainland and Shetland islands. This marked the initial phase of a larger project which connected surveys of Norway, Iceland, and Greenland to Canada. The network linking Scotland to Norway comprised fifteen measured lines: three among the Norwegian stations, three among the Scottish and Shetlandic stations, and nine lines across the North Sea.

The SHORAN geodetic stations did not precisely match the geodetic triangulation stations, but the proximity was considered such that no significant error was ascribed to the transfer from one to the other. The Norwegian stations were:

- Skibmannshei
- Hellisøy fyrstasjon
- Eigeberg.

And the British stations were:

- Saxa Vord
- Warth Hill, Cumbria (SD568844)
- Mormond Hill 338.

Each of the fifteen survey lines was gauged by six line crossings at each of two altitude levels, totalling twelve crossings, all forming part of a survey mission. The distance between two survey stations was derived from the minimum sum of the signal transit times from a transmitter, carried in an aircraft flying across the line to be measured, to a pair of terminals at each end of the line and back. A mission was approved provided:

- at least four of the six crossings in each group did not deviate from the group mean by more than 0.003 miles (16 feet)
- the two group means agreed within 0.003 miles, and
- the flight condition appeared generally satisfactory.

The most inaccurate of the rejected survey missions deviated from the accepted measure by 0.0055 miles (29 feet), and the average disparity between a rejected measure and the mean of the accepted measures was 0.0013 miles (6 feet). The final results and assessment were computed from observation of ground survey positions, including stations in both Iceland and the Faroe Islands.

The operation was largely successful, but the Ordnance Survey considered that the results were not of a geodetic standard necessary for primary triangulation, and a 12 metres (39 ft) discrepancy existed in the measurements between Norwegian stations.

== The Cotswolds adjustment ==
Concurrently with the retriangulation programme, a procedure was put in place for overhauling and updating 1:2500 Ordnance Survey maps in dense urban areas. The programme, known as Overhaul, was commenced with early experiments on methods undertaken in the Cotswolds, and the work done to realise the adjustments made to the 1:2500 maps became known as 'the Cotswolds adjustment' or 'Cotswolds Overhaul'.

The Cotswolds Overhaul was a two-stage process. The first stage required the old maps to be updated to eliminate distortions in size and shape, aligning them with the new projections and control from the retriangulation process. In addition, the map details, many of which had not been updated since the 1891–1914 revision, were reviewed and revised. The new triangulation stations were incorporated into the old maps to complement local details and align with accurate grid positions.

The effectiveness of the Cotswolds Overhaul hinged on inserting enough National Grid survey control to align the old maps with the new triangulation. Overdoing it risked deforming the old details to a degree that would render revision impossible. This delicate equilibrium was achievable in parts of the UK where many of the new triangulation stations could be plotted in the correct relation to the old details. However, in open rural areas, positioning the triangulation stations within the detail framework was problematic, and the method began to falter.

Tests conducted in the early 1970s demonstrated that the Cotswold's accuracy standard (+2.5 metre standard error) had not been achieved across all areas. Two solutions emerged: a complete resurvey, or fixing and incorporating additional control in a way that restored the overhaul accuracy standard at a significantly lower cost. However cost comparisons later led to the conclusion that, in most circumstances, a resurvey was preferable.

== See also ==
- Geodesy
- OSGB36
- Reference frame
- Triangulation
- Trig point

== Bibliography ==
- Ordnance Survey (1967). The history of the retriangulation of Great Britain 1935-1962 (PDF). London: Her Majesty's Stationery Office.
- Owen, Tim; Pilbeam, Elaine (1992). Ordnance Survey, map makers to Britain since 1791 (PDF). Southampton: Ordnance Survey (HMSO). ISBN 9780319002490. OCLC 28220563.
- Seymour, W. A., ed. (1980). A History of the Ordnance Survey (PDF). Folkestone, England: Dawson. ISBN 0-7129-0979-6. OCLC 654935343.
