= Harold Dennis Taylor =

English optical designer (1862–1943)

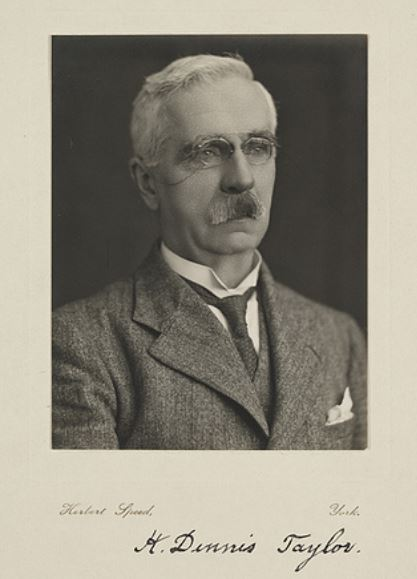
- Born: 10 July 1862; Huddersfield, Yorkshire, England
- Died: 26 February 1943 (aged 80); Coxwold, North Yorkshire
- Known for: Invention of Cooke Triplet
- Awards: Duddell Medal and Prize, 1933
- Scientific career
- Fields: Optics
- Workplaces: Cooke and Sons of York

Harold Dennis Taylor (10 July 1862, in Huddersfield – 26 February 1943) was a British optical designer and inventor, chiefly famous for the invention of the Cooke Triplet, although he was granted about 50 other patents.

He was born in 1862 in Huddersfield, attended St Peter's School, York, and began the study of architecture. Circa 1880, he abandoned this to work at Thomas Cooke and Sons of York, a company which produced the finest quality optical instruments, telescopes in particular.

As optical manager and chief designer for Thomas Cooke, he won fame for the design and patent in 1893 of the Cooke Triplet and was awarded the Duddell Medal and Prize in 1933.

He married Charlotte Fernandes Barff on 24 July 1888. They had one daughter, Doris, and two sons, Leslie and Edward, who was also a published optical designer. He died in retirement in Coxwold, North Yorkshire.

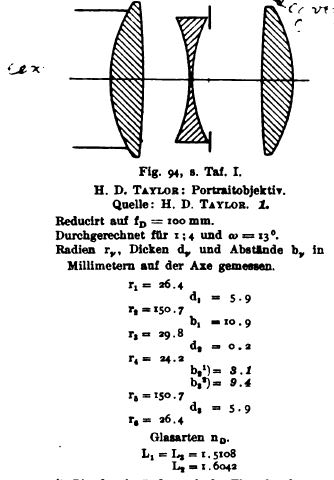
Cooke triplet

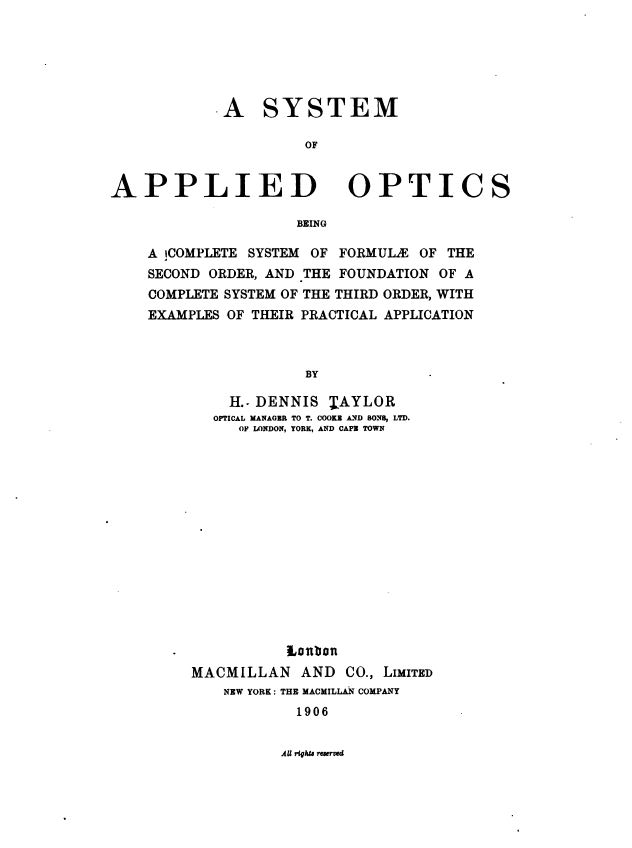
