= Angus McLeod =

Angus McLeod may refer to:

- Angus McLeod (politician) (1857–1902), farmer, lumber merchant and political figure in Ontario, Canada
- Angus McLeod (sport shooter) (born 1964), British sport shooter
- Angus McLeod (footballer) (1890–1917), Scottish football forward

== See also ==
- Angus MacLeod (disambiguation)
