= Angus MacLeod =

Angus MacLeod may refer to:

- Angus MacLeod (politician) (1845–1908), farmer and political figure on Prince Edward Island
- Angus MacLeod (Royal Navy officer) (1847–1920), Senior Royal Navy officer
- Angus Macleod (journalist) (1951–2014), British journalist and editor

== See also ==
- Angus McLeod (disambiguation)
