= William Douglas Macleod =

British artist (1892–1963)

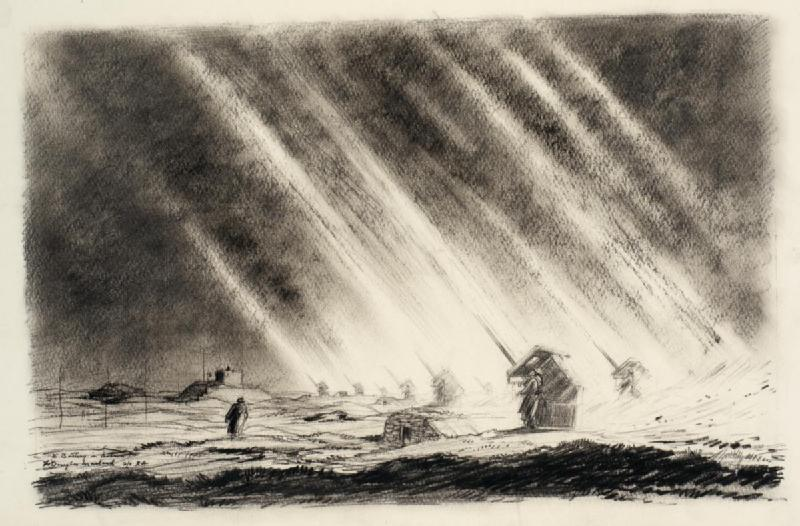
'Z' Rocket a Battery in Action, a 1941 drawing by Macleod

William Douglas Macleod, also known as W.D. Macleod, (1 January 1892 – 21 March 1963) was a Scottish etcher who produced around 160 recorded plates between 1913 and 1949. He also painted in oil, made pencil and pastel drawings and created poster images for the British Railways' West Highland Line.

== Early life and education ==
Born in 1892 in Clarkston, East Renfrewshire, Scotland, Macleod's drawing skills were recognised early-on by his school master at the Greenock Academy, William Walker (1878–1961), himself a professional etcher. At school, Macleod became a life-long friend of the novelist George Blake (1893–1961), whose portrait he executed on at least three occasions and whose novel The Shipbuilders was to make a strong impression on him. Due to family pressure, Macleod began his professional life age 15, working at The British Linen Bank between 1906 and 1914, while also attending evening art classes at Edinburgh College of Art.

Macleod served in the mounted cavalry of the Royal Artillery during World War I and whilst serving was involved in panoramic sketching for military purposes. In 1917, he was severely wounded in the leg. Whilst recovering in an American field hospital, he made a sketch of a fellow officer lying in critical condition, now in the collection at the National Galleries of Scotland.

After the war and demobilization, Macleod enrolled at the Glasgow School of Art between 1918 and 1922, where he studied under Maurice Greiffenhagen (1862–1931) and Robert Anning Bell (1863–1933).

== Career ==
Upon graduation, Macleod began sketching landscapes and composing scenes of life in Venice, Brittany, Flanders, Spain and North Africa. He subsequently produced etchings documenting his travels during the 1920s. Macleod also secured the position of cartoonist and illustrator for the Glasgow Evening News.

At the start of 1922, he began selling his work through the print dealer William B. Simpson whose premises were at 84 St Vincent Street in Glasgow. In 1923 he purchased his first etching press for £20. From 1922 until the end of the 1940s, Simpson was Macleod's agent, publisher and gallerist, providing him with regular one-man shows and helping Macleod gain an international reputation, notably in the United States. He thus exhibited annually at the Paris Salon, The Royal Scottish Academy, The Royal Glasgow Institute of the Fine Arts, as well as group shows at the Art Club, J&J Bennet, the Greatorex Gallery in London and Frost & Reed in Bristol.

After the Wall Street Crash of 1929, the art market for etchings slumped and Macleod was compelled to widen his artistic output. Macleod began to produce colour works, principally Scottish landscapes. These include works depicting Machrihanish and the Kintyre Peninsula, Uist, Sutherland, Skye and Harris. After serving in the Second World War, from the 1940s onwards, he worked largely in pastel and oil and was commissioned to document the evolving topography of the Highlands, preceding and following the building of hydro electric dams.

After his death, Macleod's etching press was given by his widow, Averil, to the artist Willie Rodger (1930–2018) in around 1967. In 2017 Rodger gifted the etching press to Edinburgh Printmakers with a proviso that a small plaque be affixed to it giving the lineage back to Macleod. In 2025 his family donated a complete set of Macleod's known etchings and a group of drawings to the National Galleries of Scotland in memory of his daughter Ann Crawford. His work is represented at Glasgow Museums and the National Galleries of Scotland, Edinburgh.

== Personal life ==
During his Diploma years at Glasgow School of Art, Macleod met and later married Averil Pratt (d. 1979), a fellow painting student. She was the niece of the Scottish painter William Pratt (1855–1936) and the marriage took place in Bearsden, East Dunbartonshire, in 1928. The couple lived in Lenzie in the house left to them by Averil's uncle Willie. They had two daughters: Ann Crawford (1929–2023) and Gillian Wood (1937–2001). Macleod was a scratch level golfer and in 1959 gave five small oil paintings to his local golf club, alongside a specially commissioned mural.

Ann Crawford (née Macleod), the eldest daughter of W.D. Macleod, was a Scottish artist, influenced by the abstract school of painters such as Kenneth Nolan, Ivon Hitchens and Albert Irvin who gradually built up a body of work in the latter part of her life. After being widowed at age 40, Crawford became an administrator of the Glasgow School of Art in 1981, where she remained until retirement. Gillian Wood (née Macleod) was the mother of British artist and graphic designer Neil Wood (b. 1963), who is based in Paris.

Macleod died of stomach cancer in 1963 at the age of 71.
