= Societat Catalana de Gnomònica =

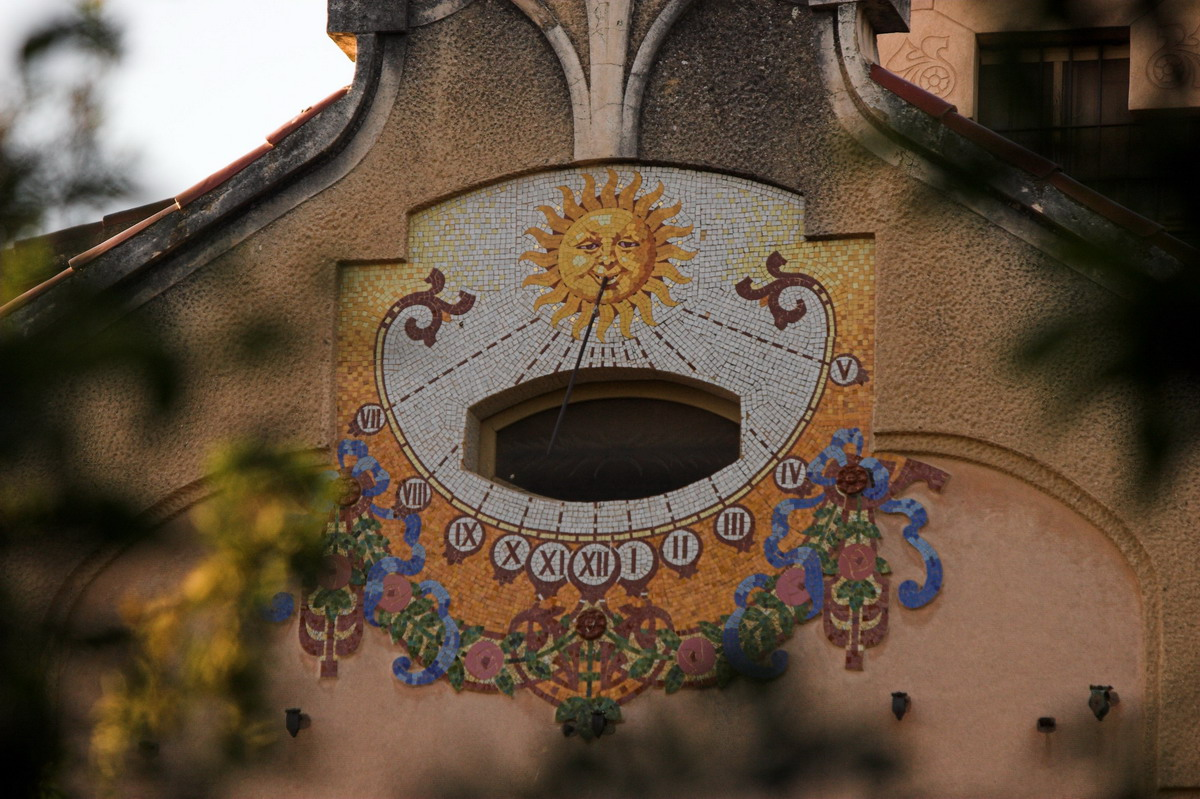
Casa Barbey sundial (La Garriga)

The Societat Catalana de Gnomónica (Catalan Gnomonic Society) is, among other cultural groups, a non-profit association that promotes all aspects of sundials.

One of the most interesting aspects of this association is the creation and conservation of an inventory of existing sundials in the Catalan Countries. The database is of free access and has about 7,300 references.

== Foundation ==
The Societat Catalana de Gnomónica (Association for the study of the sundial and the measurement of time) has been established since 1988 and is governed by the Statutes approved by the Generalitat of Catalonia and by Law 4/2008, of April 24, of the third book of the Civil Code of Catalonia, relative to legal persons. Register of Associations no. 10,463.

== Objectives ==
The association aspires to bring together everyone who is interested in the various aspects of the study and promotion of the techniques and arts related to Gnomonics and the measurement of time.

The fundamental objectives of this association are:

- Encourage the study and research of sundials and other instruments related to the measurement of time, promoting their construction, recovery and restoration, promoting the publication of publications on the subject (translations, monographs, newsletters, reissues, etc.)
- Promote exchange with other related associations, advising and collaborating with entities and organizations to carry out activities related to the objectives of the association, organizing and promoting such related activities, such as: conferences, meetings, courses, exchanges, contests, visits, travel, etc.

== Publications ==
- La Busca de Paper. - From the beginning, the SCG has published a newsletter based on the studies and activities carried out. (In summer 2021 there were 99 issues published). This publication is mentioned in numerous works on the subject.
- Rellotges de sol de Catalunya: a heritage to be discovered.
  - Sundials.
  - Solar quadrants.

== Database with 7000+ sundials ==
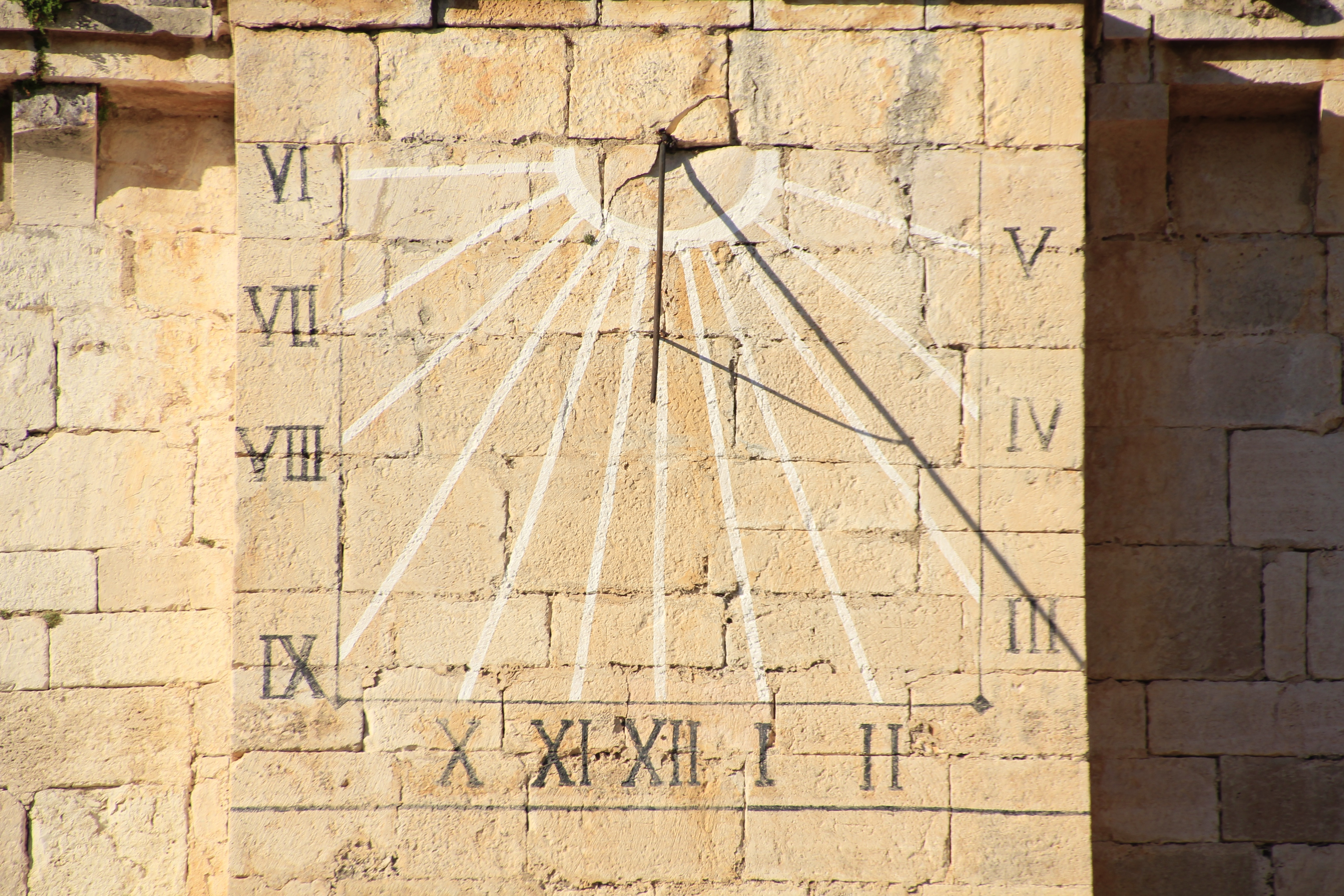
Sundial in the monastery of Santes Creus.

The association has created and maintains up to date a database of technical data sheets of more than 7000 sundials permanently installed in public spaces throughout Catalonia and Andorra. It is being used as a reference in the lists of sundials of the Catalan wikipedia for example in the sundial located in the monastery of Santes Creus.

== Sundial at the South Pole ==
With the patronage of the Societat Catalana de Gnomónica there is a sundial installed at the Amundsen-Scott Station.

== Similar associations ==
Throughout time there have been all kinds of entities that have promoted the construction of sundials and the conservation of existing ones. Apparently, however, the existence of specialized amateur societies exclusively in the gnomonic is very scarce.

- An official French entity is the Commission des Cadrans solaires, attached to the Société astronomique de France.
- 1988. Asociación Amigos Relojes de Sol (AARS), based in Madrid.
  - Analema magazine publication (1991-2005)
- 1994. Commission des Cadrans solaires du Québec, based in Quebec.
  - Publication Le Gnomiste.
- The ARCA Patrimonio (Asociación para la Revitalización de los Centros Antiguos de Mallorca) has a Sundial Commission.

== See also ==
- Royal Astronomical Society
- Sundial
- Gnomon
