= G. Scott MacLeod =

Canadian artist and filmmaker

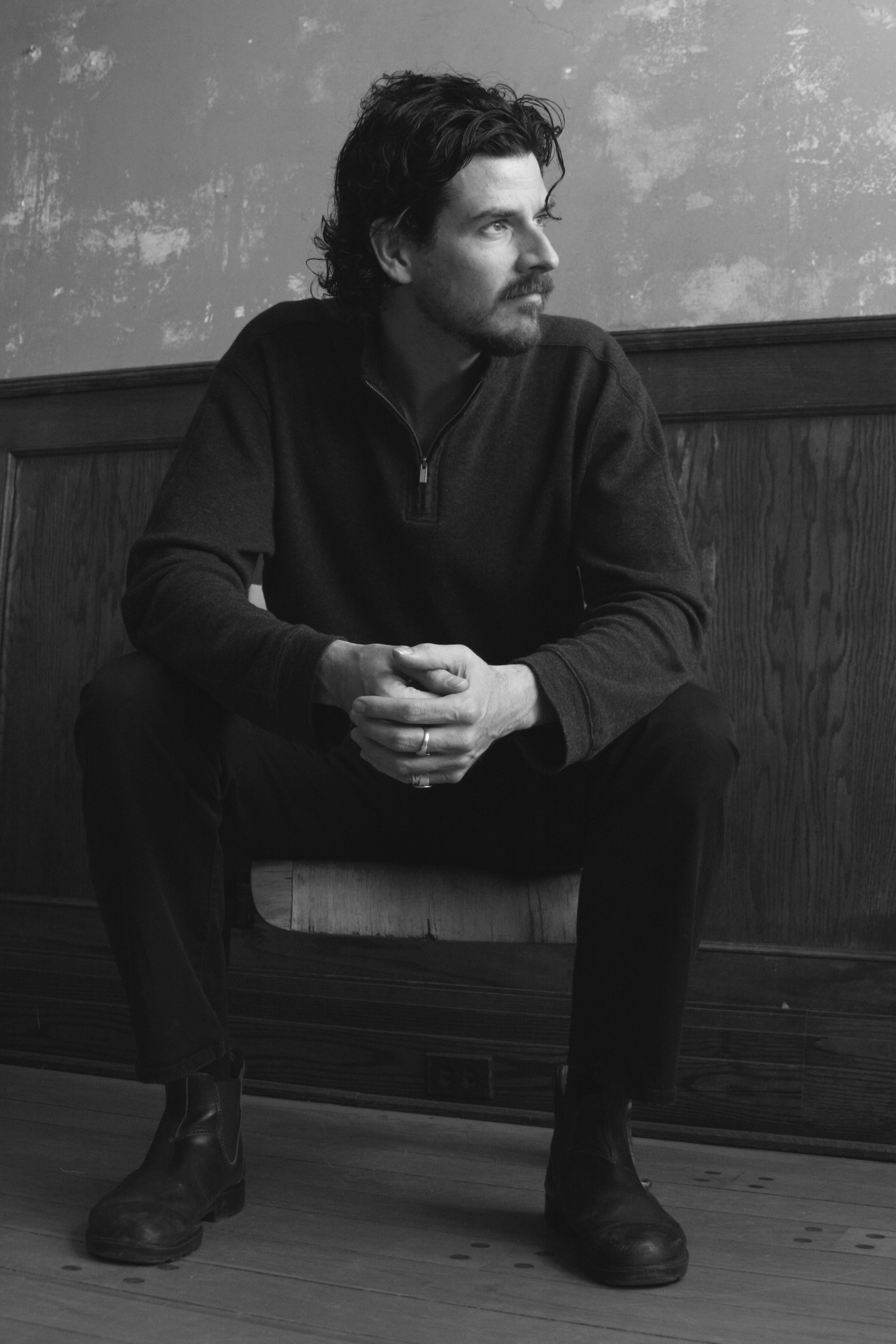
- Born: February 11, 1965 (age 61); Red Deer, Alberta, Canada
- Occupations: Artist, musician, film director
- Website: macleod9.com

G. Scott MacLeod (born February 11, 1965) is a Canadian multimedia artist, musician and film director living in Montreal, Quebec.

== Biography ==
G. Scott MacLeod was born in Red Deer, Alberta, Canada, in 1965. His family moved from Cape Breton, Nova Scotia to Montreal in 1969, where he was educated in both French and English. MacLeod received his Diploma of Collegial Studies in Fine Arts at John Abbott College in 1984, a BFA with a specialization in printmaking at Concordia University in 2003 and his Masters in Art Education at Concordia University in 2013. He is a fellow at The Helene Wurlitzer Foundation of New Mexico and a co-founder of the NDG Arts Week.

A critically acclaimed painter and photographer, MacLeod's work has reflected social, political and historical themes with an aim to promote education and accessibility to art and culture. His paintings and photographs are in many museums, as well as corporate and private collections. His drawings of prominent buildings in Montreal's Griffintown district were exhibited at the Centre d'Histoire de Montreal between September 2015 to August 2016. MacLeod made his first film, After the War with Hannelore - A Berliner War Child’s Testimony from 1945 to 1989, in 2009. The 22-minute documentary had several high-profile screenings, including at Les rendez-vous du cinéma québécois and Berlin’s Arnsenal 2 Institut für Film und Videokunst. He has since completed three films of The Water of Life animated film series, a four-part collaboration on Canadian history with Irish storyteller Mike Burns. MacLeod is also a singer-songwriter and recording artist. Since 1990, he has released three full-length LPs, three EPs and several singles. He also composed and performed the nine-song soundtrack for his first film.

== Bodies of work ==
=== Painting ===
- Owe Canada Owe Canada (1992)
- Black '47 Irish Famine (1993)
- Ancestral Homes (1999)
- Flying Hearts 1993–2000
- The Great Hunger 1995–1999
- Taos Memory Series 1996–2007
- Newfoundland and Avalon Peninsula Series 2005–2006
- Scottish Memory Series 2003–2005
- Ancestral Homes and Vinland Series 2000–2005
- Central Park and New York City 2003
- Lachine Canal Series 2003–2005
- Temples and Tombs 2005–2010
- New York City 2008
- Meeting with the Goddesses 2001–2014
- Iceland Series
- In Griffintown Series (2015)
- Lachine Canal Past and Present (2016)

=== Photography ===
G. Scott MacLeod's photographic work is known for his technique of panographic portraiture.

- Sacred Feminine and Masculine (2005)
- After the war with Hannelore (2006)
- Goddess and Gods/Contemporary Archetypes (2008)
- Goddess and Gods/Contemporary Archetypes (2008)

=== Film and video ===
- After the war with Hannelore - A Berliner war child's testimony from 1945 to 1989 (2009)
- The Saga of Murdo MacLeod and his first contact with the Abenaki (2012)
- Dans l'Griff In Griffintown (2013)
- The Abenaki People of the Dawn (2013)
- The Irishman - Child of the Gael (2014)
- The French Canadian (2015)
- The Water of Life Feature (2015)
- First Contact (2016)
- Griffintown Tour - The Death and Life of Griffintown: 21 short films (2017)

=== Music ===
- A Brief Canadian History (2000)
- The Closing of the 4th Cycle (2006)
- After the war with Hannelore Soundtrack (2009)

== Exhibits and collections ==
As a visual artist, MacLeod has had over 200 exhibitions and performances nationally and internationally. His work is featured in museums and in corporate and private collections. He has presented his work in Canada, Mexico, Germany, Ireland, Czech Republic, and the USA. His work has been collected by The National Gallery of Canada, Musée national des beaux-arts du Québec, Museo Nacional de la Estampa, Guinness Corporation, Air Canada, The Royal Bank of Canada, Pratt and Whitney, Reader’s Digest, Claridge, Velan Valves Inc., Brasserie McAuslan Brewing, London Life, CP Hotels, Loto Québec, Jewitt Morrison & Associates, ALDO, Senvest Collection, Dr. Jane Goodall and TV personality Rick Mercer.

== Education and affiliations ==
G. Scott MacLeod received his diploma of collegial studies in Fine Arts at John Abbott College in 1984, a BFA in specialization in printmaking at Concordia University in 2003 and a MA in Art Education at Concordia University in 2013. He attended the Banff Centre for the Arts in 1987 and 1992.

MacLeod is a member of RAAV, Montreal Film Group, Main Film, La Raza Group, and SAGAMIE. He is a fellow at The Helene Wurlitzer Foundation of New Mexico.

MacLeod is also an affiliate at the Centre for Oral History and Digital Storytelling at Concordia University.

== Publications ==
- 2016 – MacLeod, G. Scott. Grande, John K. Grande, John K. The Lachine Canal : Past and Present exhibition catalogue.
- 2015 – MacLeod, G. Scott. Contributor to 2015 edition of Business Skills for Creative Souls, YES Montreal.
- 2014 – MacLeod, G. Scott. Grande, John K. Meeting with the Goddesses, exhibition catalogue, painting and drawings by G. Scott MacLeod.
- 2013 – MacLeod, G. Scott. L’Abénaki – Peuple de l’Aube, The Abenaki- People of the Dawn, animation drawings by G. Scott MacLeod.
- 2013 – MacLeod, G. Scott. Dans l’Griff-In Griffintown: Three personal French Canadian narratives on their homes, public spaces, and buildings in the former industrial neighbourhood of Griffintown, March 17th.
- 2012 – MacLeod, G. Scott. (2012). After the War with Hannelore, Memory Work, A Heart of Wisdom: Life Writing as Empathetic Inquiry, Edited by Cynthia M. Chambers, Erika Hasebe-Ludt, Carl Leggo, Anita Sinner. Peter Lang Publishing, New York, p. 82–90.
- 2011 – MacLeod, G. Scott. Bauer, Judith. Griffintown: A Self Guided Urban History Walk, 21 sites of Griffintown. Photos and drawings by G. Scott MacLeod.
- 2010 – Millar, Joyce. La Raza Group: Full Circle, retrospective catalogue, Stewart Hall Gallery, Paintings by G. Scott MacLeod, Francis Caprani and Gerald Pedros.
- 2009 – MacLeod, G. Scott, Schade, Dr. Rosemarie. Friess, Hans-Joachim. After the war with Hannelore – A Berliner War Child’s testimony from 1945 to 1989, animation drawings by G. Scott MacLeod.
- 2009 – MacLeod, G. Scott, Grande, John K. Goddesses and Gods: Contemporary Archetypes, exhibition catalogue from SAGAMIE residency, photos by G. Scott MacLeod.
- 2008 – MacLeod, G. Scott, Grande, John K. Sacred Feminine and Masculine, Maison de la culture Mercier exhibition catalogue.
- 2008 – Grande, John K. Art Allsorts : Writings on art and artists, Go if press 2008, Commitment to Community p. 77–78, and Urban Realities, p. 78–79.
- 2007 – MacLeod, G. Scott, Grande, John K. Meeting with the Goddesses, paintings by G. Scott MacLeod, Berlin exhibition catalogue.
- 2006 – McBay, Arnold. Urban Realities, La Raza Group exhibition catalogue.
- 2005 – Sacred Feminine and Masculine, exhibition catalogue, St. Thomas-Elgin Public Art Centre, March 19 to May 7.
- 2004 – The Avmor Collection, 1965–2004 p. 40 and p. 124.
- 2000 – Avmor Celebrates the Millennium 2000, exhibition catalogue.
- 1999–2000 – Paquet, Bernard, One World Five Universes-Un Monde Cinq Univers, Art Gallery of Bishop’s University, exhibition catalogue.
- 1998 Grande, John K. "The Starving Can’t Eat Stone: Scott MacLeod", Intertwining, Chapter 21, p. 93.
- 1997 – Liss, David. Eight Montreal Artists in Prague, exhibition catalogue.
- 1995 – Grande, John K. The Starving Can’t Eat Stone, exhibition catalogue.
- 1991 – O’ Driscoll, Robert, Woodman, Marion. "Patriarchy and The Goddess", Exhibition catalogue.
- 1989 – ALCAN Biénnale de dessin de l’estampe et papier de Quebec catalogue, p. 58.
- 1989 – ELAAC, Entrée Libre à l’Art Contemporain, exhibition catalogue, p. 61.
