= Shane McLeod (journalist) =

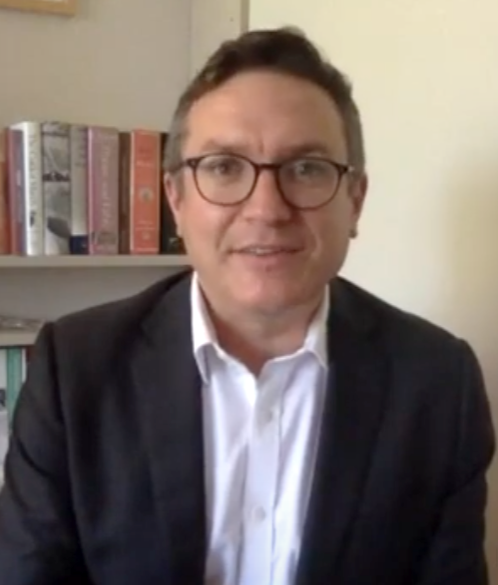
- McLeod in 2021
- Born: Shane David McLeod; 8 August 1975 (age 51)
- Education: Queensland University of Technology
- Occupation: Journalist

Shane David McLeod (born 8 August 1975) is the Australian Broadcasting Corporation's North Asia correspondent.

== Biography ==
McLeod grew up in Hervey Bay and studied journalism at Queensland University of Technology in Brisbane. He commenced his career at ABC's Brisbane radio newsroom and also worked in Gladstone, Longreach and Cairns before transferring to the radio current affairs Melbourne bureau in 1999 to report for the ABC's national programs AM, The World Today and PM.

A move in January 2001 took him to Australia's capital, Canberra, where he reported federal politics for radio current affairs, including the 2001 federal election campaign. In 2002 McLeod was promoted to the ABC's foreign correspondent in Papua New Guinea, reporting from across the pacific region. In January 2005 he reported on the devastating tsunami and its effects in Banda Aceh, Indonesia. He moved to Japan to become the ABC's North Asia correspondent in July 2005.
