= Mike McLeod (gridiron football) =

American gridiron football player (born 1958)

No. 18, 28
- Position: Safety

Personal information
- Born: May 4, 1958 (age 68); Bozeman, Montana, U.S.
- Listed height: 6 ft 0 in (1.83 m)
- Listed weight: 180 lb (82 kg)

Career information
- College: Montana State

Career history
- 1980–1984: Edmonton Eskimos
- 1984–1985: Green Bay Packers

Awards and highlights
- 3× Grey Cup champion (1980, 1981, 1982)
- Stats at Pro Football Reference

Michael James McLeod (born May 4, 1958) is a former safety in the Canadian Football League (CFL) and the National Football League (NFL).

== Career ==
He played at the collegiate level at Montana State University - Bozeman. While in college he was a member of the 1976 National Championship team. He was also a co-captain of the 1979 Big Sky Conference championship team and was inducted into the Montana State University Athletics Hall of Fame in 2003. After graduating, he also played 5 seasons with the Edmonton Eskimos of the Canadian Football League and was a member of 3 Grey Cup Championship teams. He joined the Green Bay Packers in early in the 1984 season after he left the Eskimos, and played 20 games for them in two seasons. He is currently the owner of McLeod Insurance and Financial Services, Inc. in Bozeman, Montana.
