= Malcolm MacLeod (British Army officer) =

British Army officer and surveyor (1882–1969)

Major-General Malcom MacLeod CB DSO MC
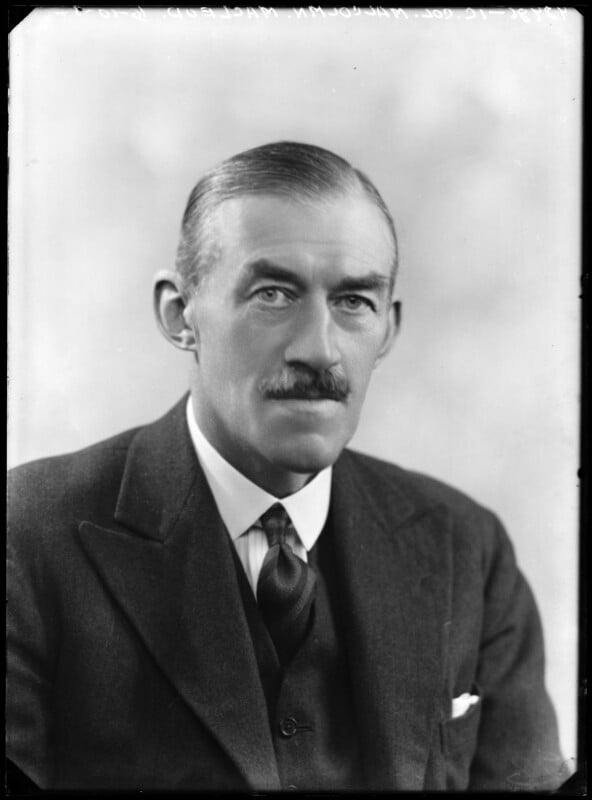
- MacLeod in 1934
- Born: 23 May 1882
- Died: 1 August 1969 (aged 87)
- Military career
- Allegiance: United Kingdom
- Branch: British Army
- Service years: 1900–1943
- Rank: Major-General
- Unit: Royal Engineers
- Commands: Ordnance Survey; 4th Field Survey Battalion
- Conflicts: First World War; Second World War
- Awards: Companion of the Order of the Bath; Distinguished Service Order; Military Cross; Mentioned in Despatches

Major-General Malcolm Neynoe MacLeod, CB, DSO, MC (23 May 1882 – 1 August 1969) was a senior British Army officer who served as Director General of the Ordnance Survey from 1935 to 1943.

In 1935, he started the retriangulation of Great Britain, an immense task that involved erecting concrete triangulation pillars (trig points) on prominent hilltops throughout Britain. As well as being an immense physical task, it was also a complex mathematical undertaking. MacLeod can fairly be said to be the creator of the Ordnance Survey in its modern form.

MacLeod was commissioned in the Royal Engineers in 1900, serving in India from 1902 until 1914. During the First World War, he commanded the 4th Field Survey Battalion and was awarded the Military Cross in the 1917 New Year Honours. He became Chief Instructor at the School of Artillery, Larkhill in 1920, serving until 1923 when he moved to the Ordnance Survey. After attending the Staff College, Quetta. he was Director-General of the Ordnance Survey in 1935, retiring in 1943.

== Bibliography ==
- Yolande Hodson, 2004, 'MacLeod, Malcolm Neynoe (1882–1969)', Oxford Dictionary of National Biography. Oxford: Oxford University Press.
- Smart, Nick (2005). Biographical Dictionary of British Generals of the Second World War. Barnesley: Pen & Sword. ISBN 1844150496.
