= Malcolm Macleod =

Scottish Neurologist

Malcolm Macleod (born in Edinburgh in 1965) is a Scottish neurologist and translational neuroscientist.

== Biography ==
Macleod spent his early years in Achiltibuie and Inverness. He attended the Leachkin Primary School, Jedburgh Grammar School and Loretto School, Musselburgh, before studying medicine at the University of Edinburgh. As an undergraduate he was President of Edinburgh University Students' Association. After graduation, he held a number of junior medical posts in Edinburgh and Forth Valley. He was Rector of the University of Edinburgh from 1994 to 1997, Secretary of the Labour Campaign for a Scottish Parliament, and a member of the National Executive of the Scotland FORward campaign, the cross party group which campaigned for a YES-YES vote in the 1997 devolution referendum.

From 1995 to 1998 he studied for a PhD at the University of Edinburgh, followed by 2 years in a post-doctoral position at the Seckl lab, before embarking on training in neurology. In 2003 he was Visiting Fellow at the National Stroke Research Institute in Melbourne, Australia.

His research interests are diverse and have included the development of effective treatments for acute ischaemic stroke; the optimal use of animal models of disease; the neurobiology of the mineralocorticoid receptor; and impact of social deprivation on the incidence and management of neurological diseases.

He is currently Professor of Neurology and Translational Neurosciences and Academic Lead for Research Improvement and Research Integrity at the University of Edinburgh, where he led the 2020University of Edinburgh Research Culture Survey. Since 2005 he has been Consultant Neurologist at Forth Valley Royal Hospital.

With Howells he co-founded the CAMARADES collaboration in 2005. He is Academic Coordinator of the European Quality in Preclinical Data IMI consortium. He was a lead author in the Lancet Series on Research Waste in 2014, and is a member of the UK Reproducibility Network steering committee and the UK MHRA Commission for Human Medicines. His current research interests relate to providing evidence for the effectiveness (or not) of strategies which might be adopted by funders, journals and institutions to improve the quality of their research.

Macleod was elected a Fellow of the Academy of Medical Sciences in 2022 and Fellow of the Royal Society of Edinburgh in 2024.

Academic offices
Preceded by Donnie Munro	Rector of the University of Edinburgh; 1994–1997	Succeeded by John Colquhoun
