= Old Rory =

Scottish chief (c.1500–c.1595)

Roderick Macleod (Modern Scottish Gaelic: Ruaraidh Macleòid, c. 1500–c. 1595), also known as Old Rory, was the chief of Clan Macleod of Lewes in the later half of the 16th century.

== Biography ==
Roderick was the son and heir of Malcolm, chieftain of Lewis, himself younger brother of the forfeited chieftain Torquil, whom the Scottish king had deposed in 1506.

Malcolm had re-acquired the ancestral dominions from the king in 1511, but when he died, his son Roderick was still underage, and Torquil's son John -with the assistance of Domhnall 'Gruamach' of Sleat (grandson and heir of Hugh of Sleat)- seized the whole Lewes inheritance. John's daughter and heiress Màiri had married Donald Gorm (Note: Gorm is Gaelic for blue or dark green) of Sleat (son of Domhnall Gruamach). Roderick, on the other hand, claimed the succession as male heir.

An agreement was reached between Donald Gorm and Roderick Melkolmson, whereby Roderick was allowed to enter into possession of the Isle of Lewis, and in return Roderick became bound to assist in putting Donald Gorm in possession of Trotternish, and help against all the efforts of the chief of Harris-Dunvegan (Note: Donald Gorm had hoped to ultimately force the re-establishment of the extinct Lordship of the Isles; except for the long-imprisoned claimant Domhnall Dubh, Donald Gorm was the heir male to that Lordship). In 1539, however, Donald Gorm was killed while besieging Eilean Donan. Thus, when the powerful fleet of King James V arrived at the isle of Lewis in around 1540, the rebellion totally collapsed. Nevertheless, Roderick was pardoned for his treasonable actions by the king.

It is clear, though, that he and his clan continued to act independently of the Scottish government. In 1554, Letters of Fire and Sword were issued for the extermination of Roderick of The Lewes, John Moydertach of Clan Ranald and Donald Gorm's son (Donald Gormson MacDonald of Sleat) after they all refused to attend parliament at Inverness.

The fall of the clan and loss of the Isle of Lewis, began with Roderick's marital difficulties and the subsequent disastrous feuds it incurred.

His first wife was Siobhan, a daughter of Iain Mackenzie of Kintail. This woman had produced a son named Torcuil 'Connanach' (named after his residence among the Mackenzies in Strathconon). Roderick disowned Torcuil Connanach on account of alleged adultery between his wife and the Morrison brieve of Lewis. Siobhan later abandoned him and eloped with a cousin of his, John MacGillechallum of Raasay, after which Roderick divorced her. In that way, Roderick provided a pretext for a disastrous feud which led to the death or exile of all his intended male heirs and saw Lewis fall into the hands of the Mackenzies.

In 1541, Roderick took for his second wife, the widowed Barbara Stewart from Orkney, daughter of Andrew, Lord Avondale, and by this lady had a son, likewise named Torquil, and surnamed Oighre (the Heir, to distinguish him from the disowned Torcuil). About 1566, the younger Torquil was drowned along with sixty attendants in a storm while sailing from Lewis to Skye across The Minch.

Torcuil Connanach immediately took up arms for what he conceived to be his rights. In this, he was supported by the Mackenzies. He captured his supposed father, the old lord Roderick, and for the next four years kept him as prisoner under dreadful conditions within the castle of Stornoway. Roderick was only released from captivity by agreeing to recognise Torcuil Connanach as his lawful heir. In 1572, Roderick was brought before the Privy Council, where he was forced to resign to the Crown his lands of Lewis, Assynt, Coigach and Waternish. These lands were then granted to Torcuil Connanach as his lawful heir, and he only received them back in life-rent. When Roderick returned to Lewis, however, he renounced all he had agreed to on the grounds of coercion on 2 June 1572. Later in 1576, Regent Morton was successful in reconciling Roderick and Connanach, where Connanach was again made lawful heir and also received charter to the lands of Coigach.

Roderick took for his third wife, a sister of Sir Lachlan Mor Maclean, and had by her two sons, named Torquil 'Dubh' and Tormod. He made Torquil Dubh his heir. Having again been disinherited, Torcuil Connanach once more took up arms, and was supported by two illegitimate sons of Roderick. He captured Roderick and killed a number of his men. All the charters and title deeds of the Lewis were carried off by Connanach, and handed over to the Mackenzies. The charge of the castle of Stornoway, with the chief a prisoner in it, was committed to Iain, the son of Connanach, but he was attacked by Lewis troops and killed. Freed, Roderick possessed the island in peace for the remainder of his life.

== Aftermath ==
On his death, Roderick was succeeded by his son, Torquil Dubh, who married a sister of Sir Roderick Macleod of Harris and Dunvegan. In 1596, Torquil Dubh, with a force of seven or eight hundred men, devastated Torcuil Connanach's lands of Coigach and the Mackenzie lands of Lochbroom. In consequence, Torquil Dubh was summoned to appear before the Privy Council and was declared a rebel when he failed to appear. He was by stratagem apprehended by the brieve of Lewis, chief of the Morrisons of Ness, and carried to the lands of the Mackenzies, into the presence of Lord Kintail, who ordered Torquil Dubh and his companions to be beheaded. This took place in July 1597.

The dissensions in Lewis, followed by the forfeiture of that island in consequence of the non-production of the title-deeds (held by the Mackenzies), as required by the Act of Estates of 1597, afforded the king an opportunity to try an abortive project of colonisation of Lewis. The colonists were in the end compelled to abandon their enterprise.

After the death of Roderick, the Sleat chieftains, heirs to Màiri, the daughter of John, regarded themselves heirs of the deceased chiefs of Lewis and invaded the island pursuing their claim, although Torquil Dubh had left legitimate sons. It was not until after causing much destruction that the MacDonald of Sleat chief was driven off the island by the men of Lewis.
