= Innes Chonnel Castle =

Ruined 13th-century castle in western Scotland

Coordinates: 56.2568°N 5.2675°W

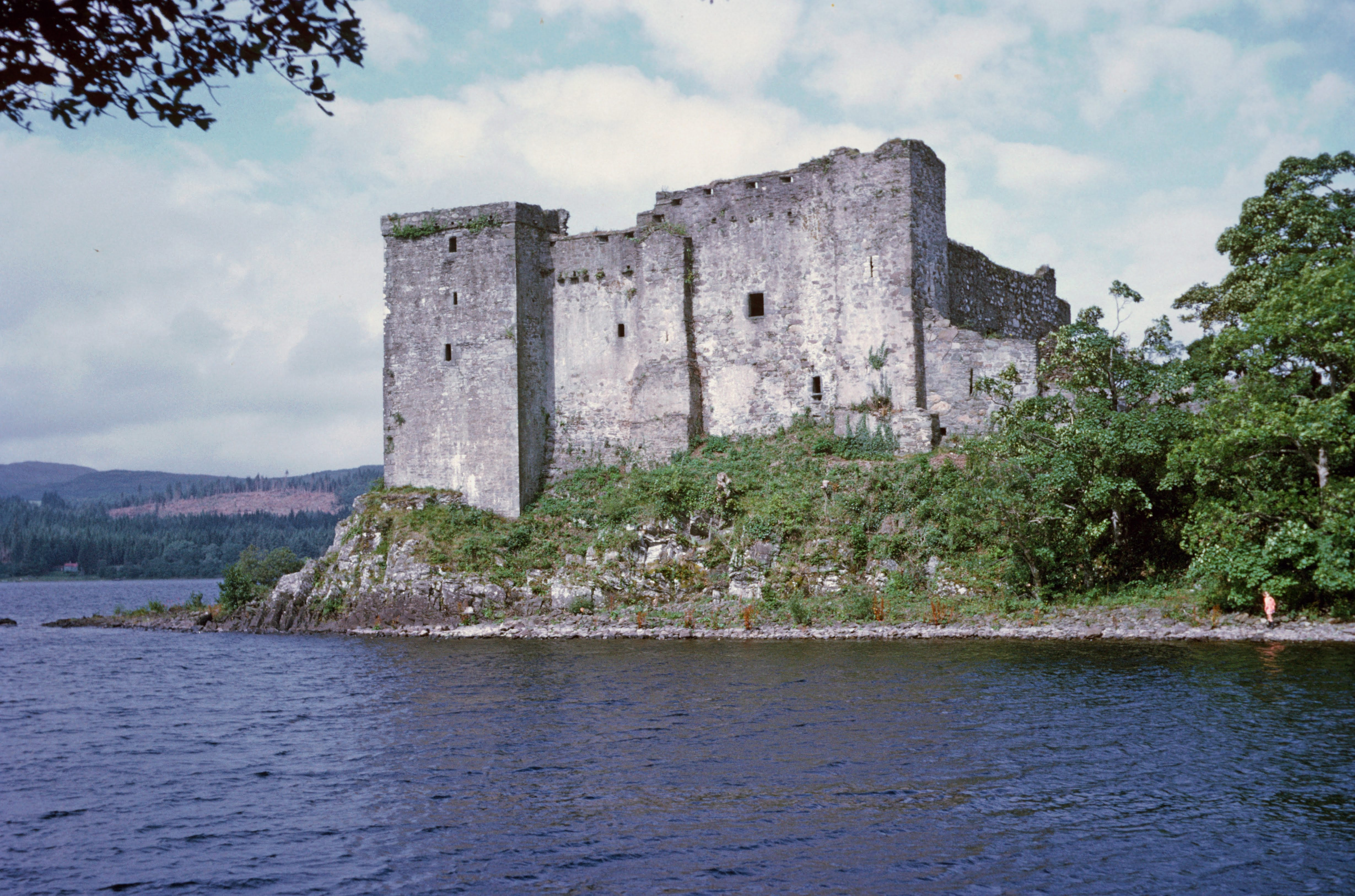
- The castle in 1969

Location
- Shown within Scotland

Site history
- Built: 13th century

Innes Chonnel Castle or Ardchonnel Castle is a ruined 13th-century castle on Innis Chonnell, an island on Loch Awe near Dalavich, Argyll and Bute, Scotland. The fortress was once a stronghold of Clan Campbell.

The castle and the island are jointly a designated scheduled monument.

== History ==
The castle that stands on the wooded island of Innis Chonnell has thick outer walls. It was the original stronghold of the Clan Campbell from possibly the eleventh century or earlier. It was the seat of Cailean Mór (Sir Colin Campbell) who was killed fighting the Clan MacDougall at the Battle of Red Ford in 1296. Later, John MacDougall held the castle against Robert the Bruce in 1308. Sir Colin Campbell's son, Sir Neil Campbell, married Bruce's sister, Mary, and Sir Neil fought for the Bruce at the Battle of Bannockburn in 1314. Innis Chonnel Castle was abandoned by the Campbells as their residence in the fifteenth century, but it was still used as a prison. The young Domhnall Dubh ("Black Donald"), son of Aonghas Óg (Angus) and heir to the Lordship of the Isles, was imprisoned in the castle after the Battle of Bloody Bay, which took place off the coast of the Isle of Mull in 1484. He escaped but after invading Badenoch in 1503, he was recaptured and imprisoned in Edinburgh Castle for forty years. Innis Chonnell Castle was in ruins by the nineteenth century.
