= William Dubh MacLeod =

Scottish clan chief (c. 1415 – 1480)

- Born: c. 1415
- Died: 1480 (aged 64–65) near Tobermory, Mull
- Cause of death: killed at the Battle of Bloody Bay
- Resting place: Iona
- Known for: The 7th Chief of Clan MacLeod
- Predecessor: Iain Borb (father)
- Successor: Alasdair Crotach (son)
- Spouse: two wives
- Children: one son, and at least one daughter

William Dubh MacLeod (Scottish Gaelic: Uilleam Dubh MacLeòid) (c. 1415–1480) is considered to be the 7th Chief of Clan MacLeod. He is thought to have been a younger son, yet because of the death of his elder brother, William Dubh succeeded his father, Iain Borb, in the year 1442. William Dubh was an old man when he was killed, leading his clan, at the Battle of Bloody Bay in 1480. He was the last MacLeod chief to be buried on the island of Iona. He was succeeded by his son, Alasdair Crotach.

== Life ==
=== Succession ===
According to early 20th-century clan historian R.C. MacLeod, William Dubh was born in about the year 1415. He was the son of the MacLeod chief Iain Borb. The Bannatyne manuscript records that Iain Borb married a granddaughter of the Earl of Douglas—several 20th-century clan historians gave her name as Margaret. The couple had two sons, named William and Norman (Tormod), as well as two daughters. The manuscript maintains that Norman was the elder of the brothers, but that he died young and left a son who was too young to succeed to the chiefship. In fact, William was the son that succeeded Iain Borb as chief; MacLeods states that this happened in the year 1442. In MacLeod's opinion, the fact that the clan accepted William Dubh as chief, and not guardian, was evidence that William was in fact the elder brother. Later in the 20th century, A. Morrison stated that Norman was probably an illegitimate son of Iain Borb and that he was considerably older than William, since Norman led the clan in battle in 1428. According to 20th-century clan historians Morrison and D. Mackinnon, William Dubh was known as "Long Sword".

=== Clan conflicts ===
William Dubh and his kinsman, Roderick MacLeod of Lewis, are recorded as witnesses to a charter granted by John MacDonald, Earl of Ross, Lord of the Isles, to his brother Hugh MacDonald of Sleat, dated on 28 June 1449. According to MacVurich, the Sleat shenachie, William Dubh ('William MacLeod of Harris') accompanied Hugh and other "young gentlemen of the Isles" on a raiding expedition to Orkney. The tradition runs that the Western Islesmen were victorious in their conflict with the Northern Islesmen and that the Earl of Orkney was also slain. Hugh is then said to have ravaged Orkney, and carried off much loot. According to early 20th-century clan historians A. Macdonald and A. Macdonald, this expedition took place around the year 1460.

In the late 15th century, Angus Og MacDonald, bastard son of John MacDonald, Earl of Ross, Lord of the Isles, attempted to depose his father. Angus was supported by all the branches of Clan Donald, as well as the MacLeods of Lewis. However, other island clans, such as the MacLeods of Harris and Dunvegan, the MacLeans and the MacNeils, supported John. The Bannatyne manuscript states that the opposing clans fought skirmishes throughout the Hebrides. One such skirmish took place on Skye between the MacDonalds and MacLeods when a large force of MacDonalds, led by "Evan MacKail", son of the chief of Clanranald, landed at Aird Bay with the intention of laying waste to MacLeod territory. At this time William Dubh was away and his only son, Alasdair, rallied the clan's forces and marched them towards the MacDonalds, who were encamped near their galleys. The opposing forces clashed with each other and Alasdair was wounded in the back by Evan MacKail, who swung with a battle axe. As Alasdair fell to the ground he grabbed Evan MacKail and killed him with a dirk and cut off the dead man's head as a trophy. The battle ended with the defeat of the MacDonalds, who lost most of their men, and ten galleys. The manuscript dates from about the 1830s and states that there were heaps of bones and skulls which could still be seen where the battle of was said to have taken place.

These skirmishes led to the final encounter at the Battle of Bloody Bay in 1480. In this conflict, The Bannatyne manuscript states that William Dubh was killed early on, and at the fall of their chief, the MacLeods began to give way. However, a priest named Callum Clerich made the keeper of the Fairy Flag unfurl his banner. The manuscript states that when the MacLeod's kinsmen, the MacLeods of Lewis, switched sides upon seeing the sacred flag unfurled and joined the forces supporting John. However, the fate of the battle was already decided and the forces of Angus won the day. A large number of the clan was killed during the conflict, including the bearer of the flag, Murcha Beach, as well as the twelve men who were tasked with the flag's protection. William Dubh's body was taken to the island of Iona to be buried with those of his predecessors. The body of Murcha Breac was placed in the same tomb his—the Bannatyne manuscript states that this was the highest honour which could be disposed upon his remains. William Dubh was the last MacLeod chief to be buried on Iona.

=== Resting place ===
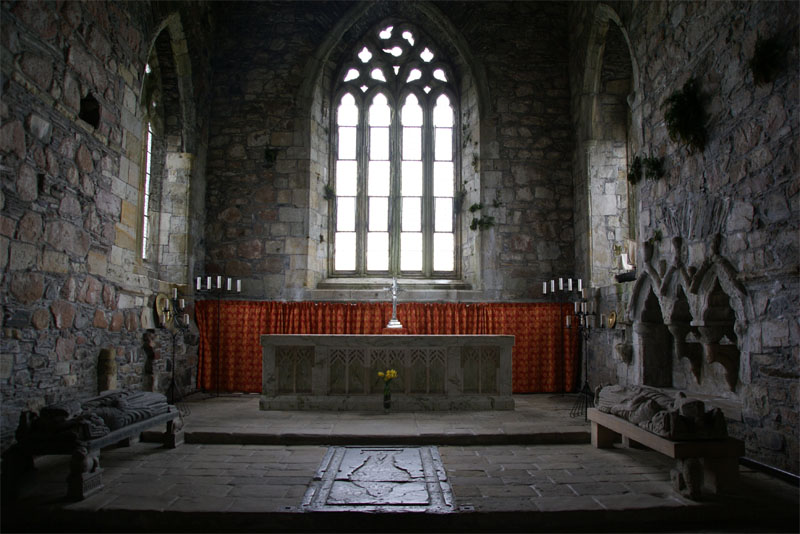
The choir of Iona Abbey. The stone said to represent a MacLeod is visible on the floor in the middle. The effigy on the left (north) is of a Mackinnon, the one on the right is a Mackenzie.

The Bannatyne manuscript states that the first seven chiefs of Clan MacLeod were buried at Iona. The choir of Iona Abbey, for the most part, dates from the early 16th century. Within the centre of the choir there is a large stone which once contained a monumental brass, traditionally said to have been a MacLeod. The stone formed a matrix which at one time contained the brass inlay (tradition states it was a silver inlay). It is the largest carved stone on the island, measuring 7 feet 9.25 inches (2.37 m) by 3 feet 10 inches (1.17 m). R.C. MacLeod speculated that perhaps the clan's founder, Leod, and five of his successors were buried beneath—however, in his opinion the fourth chief, Iain Ciar, was buried elsewhere.

== Family ==
The 20th-century clan historians Morrison and MacKinnon stated that William Dubh's first wife was a cousin of his, a daughter of John Maclaine, third chief of Clan Maclaine of Lochbuie. The late 19th-century clan historian A.M. Sinclair, stated that she was the daughter of Murdoch Maclaine, 2nd chief of Clan Maclaine of Lochbuie. Following the death of his first wife, William Dubh then married Anne, daughter of Ranald Ban MacDonald of Moydart and Clanranald. After William Dubh's death, Anne married her cousin, Hector Roy Mackenzie, 1st of Gairloch.

William Dubh had one son, Alasdair Crotach, who succeeded him on his death. Morrison and MacKinnon stated that his son was a product of his first marriage and that William Dubh also had two daughters—one from each of his two wives. The 19th-century historian A. Mackenzie only gave one daughter to William Dubh and stated she married Lachlan MacLean of Duart.

== See also ==
- Battle of Bloody Bay, a battle fought between numerous west Highland clans, where William Dubh was killed
- Fairy flag, a Clan MacLeod heirloom said to have magical powers, and said to have been unfurled at the Battle of Bloody Bay
