= Dubh's Rebellion =

Dubh's Rebellion refers to a series of conflicts in which Scottish nobleman Domhnall Dubh (also called "Black Donald") revolted against the rule of various Scottish monarchs. Fought from 1501–1505 and in 1545, the rebellions ended with the Scottish Crown crushing the rebels. The conflicts marked the end of several attempts to restore the independence of the Scottish Isles.

== Description ==
=== First rebellion ===
Following his ascension to the throne of Scotland in 1488, King James IV embarked on a campaign to consolidate his rule over the country. One year after being crowned king, he intervened in a conflict against Aonghas Óg, a noble of Clan Donald who was revolting against the rule of his father, John of Islay. James' support for John came too late, and in 1489 Aonghas defeated his father to become the head of Clan Donald and lord of the Scottish Isles.

Though his ally had been defeated, James used the clan dispute as an opportunity to exert its authority over the isles and invaded. Before fighting could begin in earnest, Aonghas was assassinated, allowing for James and his allies to easily gain control over the Scottish Isles. Using the crushed rebellion as a pretext, James asserted personal control over the region by personally claiming the title of Lord of the Isles in 1493. In doing so, James replaced Clan Donald as the major geopolitical force in the region. Aonghas' son young son Donald Dubh was captured during the conflict and imprisoned by Colin Campbell, 1st Earl of Argyll.

Nearly a decade after James' victory over Clan Donald, Og's son Donald Dubh escaped captivity with the help of Torquil MacLeod and revolted against the Scottish Crown, seeking to restore his clan's control over the islands and reclaim the title of Lord of the Isles. His initially rebellion lasted from 1501 to 1505, and saw Donald gain some territory before being defeated and recaptured. Dubh would remain imprisoned until 1543, when he was released. During the intervening years, the Scottish Crown officially annexed the Scottish Isles, declaring them personal lands of the Crown and establishing military garrisons in the region. These actions angered many of the Islanders, who viewed this loss of autonomy as an overreach of the Crown's power.

=== Second rebellion ===
Upon being released, Donald Dubh sought to assert his control over Clan Donald and the Scottish Isles. Coordinating a network of various clans and Scottish nobles, he and large parts of the Scottish isles revolted against the Scottish Crown, which was controlled by regents for the young Mary, Queen of Scots. Dubh was promised military and financial support by Henry VIII of England, who was hoping to force the Scottish Crown to form a Political Union with England by military action and war now known as the Rough Wooing.

Dubh secured his alliance with England on 5 August 1545, swearing allegiance to Henry VIII and acknowledging the Earl of Lennox as the true regent of Scotland (rather than Regent Arran or Mary of Guise). The rebellion was also supported by members of the Irish nobility that were aligned with Henry. Dubh and his allies chose to launch their invasion of Scotland while camped in Ireland, where they were pledged support by the local nobility.

With the rebellion having begun, Dubh promised to raise 8,000 men and 180 galleys to fight against the Scottish Crown. His force—which was still camped in Ireland, awaiting the right time to invade the Scottish Isles—was planned to be supplemented by 2,000 men provided by Henry and his Irish allies. Combined, this force outnumbered the Scottish Royal forces. However, the rebel's numbers remained hypothetical; Dubh was unable to gather the full support of the Scottish Isles, and Henry's Irish allies were unprepared to raise the 2,000 men he promised. Disputes over payments also led to divisions opening in the allied army. Instead of the 10,000 man force expected to invade, the army that sailed for Scotland numbered some 2,000 men. This force failed to make any major territorial gains, and Dubh retreated to Ireland in late 1545, where he died of a fever.

With the death of the rebellion's leader, the various rebels fighting in the Scottish isles either subsided or lost all coordination. In the period of infighting that followed, the Scottish Crown and its allies were able to restore royal control over the islands. The failure of Dubh's Rebellion marked the end of any attempts to restore the Scottish Isles' independence.
