= Alasdair Crotach MacLeod =

Scottish clan chief

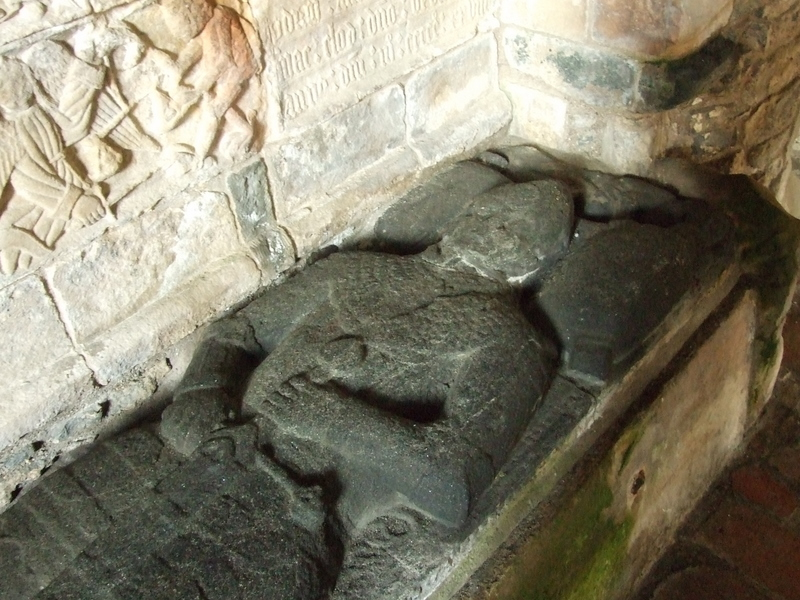
- Alasdair Crotach's effigy in the Church of St Clement, on Harris
- Born: 1450
- Died: 1547 (aged 96–97)
- Resting place: Church of St Clement, Rodel, Harris
- Title: The 8th Chief of Clan MacLeod
- Predecessor: William Dubh (father)
- Successor: William (son)
- Children: 1 son; 1 natural son; 2 daughters

Alasdair Crotach MacLeod (Scottish Gaelic: Alasdair Crotach MacLeòid) (1450 – 1547) is considered to be the 8th Chief of Clan MacLeod. He was the son of the 7th Chief of Clan MacLeod, William Dubh, and succeeded his father in 1480, following William Dubh's death at the Battle of Bloody Bay. He was the first MacLeod chief not to be buried on the island of Iona.

The Scottish Gaelic word crotach means "humpbacked" and the nickname refers to wounds he received during battle which crippled him the rest of his life. Alasdair Crotach's tomb is one of the most magnificently carved tombs of its era in Scotland. He was succeeded by his son, William.

== Life ==
=== Alasdair the Humpbacked ===
Alasdair Crotach was the son of William Dubh, 7th Chief of Clan MacLeod. The Scottish Gaelic word crotach means "humpbacked". According to MacLeod tradition, Alasdair earned this nickname during a pitched battle in which he was severely wounded. In the late 15th century, Angus Og MacDonald, bastard son of John MacDonald, Earl of Ross, Lord of the Isles, attempted to depose his father. Angus was supported by all the branches of Clan Donald, as well as the MacLeods of Lewis. However, other island clans, such as the MacLeods of Harris and Dunvegan, the MacLeans, and the MacNeils, supported John. The Bannatyne manuscript states that the opposing clans fought skirmishes throughout the Hebrides. One such skirmish took place on Skye between the MacDonalds and MacLeods when a large force of MacDonalds, led by "Evan MacKail", son of the chief of Clanranald, landed at Aird Bay with the intention of laying waste to MacLeod territory. At this particular time, William Dubh was away and his only son, Alasdair, rallied the clan's forces and marched them towards the MacDonalds who were encamped near their galleys. The opposing forces clashed with each other and Alasdair was wounded in the back by Evan MacKail, who wielded a battle axe. As the wounded Alasdair fell, he grabbed hold of Evan MacKail and brought him to the ground as well. Alasdair then killed MacKail with his dirk and cut off the dead man's head as a trophy. The battle ended with the defeat of the MacDonalds, who lost most of their men and ten galleys. The writer of the manuscript states that at the time of writing (about the 1830s), there were heaps of skulls and bones which could still be seen where the battle was said to have taken place.

=== Chief of the clan ===
MacLeod tradition preserved within the 19th century Bannatyne manuscript written by Bannatyne William MacLeod 10th of Glendale (1790-1856) states that Alasdair Crotach succeeded to the chiefship following his father's death at the Battle of Bloody Bay in 1480. Angus later followed up on this victory and had a force invade the MacLeod lands of Trotternish. In consequence, Duntulm Castle was taken from the MacLeods by surprise and the clan never repossessed the fortress. According to the Bannatyne manuscript, in about the year 1490, the MacDonalds attacked the MacLeods again—in what is known as the Battle of Glendale. However, the historian J. L. Roberts considered it likely that several battles were confused in MacLeod tradition; and that the battle fought at Glendale was fought at a much later date than which MacLeod tradition records. Roberts proposed that the MacDonalds could have landed on the north-west coast of Skye, following Alasdair's seizure of Dunscaith Castle after the year 1513; and that the opposing forces could have met and done battle at Glendale. Roberts noted that Alasdair later received a lease to the lands of Trotternish, from the Crown. These lands had been held at various times by Torquil MacLeod of Lewis and Ranald Ban MacDonald of Clanranald. For example, A. and A. Macdonald stated that in June 1498, the king granted Alasdair many lands on Skye, among them were two unciates of the barony of Trotternish along with the office of bailiary for these lands. In October of the same year, the king then granted the same office of bailiary of Trotternish, to Torquil MacLeod of Lewis. Roberts stated that in 1528, Donald Gruamach joined forces with his half-brother, John MacLeod, eldest son of Torquil MacLeod of Lewis; together the half-brothers drove Alasdair out of Trotternish.

Alasdair was recorded as a tenant of the Crown in Trotternish. In 1542 he received a Crown charter of Trotternish, Sleat, and North Uist. However, R. C. MacLeod stated that he did not believe that Alasdair ever really possessed these lands (except the two unce-lands of Trotternish, which his grandson exchanged for Waternish in 1610). MacLeod noted that during the 15th century, the MacLeods lost about half of their ancient lands: the part of North Uist was ceded by chief Iain Borb in 1406; Sleat was lost in about 1435; and as noted above, during the tenure of Alasdair, Trotternish was lost in about 1482.

=== Hebridean anarchy; massacre on Eigg ===
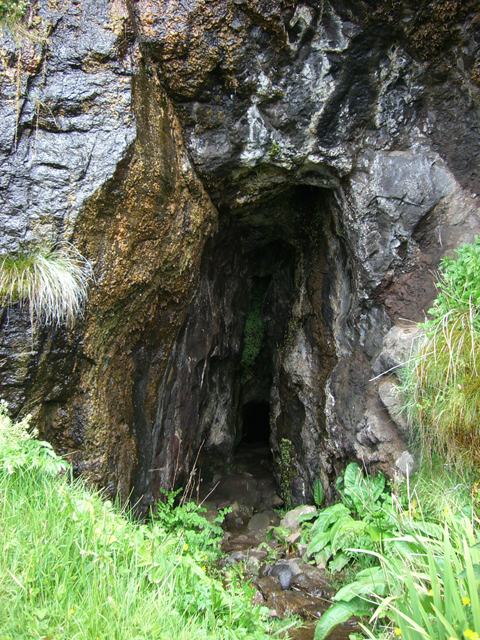
Entrance to Massacre Cave on Eigg. The entire population of the island was massacred in cold blood by the MacLeods. Almost 400 MacDonalds were said to have been smothered to death within.

The Bannatyne manuscript states that while the Western Isles were now nominally under the direct rule of the Scottish Crown, that the chiefs took the law into their own hands and in consequence anarchy descended across the West Highlands and Isles. The manuscript states that the most vicious acts were carried out between the MacLeods and MacDonalds of Clanranald. The manuscript gives several examples of feuding between the clans. One such example is a story of a birlinn which was driven ashore on the island of Eigg. The crew were refused provisions and in consequence they slaughtered some local livestock to sustain themselves. The locals then put the majority of the crew to death and set three others to sea, where they miraculously washed ashore on Skye. When Alasdair Crotach heard of the treatment of the crew he swore he would not change his clothes until every soul on the islands of Eigg, Rum, and Canna was put to death. The chief ordered six large galleys to be made ready, and together with his son, William, and several hundred armed men, sailed for the Small Isles. The inhabitants of the islands knew the intentions of the MacLeods and attempted to escape their fury by hiding themselves in a large cave on Eigg. When the MacLeods reached the island they waited for three days before discovering the cave and the inhabitants within.

The manuscript states that Alasdair Crotach was a religious man; so before the massacre of all the local inhabitants, he prayed for six hours incessantly. Before his prayers, he declared that if the wind was blowing off mouth of the cave at the end of the six hours, then the people should be spared; however, if the wind was blowing on the mouth of the cave, they should be put to death. While Alasdair Crotach prayed, the wind blew sideways across the mouth of the cave, but at the last moment it shifted to blowing hard upon the mouth of the cave. Alasdair Crotach took this as a sign from heaven and ordered the massacre. The manuscript claims that he then sailed to Skye and left actual killing to his son, William, who collected all the combustible material he could find and set it alight and smothered everyone within the cave. The manuscript states that 395 MacDonalds died within and that their remains were still there (in about the 1830s). For his part in the massacre, William was afterwards known as 'William of the Cave'. The massacre was reported to James VI, to have taken place in the year 1577, but this would put the event years after Alasdair Crotach's death. Roberts noted that MacLeod tradition dates the massacre to about the year 1510. MacLeod considered that this event may date to the years between 1502 and 1520. Roberts thought it dated to the reign of James V, or to the time just after his death.

The cave is known in English as the Massacre Cave, it is called in Scottish Gaelic Uamh Fhraing ("Frances's Cave"). It is located at grid reference NM47498352. Sir Walter Scott is said to have visited the site and discovered bones there in 1814, taking away a souvenir with him. A human skull, found within by a boy on holiday, was handed over to Birmingham Museum in 1979. The skull was verified to be human by the coroner; it was stated to be quite old and that of a child, aged about five or six years old.

=== Later life ===
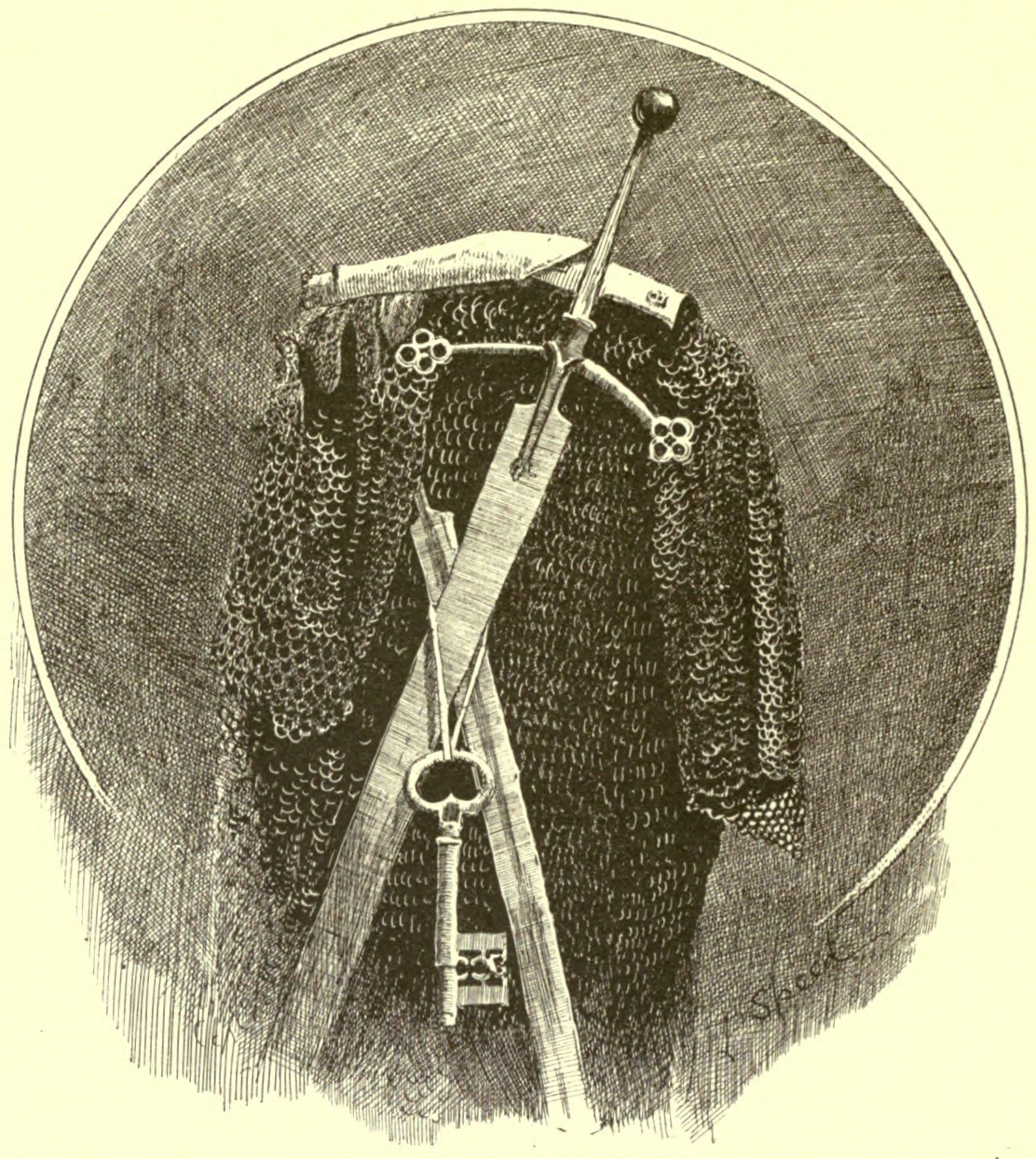
Rory Mor's claymore.

Years before his death, Alasdair Crotach gave up the leadership of the clan to his son, William. He then retired to the monastery of Rodel, on Harris. He endowed the monastery with lands and restored the church. He also built two churches, one at Nic Caperrall close to Toe Head, and one in Scarpa, an island off Loch Resort on the west side of North Harris. MacLeod stated that both were now in ruins. Alasdair Crotach also had work done on Dunvegan Castle, where he built a tower which is known by his name.

The Bannatyne manuscript states that Alasdair Crotach formed a college of pipers on Skye. He was a man of culture, and employed a number of harpers, bards and shenachies. The manuscript claims that few could wield his claymore and MacLeod proposed that the claymore kept at Dunvegan Castle, which is called 'Rory Mor's claymore', may actually be that of Alasdair Crotach. (Note: Rory Mor was Alasdair Crotach's grandson and one of the most distinguished chiefs of his time.) MacLeod stated that the sword had been dated to the about the year 1460—which is roughly the time when Alasdair Crotach would have been a young man.

MacLeod stated that Alasdair Crotach died in 1547. He was buried within a tomb inside St Clement's Church, Rodel, on Harris. The tomb is one of the most richly carved tombs in Scotland of its period. The tomb dates to 1528, about two decades before Alasdair Crotach's death. He was the first MacLeod chief to be buried on Harris, his predecessors are all said to have been buried on the island of Iona.

== Family and issue ==
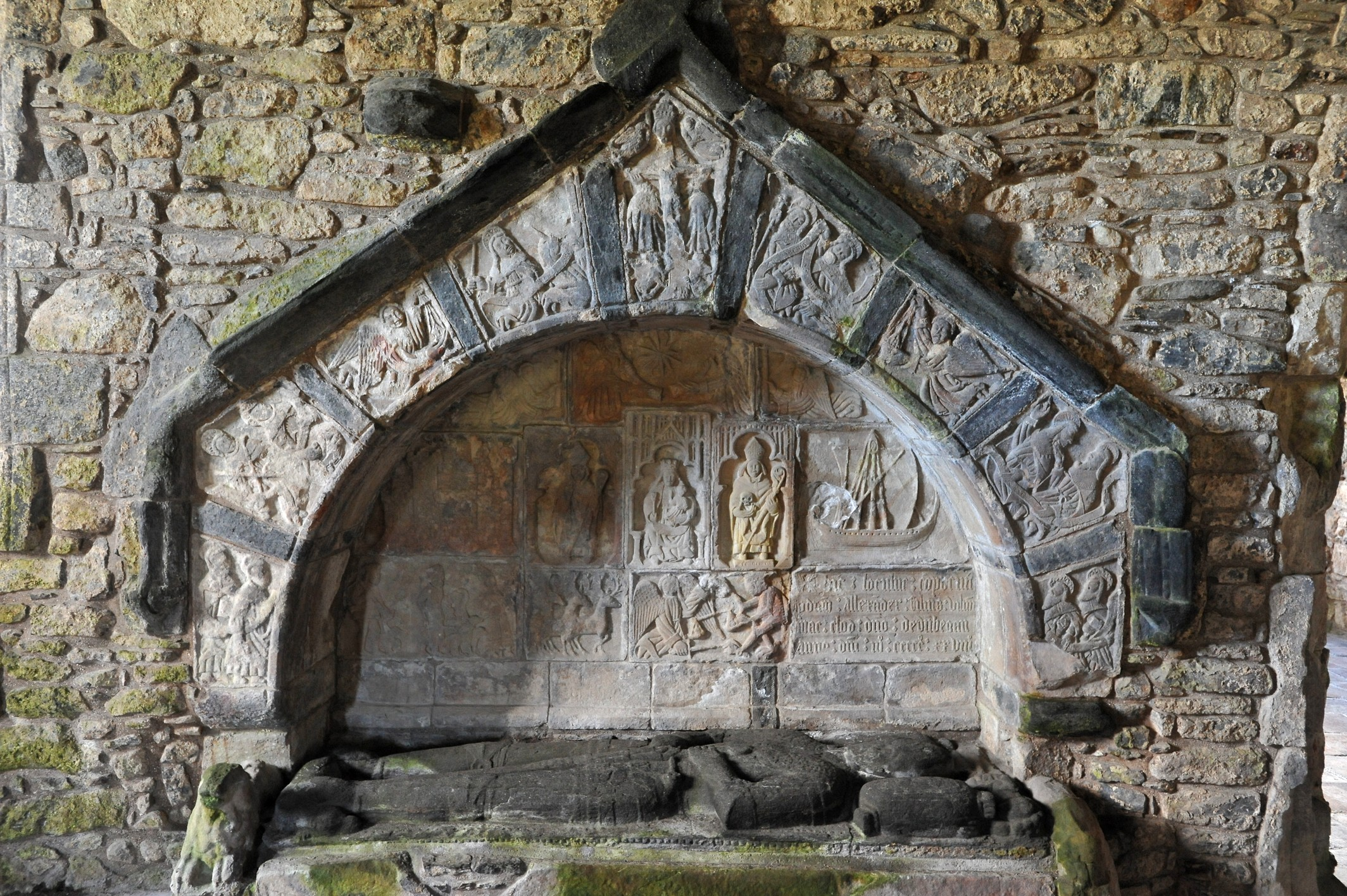
Effigy of Alasdair Crotach

Alasdair Crotach married a daughter of Cameron of Lochiel. The manuscript relates of how Alasdair Crotach was still unmarried even though he was no longer a young man. Cameron of Lochiel had ten daughters and offered him one any of them as a wife. Alasdair Crotach married the youngest of them and she lived to an old age and was buried beside her husband. Alasdair Crotach and his wife had three sons and two daughters; MacLeod considered that their family were likely born between the years 1500 and 1520. The Bannatyne manuscript states that one of the daughters married firstly James MacDonald, second son of Donald of Sleat; she married secondly Allan MacIan of Clanranald; and her third husband was MacDonald of Keppoch. However, while the manuscript states her first marriage was to James, the early 20th-century clan historians A. Macdonald and A. Macdonald stated that a daughter of Alasdair Crotach married not James, but his brother John Og. The two historians state that her second husband, Allan MacDonald, 9th of Clan Ranald repudiated her, and that she afterwards married Ranald MacDonald of Keppoch. The Bannatyne manuscript states that Alasdair Crotach's second daughter married Hector MacLean of Lochbuie.

The Bannatyne manuscript states that Alasdair Crotach had a natural son, Donald Glass. The manuscript relates how this son was on board a birlinn which was seized by a party of MacDonalds, where it was taken to North Uist. Donald Glass was put in irons, and had a heavy weight wrapped around his neck; he was held for six years and never recovered from the ill-treatment he received at the hands of the MacDonalds. Donald Glass's crew fared much worse, however; they were imprisoned in a dungeon, where they starved to death. The manuscript states that it was said that they ate each other till not one remained alive.

== Heraldry ==
The earliest seal attributed to a MacLeod dates to the tenure of Alasdair Crotach's chiefship. This seal dates to the year 1542 and contains a stag's head cabossed with a chequy base. (Note: The Scottish officer of arms William Rae Macdonald described the seal as "A stag head erased, the base a chequy". Macdonald stated that it dated to 29 June 1542. Earlier, Henry Laing noted the seal stating, "Appended to Charter by Alexander M'Leod de Dunvegan of the lands of Ballalraid to John M'Aue M'Leod, natural son of John M'Leod in Megnes, 29th June 1542. — Lovat Charters".)
