= Largie Castle =

Largie Castle may refer to any of several places in Scotland:

- Largie Castle, Rhunahaorine
- Largie Castle, Tayinloan
