= Clan MacDonald of Largie =

Scottish clan

Profile
- Region: Largie, Kintyre

Chief
- Laird John Ranald Maxwell Macdonald
- Seat: Largie, Kintyre
- Historic seat: Largie Castle, Rhunahaorine

Clan MacDonald of Largie, also known as Clan Ranald Bane, is a Scottish clan and a branch of Clan Donald. The founder of the MacDonalds of Largie is Ranald Bane MacDonald, a son of Iain Mhoir Tanistear Mic Dhòmhnaill (John Mor MacDonald, Lord of Dunyvaig and the Glens) and Margery Byset (Margaret Bisset).

== History ==
Ranald Bane was granted lands in Kintyre around Largie by his brother Donald Ballach MacDonald, Chief of Clan MacDonald of Dunnyveg.

In 1647 at the Battle of Rhunahaorine Moss, during the Wars of the Three Kingdoms, the MacDonalds of Largie were routed and Largie Castle at Rhunahaorine was destroyed. Their lands and estate were forfeited and given to Archibald Campbell of Inverawe. The lands and estate were returned during the Restoration in 1660.

== Chiefs ==
- Ranald Bane MacDonald, 1st of Largie
- Donald MacRanald Bane, 2nd of Largie
- Alexander MacDonald, 3rd of Largie
- Donald MacDonald, 4th of Largie
- John MacDonald, 5th of Largie
- Hector MacDonald, 6th of Largie
- Archibald MacDonald, 7th of Largie
- Alexander MacDonald, 8th of Largie
- Angus MacDonald, 9th of Largie
- John MacDonald, 10th of Largie
- John Ranald Maxwell Macdonald 11th of Largie
- John Ranald Maxwell Macdonald (II)12th of Largie
- Fergus John Logie Maxwell MacDonald (next)

== Castles ==
- Largie Castle, Rhunahaorine
- Largie Castle, Tayinloan
