= Godfrey Macdonald =

Godfrey Macdonald may refer to:

- Godfrey Macdonald, 3rd Baron Macdonald (1775–1832)
- Godfrey Macdonald, 8th Baron Macdonald (born 1947)
