= Clan Donald =

Scottish clan

- Clann Dòmhnaill, Na Dòmhnallaich
- Crest: On a crest coronet Or, a hand in armor fessways couped at the elbow proper holding a cross crosslet fitchy Gules.
- Motto: Per mare per terras ('by sea and by land')
- War cry: Fraoch eilean ('the heathery isle')

Profile
- Region: Highland and Islands
- District: Inner Hebrides; Ross
- Plant badge: Common heath

Chief
- Godfrey James Macdonald of that Ilk
- The 8th Baron Macdonald, Chief of the Name and Arms of Macdonald, High Chief of Clan Donald and 34th hereditary Chief of Clan Donald.
- Historic seat: Finlaggan Castle
Septs of Clan Donald
Darroch, MacBeth, MacColl, MacCorran, MacEachan, MacEachern, MacGillanders, MacGorrie, MacMhuirich, MacMurdoch, MacQueen, MacRory, MacRuairi, MacRury, MacSween, MacSweeny, Queen, Rosrieson, Rory
Clan branches
MacDonald of Islay (historic chiefs)
Baron Macdonald (current chiefs)
MacAlister (senior cadet branch of Clan Donald)
Macdonald of Sleat (Clan Donald North)
MacDonald of Dunnyveg (Clan Donald South)
Macdonald of Clanranald (Clan Ranald)
MacDonald of Keppoch (Clan Ranald of Lochaber)
MacDonald of Largie (Clan Ranald Bane)
MacDonell of Glengarry (Clan Ranald of Knoydart & Glengarry)
MacDonnell of Antrim (MacDonnells of the Glens)
MacDonald of Ardnamurchan (Clan MacIain)
Clan MacDonald of Glencoe
MacDonald of Lochalsh
Allied clans
Clan Cameron
Clan MacMillan
Clan Lamont
Clan MacNeill
Clan Matheson
Clan Stewart (17th-18th centuries)
Rival clans
Clan Campbell
Clan Stewart (15th-16th centuries)
Clan MacCallum
Clan Fraser of Lovat
Clan MacLean
Clan MacLeod
Clan Mackenzie
Kindreds
MacMhuirich bardic family
Beaton medical kindred
Clann Ruaidhrí

Clan Donald, also known as Clan MacDonald (sometime abbreviated to McDonald) (Scottish Gaelic: Clann Dòmhnaill; Mac Dòmhnaill [ˈkʰl̪ˠãũn̪ˠ ˈt̪õː.ɪʎ]), is a Highland Scottish clan and one of the largest Scottish clans. Historically the chiefs of the Clan Donald held the title of Lord of the Isles until 1493 and two of those chiefs also held the title of Earl of Ross until 1476.

The Lord Lyon King of Arms, the Scottish official with responsibility for regulating heraldry in that country, issuing new grants of coats of arms, and serving as the judge of the Court of the Lord Lyon, recognises under Scottish law the High Chief of Clan Donald. There are also numerous branches to the Clan Donald, and several of these have chiefs recognised by the Lord Lyon King of Arms; these are: Clan Macdonald of Sleat, Clan Macdonald of Clanranald, Clan MacDonald of Keppoch, Clan MacDonald of Glencoe, Clan MacDonell of Glengarry, and Clan MacAlister.

There are also notable historic branches of Clan Donald without chiefs so-recognised, these are: the Clan MacDonald of Dunnyveg, Clan MacDonald of Lochalsh, and the MacDonalds of Ardnamurchan. The MacDonnells of Antrim are a cadet branch of the MacDonalds of Dunnyveg but do not belong to the Scottish associations and have a chief officially recognised in Ireland.

== History ==
=== Origins ===
The Norse-Gaelic Clan Donald traces its descent from Dòmhnall Mac Raghnuill (died c. 1250), whose father Reginald or Ranald was styled "King of the Isles" and "Lord of Argyll and Kintyre". Ranald's father, Somerled was styled "King of the Hebrides", and was killed campaigning against Malcolm IV of Scotland at the Battle of Renfrew in 1164. Clan Donald shares a descent from Somerled with Clan MacDougall, who traces their lineage from his elder son, Dugall mac Somhairle. Their dynasties are together commonly referred to as the Clann Somhairle. Furthermore, they are descended maternally from both the House of Godred Crovan and the Earls of Orkney, through Somerled's wife Ragnhildis Ólafsdóttir, daughter of Olaf I Godredsson, King of Mann and the Isles and Ingeborg Haakonsdottir, daughter of Haakon Paulsson, Earl of Orkney. It remains uncertain if the Clann Somhairle are also descendants in some manner, through one or another of the above dynasts, of the House of Ivar, but this is commonly argued.

Tradition gave Somerled a Gaelic descent in the male line, as the medieval seanchaidhean (Gaelic historians) traced his lineage through a long line of ancestors back to the High Kings of Ireland, namely Colla Uais and Conn of the Hundred Battles. Thus Clan Donald claimed to be both Clann Cholla and Siol Chuinn (Children of Colla and Seed of Conn). Possibly the oldest piece of poetry attributed to the MacDonalds is a brosnachadh (an incitement to battle) which was said to have been written in 1411, on the day of the Battle of Harlaw. The first lines of the poem begin "A Chlanna Cuinn cuimhnichibh / Cruas an àm na h-iorghaile," (Ye children of Conn remember hardihood in the time of battle). A later poem made to John of Islay (1434–1503), last of the MacDonald Lords of the Isles, proclaims "Ceannas Ghàidheal do Chlainn Cholla, còir fhògradh," (The Headship of the Gael to the family of Colla, it is right to proclaim it), giving MacDonald's genealogy back to Colla Uais.

However, a 2005 DNA study has shown that Somerled was of Norse descent in his male line. By testing the Y-DNA of males bearing the surnames MacDonald, MacDougall, MacAlister, and their variants it was found that a substantial proportion of men tested shared the same Y-DNA and a direct paternal ancestor. This distinct Y-chromosome R1a1 haplotype found in Scotland has been regarded as often showing Norse descent in the Britain and Ireland.

=== Scottish-Norwegian War ===
In 1263 Alexander III of Scotland defeated Haakon IV of Norway at the Battle of Largs. The Clan Donald chief, Aonghas Mor and his clan had technically been vassals of Haakon and so the king of Scots became their new overlord, as confirmed in the Treaty of Perth.

=== Wars of Scottish Independence ===
Aongus Mor's son was Aonghus Óg of Islay who supported Robert the Bruce at the Battle of Bannockburn in 1314. In recognition of Clan Donald's support, King Robert the Bruce proclaimed that Clan Donald would always occupy the honoured position on the right wing of the Scottish army.

=== 15th to 16th centuries ===
==== Succession to the Earldom of Ross ====
The Battle of Harlaw as depicted in The Clan Donald volume 1 (1896), by A and A MacDonald, who assert that Donald of Islay and his army of Scottish Highlanders won a victory over the Duke of Albany and his army of Scottish Lowlanders, which resulted in the "total annihilation" of the Lowland army. However, some historians say the battle was indecisive with no clear victor and the Oxford Companion to Scottish History (2011) states that Donald of Islay was "defeated at great cost at Harlaw".

The title and territory of the Earl of Ross had originally been held by the Chief of Clan Ross but had passed through an heiress to the Leslie or Lesley family in the early 15th century. However, Angus Og's grandson, Donald of Islay, Lord of the Isles married Mariota, Countess of Ross (Margaret Lesley) who was the heiress of the Leslie Earls of Ross and he later claimed the position of Earl of Ross through this marriage.

In 1411, Donald secured Dingwall Castle which was the principal seat of the Earldom of Ross, after he had defeated the powerful Clan Mackay who were supporters of the Stewart confederacy at the Battle of Dingwall. This in turn resulted in the Battle of Harlaw on 24 July 1411, fought between Donald of Islay's forces and those of Robert Stewart, Duke of Albany, led by Alexander Stewart, Earl of Mar. It is believed there were 10,000 men in Donald's army at the Battle of Harlaw,. Although he inflicted a decisive victory, he did not go on to Aberdeen but took his army back to the Western Highlands. In the aftermath, Albany tried to take control of Ross but was unsuccessful. and By 1415 the Earldom of Ross was with Murdoch Stewart, Duke of Albany. Donald prepared for war and proclaimed himself "Lord of Ross". However, the Duke of Albany appointed his own son John Stewart, 2nd Earl of Buchan as the new Earl of Ross.

In 1429 the Battle of Lochaber took place where forces led by Donald's son, Alexander of Islay, 3rd Lord of the Isles and Earl of Ross, fought against the royalist army of James I of Scotland. Two years later the Battle of Inverlochy (1431) took place; While chief Alexander of Islay, Lord of the Isles was imprisoned by King James I, the Clan MacDonald were led by his nephew, Donald Balloch MacDonald, who defeated Alexander Stewart, Earl of Mar's royal army. The armies of the MacDonald Lords of the Isles were the only magnate forces in Scotland capable of inflicting defeats on the Crown at this time. The Battle of Inverlochy in 1431 is one example of this and the Battle of Lagabraad in Ross in 1480 is another. James I finally conceded to Alexander's rule in the Isles and Ross. Thus, the MacDonald chiefs would succeed as the Earls of Ross: firstly Alexander of Islay, Earl of Ross, son of Donald of Islay and Mariota, Countess of Ross, succeeded to the earldom as confirmed by a charter dated September 1437, following the assassination of James I of Scotland in February of the same year. Secondly, Alexander's son John of Islay, Earl of Ross who surrendered the earldom in 1475 to the King.

According to 17th-century historian Sir Robert Gordon, 1st Baronet who himself was a younger son of Alexander Gordon, 12th Earl of Sutherland, in 1455 the Battle of Skibo and Strathfleet took place where John of Islay invaded Sutherland but was defeated by the Clan Sutherland who were led by Robert Sutherland, brother of John Sutherland, 7th Earl of Sutherland.

==== Forfeiture of the Earldom of Ross and Lordship of the Isles ====
In 1475, James III of Scotland forfeited the MacDonald Earldom of Ross and although the MacDonald Lordship of the Isles was not forfeited until 1493, in many ways 1475 marked the end of the lordship as a potent force. Following this is what the Books of Clanranald describe as a "great struggle for power among the Gael". Various leaders, such as Aonghas Óg who was the fourth illegitimate son of the Lord of the Isles, along with his son, Domhnall Dubh, and also Alexander MacDonald of Lochalsh and John Mor MacDonald of Dunyvaig were seeking to restore the MacDonald hegemony in the west. The Battle of Bloody Bay took place in 1480 where John MacDonald of Islay, Lord of the Isles and chief of Clan Donald was defeated by his son Aonghas Óg. Aonghas Óg's son Domhnall Dubh rebelled against James IV of Scotland and made an alliance with Henry VIII of England in an attempt to regain the Lordship of the Isles and although various attempts were made to restore the lordship, by 1545 all had failed. The ultimate victors were the Crown's hard men in the north and west: Alexander Gordon, 3rd Earl of Huntly (chief of Clan Gordon), Archibald Campbell, 2nd Earl of Argyll (chief of Clan Campbell) and John MacIain of Ardnamurchan. The various branches of the Clan Donald began accepting charters from the Crown in recognition of their separate holdings. This was part of a royal policy that successfully kept the Clan Donald divided, and in doing so they were less of a threat to the central authority.

The MacDonnells of Antrim in Ireland were a sept of Clan Donald. MacDonnell migration to the Glens and Rathlin Island increased in the early 16th century after the clan had rejected overtures from an increasingly powerful James IV, King of Scotland.

=== 17th century; Civil War and 1689–1692 Jacobite rising ===
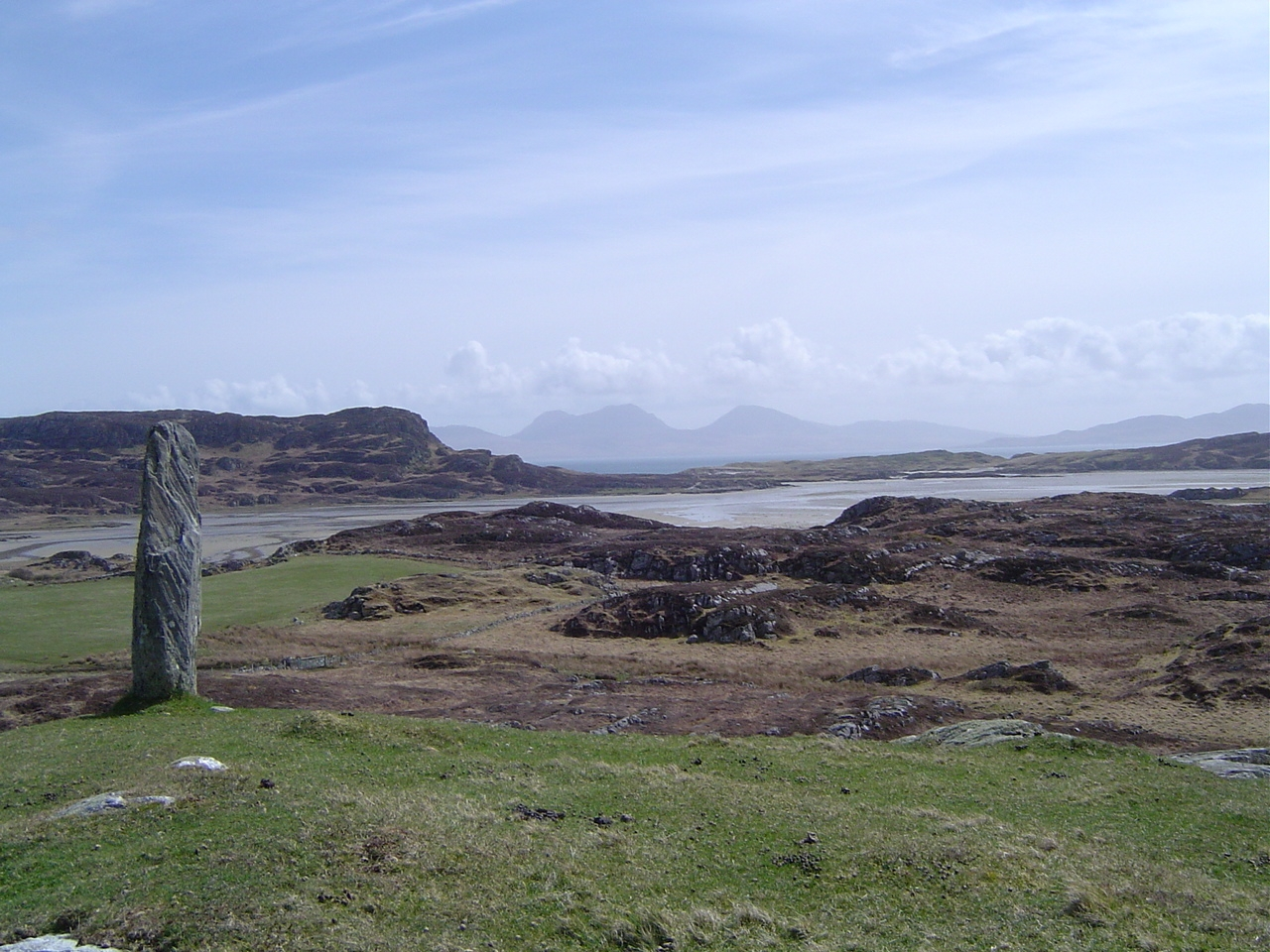
Colonsay, Inner Hebrides; loss of the Lordship of the Isles fractured MacDonald unity

Loss of the Lordship of the Isles fractured Highland society and the MacDonalds in particular, who were left holding lands on either side of the Irish Sea, rather than a unified block of territory. Their attempts to re-establish control destabilised Western Scotland for generations; the charge of "slaughter under trust", later applied after the Massacre of Glencoe in 1692, was introduced in 1587 to reduce the endemic feuding that resulted. Opponents now had to apply to the Crown to settle disputes, and it applied to murder committed in "cold blood", i.e. once articles of surrender had been agreed or hospitality accepted. The first recorded use was the 1588 prosecution of Lachlan Maclean, whose objections to his new stepfather, John MacDonald, resulted in the murder of 18 members of the MacDonald wedding party.

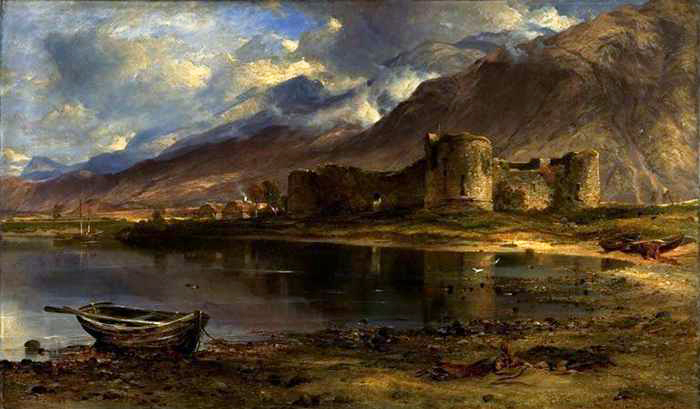
Inverlochy Castle: a Campbell-dominated army camped here before their destruction on 2 February 1645 by a largely MacDonald force

The 1638–1651 Wars of the Three Kingdoms caused huge dislocation and damage throughout the British Isles; in 1641, the Scottish Covenanter government sent an expeditionary force that joined the vicious and bloody Irish Rebellion. All sides committed atrocities, leading to a series of tit-for-tat responses, exacerbated by long-standing animosities; in 1642 on Rathlin Island, soldiers from a predominantly Clan Campbell-recruited unit led by Sir Duncan Campbell threw scores of MacDonnell women over the cliffs to their deaths on rocks below.

Scotland initially stayed neutral in the First English Civil War but became involved in 1643; the shifting alliances only make sense if one understands that in Scotland, both Royalists and Covenanters agreed that the institution of monarchy was divinely ordered, but disagreed on the nature and extent of royal authority in relation to that of the church. This makes it hard to categorise clans as wholly "Royalist", "Catholic", or later "Jacobite".

In 1644, Alasdair Mac Colla landed in Scotland with 1500 Irish troops to link up with the Scottish Royalists; Alasdair was from Clan Donald of Dunnyveg, which historically held lands in the western Scottish islands and North-East Ireland. They joined up with Montrose and played a leading role in the 1644–1645 campaign; this was highly successful, with victory at the Battle of Inverlochy leaving Montrose in effective control of Scotland.

Inverlochy and the entire Montrose campaign are often presented as a clan battle between Campbells and MacDonalds; while there is certainly some truth in this, many others were involved. The persistence of this idea in Gaelic folklore was partly driven by deliberate policy, since Montrose used it as a means of recruiting. Ultimately the campaign ended in failure and division, since Mac Colla's objective was to regain territories in the Western Highlands, while Montrose's was to move south and aid Charles. The two split; Mac Colla's ravaging of Campbell lands was still remembered with deep bitterness 300 years later.

In 1692 in the Massacre of Glencoe, 38 unarmed MacDonalds from the Clan MacDonald of Glencoe were murdered when an initiative to suppress Jacobitism was entangled in the long-running feud, and MacIain, who was the chief of the MacDonalds of Glencoe, was late in signing an oath of allegiance to William III of England. The event served as part of the inspiration for "The Red Wedding" as featured in books and TV series Game of Thrones.

=== 18th century and Jacobite risings ===
==== Jacobite rising of 1715 ====
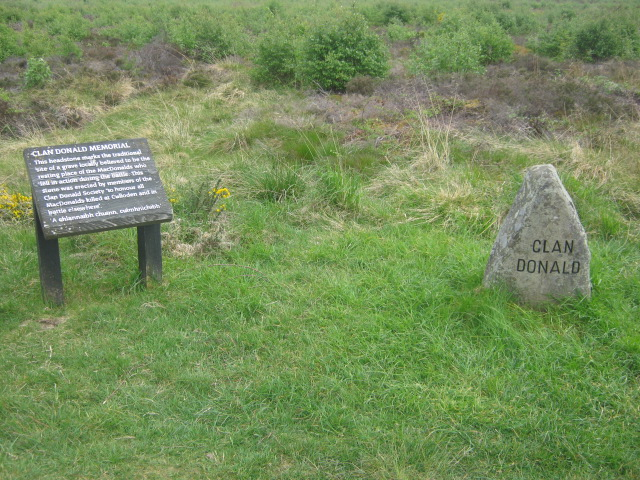
Clan Donald grave marker at the site of the Battle of Culloden

During the Jacobite rising of 1715 the MacDonalds supported the Jacobite cause of the House of Stuart. Men of Clan MacDonald of Keppoch, and the Clan Macdonald of Clanranald fought at the Battle of Sheriffmuir on 13 November 1715 where chief Allan MacDonald of Clanranald was killed. The Clan MacDonald of Glencoe also fought at Sherriffmuir.

==== Jacobite rising of 1745 ====
During the Jacobite rising of 1745 the Clan MacDonell of Glengarry along with the Clan MacDonald of Keppoch and the MacDonalds of Glencoe fought as Jacobites at the Battle of Prestonpans on 21 September 1745.

The Clan MacDonald of Clanranald, along with the Clan MacDonald of Glengarry, and Clan MacDonald of Keppoch, fought as Jacobites at the Battle of Falkirk Muir on 17 January 1746

The Clan MacDonald of Glencoe, Clan MacDonald of Clanranald, and Clan MacDonell of Glengarry, fought as Jacobites at the Battle of Culloden in April 1746, as did the Clan MacDonald of Keppoch whose chief, Alexander MacDonald of Keppoch, was killed.

The Clan MacDonald of Sleat branch had fought for the Jacobites in the 1715 rebellion, however they actually formed two battalions (Independent Highland Companies) in support of the British Government during the 1745 rebellion and as a result the Sleat possessions remained intact. However, according to A and A MacDonald these two companies were more of a hindrance than help to the Government as they were made up of officers and men who were in entire sympathy with the Jacobite Prince Charles Edward Stuart.

== Chief ==
In 1947, the Lord Lyon King of Arms granted the undifferenced arms of Macdonald to Alexander Godfrey Macdonald, 7th Lord Macdonald, making him the first High Chief of Clan Donald. After his death in 1970, he was succeeded by his son Godfrey James Macdonald of Macdonald, 8th Lord Macdonald, who is the current high chief of Clan Donald. In 1972, the Macdonald estates were sold off to pay death duties. Lord Macdonald lives at Kinloch Lodge on Skye with his wife, the food writer Claire Macdonald (m. 1969).

=== Historic chiefs ===
The following is a list of some of the early chiefs of Clan Donald.

Name	Died	Notes
Dòmhnall Dubh	1545	Rebelled against the king of Scots but made an alliance with the king of England.
Aonghas Òg	1490	"Bastard" son of John of Islay. Last MacDonald Lord of the Isles.
John of Islay, Earl of Ross	1503	Fought at the Battle of Bloody Bay against his son.
Alexander of Islay, Earl of Ross	1449	His second son was Celestine of Lochalsh, 1st of the Macdonald of Lochalsh branch, and his third son was Hugh of Sleat, 1st of the Macdonalds of Sleat branch.
Dòmhnall of Islay, Lord of the Isles	1422/3	Fought and was victorious at the Battle of Harlaw.
John of Islay, Lord of the Isles	1380	John married: 1. Amy of Garmoran, heiress of Clann Ruaidhrí, and their eldest son was Ranald MacDonald (founder of Clanranald).; 2. Margaret Stewart, daughter of Robert II of Scotland. The senior descendants of John's second marriage would succeed as the Lords of the Isles. His second son from his second marriage was John Mòr, 1st of the MacDonells of Antrim branch and third son was Alastair Carroch of Keppoch, 1st of the Macdonald of Keppoch branch.
Aonghus Óg of Islay	1314×1318/c.1330	Fought at the Battle of Bannockburn. In addition to his other sons, he had an illegitimate son, Ian Fraoch, who became the 1st of the Macdonalds of Glencoe.
Domhnall of Islay	×1318?	His parentage is uncertain. He appears to have been a contender for the chiefship and may have acted as chief. He may have been the MacDonald chief killed at the Battle of Faughart in 1318.
Alexander Og MacDonald, Lord of Islay	1299?	There are two views as to when this eldest son of Angus Mor died. The first is that he was killed by the MacDougalls in 1299 in Ireland (though this may have been his uncle, also named Alexander); the other is that he fought against Robert the Bruce in Galloway in 1308, was captured by Edward Bruce, escaped to Castle Sween in North Knapdale, was recaptured by Robert the Bruce and taken prisoner to Dundonald Castle in Kintyre where he died. He was succeeded in 1308 by his brother Angus Og MacDonald, a staunch ally of Robert the Bruce.
Aonghas Mór (Angus Mor MacDonald)	c. 1293	He was succeeded by his eldest son, Alexander Og. He was also the father of Aonghus Óg of Islay and John Sprangach of Ardnamurchan, 1st of the Macdonalds of Ardnamurchan branch.
Dòmhnall Mac Raghnuill (Donald)		From whom the Clan Donald takes its name.

== Castles ==
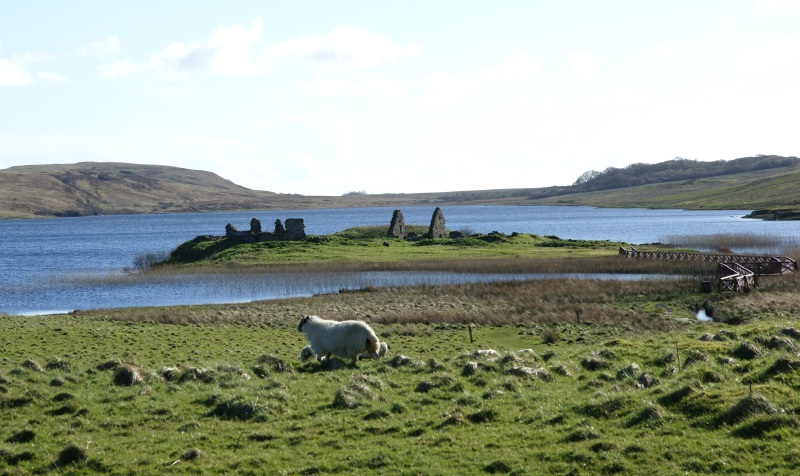
Ruins of Finlaggan Castle, historic seat of the Lords of the Isles who were chiefs of Clan Donald

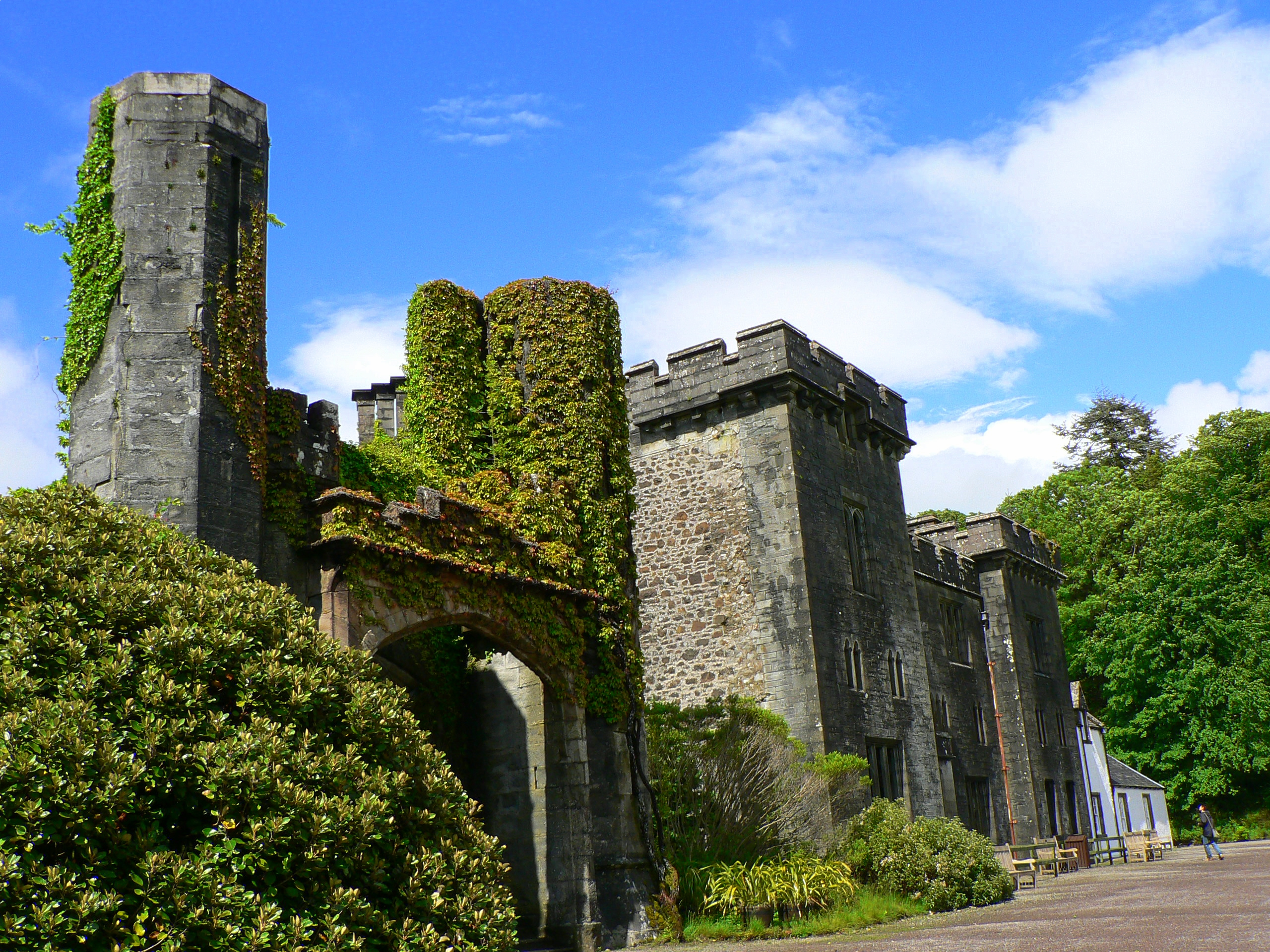
Armadale Castle on the Isle of Skye that houses the Clan Donald Centre and the Museum of the Isles

Over the centuries MacDonald castles have included:

=== Clan Donald castles ===
- Finlaggan Castle was located on an island, on Loch Finlaggan, on the Isle of Islay. It was the seat of the chief of Clan Donald, Lord of the Isles.
- Armadale Castle on the Isle of Skye was begun in 1815 and today houses the Clan Donald Centre and the Museum of the Isles which are open to the public.
- Knock Castle (Isle of Skye) is a ruined Macdonald castle located on the Isle of Skye.
- Duntulm Castle is a ruined MacDonald castle located on the Isle of Skye.
- Aros Castle is a ruined MacDonald castle located on the Isle of Mull.
- Claig Castle is a ruined MacDonald castle located on the Isle of Jura.
- Kildonan Castle is a ruined MacDonald castle located on the Isle of Arran.
- Ardtornish Castle is a ruined MacDonald castle located on the peninsula Morvern.
- Dunaverty Castle, is a ruined MacDonald castle, off the coast of Kintyre, known as Blood Rock because of the incident known as the Dunaverty Massacre.

=== Clan Donald branch castles ===
- Castle Tioram, Loch Moidart, Lochaber was the seat of the Clan Macdonald of Clanranald.
- Borve Castle, Benbecula was another castle of the MacDonalds of Clanranald.
- Ormiclate Castle was another castle of the Macdonalds of Clanranald.
- Invergarry Castle, built on the Rock of the Raven was the seat of the Clan MacDonnell of Glengarry.
- Strome Castle on the shore of Loch Carron was an earlier castle of the MacDonnells of Glengarry.
- Dunluce Castle in Ireland was the seat of the Clan MacDonnell of Antrim, Earls of Antrim.
- Glenarm Castle in Ireland was another castle of the MacDonnells of Antrim.
- Dunyvaig Castle on the Isle of Islay was the seat of the Clan MacDonald of Dunnyveg.
- Gorm Castle, on an island in Loch Gorm, which itself is in the Isle of Islay, was another seat of the Clan MacDonald of Dunnyveg.
- Island Muller Castle in Kintyre was another seat of the Clan MacDonald of Dunnyveg.
- Dunscaith Castle (Dun Sgathaich) on the Isle of Skye was the seat of the Clan MacDonald of Sleat.
- Keppoch Castle which was near to Spean Bridge in Lochaber was the seat of the Clan MacDonald of Keppoch until it passed to the Mackintoshes in 1690.
- Mingary Castle in Kilchoan, Lochaber was the seat of the Clan MacDonald of Ardnamurchan.
- Largie Castle, Rhunahaorine was the seat of the Clan MacDonald of Largie.

== Tartans ==
Tartan image	Notes
	MacDonald of the Isles (MakDonnald of ye Ylis) tartan, as published in the Vestiarium Scoticum in 1842.

== See also ==
- Gaelic nobility of Ireland
- Keppoch murders
- Macdonald (surname article)
- Clandonald, Alberta, Canada
