= Claire Macdonald =

Scottish cookery writer and hotelier

Claire, Lady Macdonald OBE is a Scottish cookery writer and former hotelier.

== Biography ==
Claire Macdonald is one of three daughters of Captain Thomas Noel Catlow CBE DL RN and his wife Jean (née Nuttall), and lived as a child in Thurland Castle in Lancashire. In 1969 she married Godfrey Macdonald, who the following year, on the death of his father, became the 8th Baron Macdonald and High Chief of Clan Donald.

Lord and Lady Macdonald have four children:

- Hon. Alexandra Louise Macdonald, b. 19 Aug 1973, married the German-Austrian nobleman and landowner Philipp zu Guttenberg (b. 1973), brother of German politician Karl-Theodor zu Guttenberg
- Hon. Isabella Claire Macdonald, b. 2 Oct 1975
- Hon. Meriel Iona Macdonald, b. 1978
- Hon. (Godfrey Evan) Hugo Thomas Macdonald, b. 24 Feb 1982

== Hotelier ==
The Macdonald estates on the Isle of Skye had historically been very extensive but the death duties payable on the deaths of Lord Macdonald's grandfather and father necessitated their sale. Lord and Lady Macdonald for the next four decades ran a successful hotel at Kinloch Lodge, a former Macdonald hunting lodge near Isleornsay.

== Honours and awards ==
Lady Macdonald is a Patron of Scottish Food Fortnight and The Association of Scottish Farmers’ Markets. She has received a Lifetime Achievement Award from the Royal Highland and Agricultural Society of Scotland. In 2008 she received an honorary doctorate from Abertay University and in 2011, she was given the National Farmers' Union of Scotland’s Ambassador Award. She was appointed an Officer of the Order of the British Empire in the New Year Honours List on 31 December 2013.

== Writer ==
=== Cookery books ===
- Sweet Things (Century, 1984)
- Seasonal Cooking (Corgi, 1986)
- The Harrods Book of Entertaining (Ebury Press, 1986)
- Delicious Fish (Grafton, 1986)
- More Seasonal Cooking (Bantam Press, 1987)
- Lady Macdonald’s Chocolate Book (Ebury, 1988)
- Celebrations (Bantam, 1989)
- Lady Macdonald’s Scotland: the Best of Scottish Food and Drink (Bullfinch Press, 1990)
- Quick and Easy Desserts and Puddings (BBC Books, 1993)
- Suppers (Doubleday, 1994)
- Lunches (Doubleday, 1996)
- The Claire Macdonald Cookbook (Bantam, 1997)
- Claire Macdonald’s Scottish cookery (Pitkin, 1998)
- Claire Macdonald’s Simply Seasonal: delicious recipes for year-round informal entertaining (Bantam, 2001)
- Claire Macdonald’s Entertaining Solo: delicious recipes for single cooks who like to entertain (Bantam, 2002)
- Scottish Highland Hospitality: New Recipes from the Scottish Highlands and Islands (Black & White, 2003)
- Fish: inspiring fish recipes for creative cooks (Bantam, 2006)
- The Scottish Salmon Bible (Birlinn, 2013)
- The Scottish Food Bible (Birlinn, 2014)
- The Claire Macdonald Game Cookbook (Birlinn, 2015)

=== Memoirs ===
- Lifting the lid: a life at Kinloch Lodge, Skye (Birlinn, 2012).
