= Lord Macdonald =

Lord Macdonald may refer to:

- The High Chief of the Scottish Clan Donald
- Baron Macdonald in the Peerage of Ireland
- Ken Macdonald, Baron Macdonald of River Glaven, QC
