= St Clement's Church, Rodel =

Historic church in Rodel, Harris, Scotland

- Tùr Chliamhainn (Scottish Gaelic)
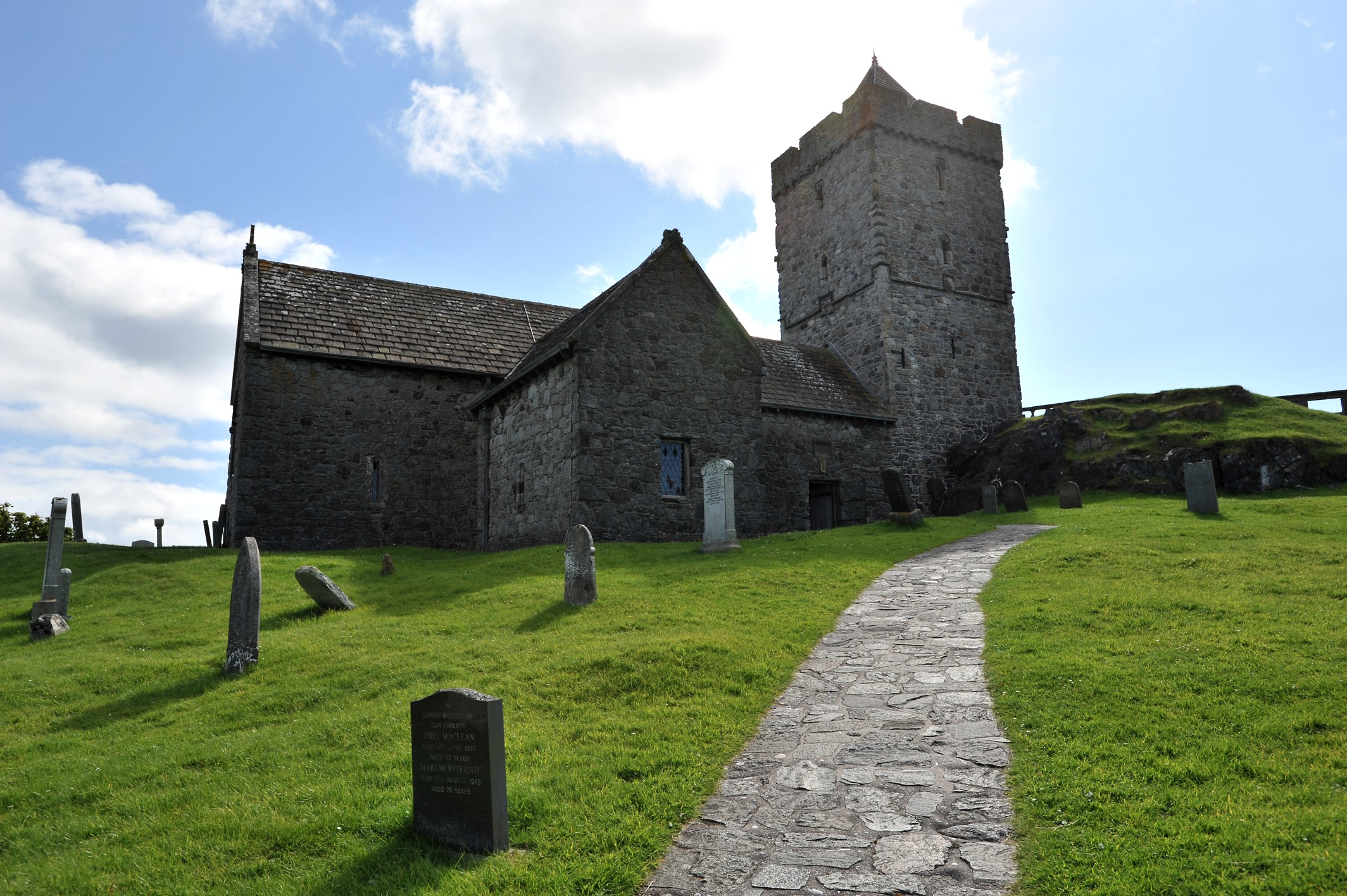
- Saint Clement's church photographed from the pathway leading up to the main entrance

- Location on Harris
- 57.73967°N 6.960783°W

History
- Built: Early 16th Century
- Built for: Alasdair Crotach MacLeod

Listed Building – Category A
- Designated: 5 October 1971
- Reference no.: LB12912

St Clement's Church (Scottish Gaelic: Tùr Chliamhainn, meaning Clement's Tower) is a late fifteenth-century or early sixteenth-century church in Rodel, Harris, Scotland, built for the Chiefs of the MacLeods of Harris. It is dedicated to Pope Clement I. It is sometimes known as Eaglais Roghadail or Rodal Church.

== Architecture ==
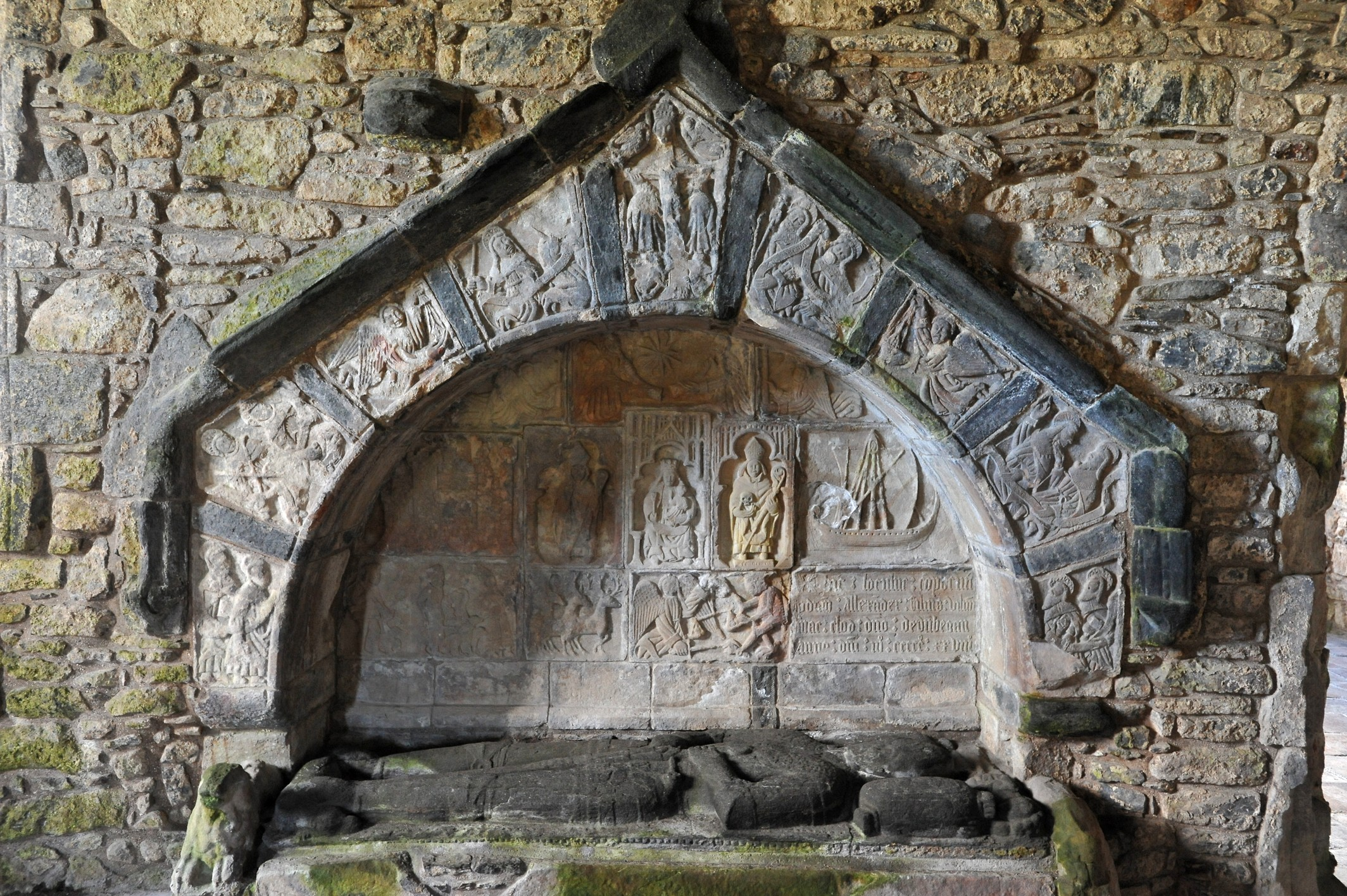
Alasdair Crotach's wall tomb

The church was built using local Lewisian gneiss rock. Its ground plan is cruciform and there is a tower at the west end, accessible through a door at the west end of the nave and a set of stone staircases and wooden ladders. The choir and the sanctuary with the high altar, which used to be separated by the nave by a wooden screen, are located at the opposite east end of the church. In the transepts leading off from the nave on both sides, there are additional chapels, the entrance door points nord and leads to nave. The architectural style is essentially that of 1520 to 1550.

In 1528, Alasdair Crotach MacLeod, 8th Chief, prepared for himself a magnificent wall tomb on the south side of the choir - possibly the finest medieval wall tomb in Scotland, being crowned by an arch and ornated by carvings of biblical design. The 9th Chief, Alasadair or Alexander's son William, had his grave prepared in the south wall of the nave in 1539. In the south transept, there is a third grave probably belonging to John MacLeod of Minginish, the 10th Chief. There are five more grave slabs leaning against the wall of the north transept. The graveyard surrounding the church contains a number of MacLeod tombs.

== History ==
According to Dean Donald Munro in his 1549 work about the Western Isles, the church was built for the Chiefs of the MacLeods of Harris, who lived in Dunvegan Castle in Skye, probably from about 1520, and is not considered the first church on the site although there is no clear evidence of an older Celtic church. Munro described the church as a monastery, but as there is no evidence hinting to a monastic community, this expression is believed to refer to a minister, and with it to an important parish church. It was a Catholic church before falling into disuse shortly after its completion around 1560 as a consequence of the reformation, but the churchyard continued to be used as a MacLeod burial site. The church's decayed roof was renewed in 1784 by Captain Alexander MacLeod of Berneray, but burned down shortly after and had to be rebuilt once again in 1787. In the 19th century it was used as a cow byre before being restored by Catherine Herbert Countess of Dunmore in 1873, and in 1913, the tower was rebuilt after being damaged by a lightning strike six years earlier. Today, the church is under the care of Historic Scotland. Notable 17th-century poet Mary Macleod (Mairi Nighean Alasdair Ruaidh) is said to be buried here.
