= Innis Chonnell =

Small rocky island in Loch Awe, Scotland

Coordinates: 56°15′24″N 5°16′4″W

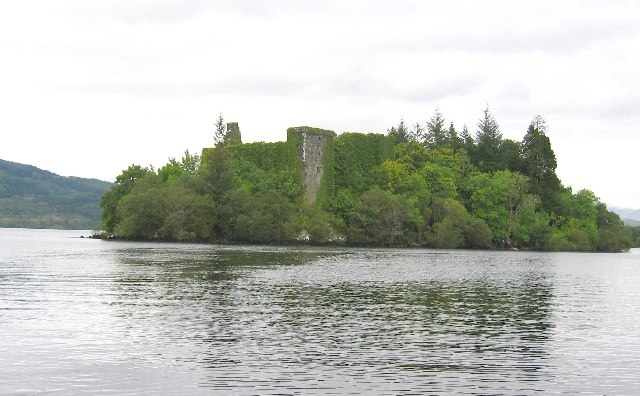
The ruins of 13th century Innes Chonnel Castle on Innis Chonnell.

Innischonnell (Scottish Gaelic: Innis Chonaill) is a small rocky island in Loch Awe, Scotland. It is part of Kilchrenan and Dalavich parish, in Argyll. The island is 14 mi (23 km) east of Kilmartin, Argyll.
