= Clan Darroch =

Scottish clan

- Clann Domhnuill Riabhaich
- Motto: Be Watchful

Profile
- Region: Highlands and Lowlands
- District: Inner Hebrides (Highland); Stirling (Lowland)

Chief
- Claire Darroch of Gourock, Lady Gourock
- 9th Baroness of Gourock, Chief of Clan Darroch (McIllreich)
Allied clans
Clan Donald

Clan Darroch is a Scottish clan. The current Chief of the Name and Arms of Darroch as recognized by the Lord Lyon King of Arms is descended from the Darrochs of Jura.

== History ==
=== Origins of the name ===
The name Darroch is said to derive from Macdara which is Scottish Gaelic for son of oak. The Darrochs settled around Stirling and the name appears to have been derived from the lands of Darroch, near Falkirk, where there may have once been an oak grove. In accordance with this legend the chief's arms bear three oak trees.

There is a tradition in the West Highlands that the surname borne there is derived from the Gaelic Dath riabhach, which is said to be a short form of Mac 'Ille riabhach; although etymologist George Fraser Black thought such a derivation doubtful. The present line of chiefs, recognised as such by the Lord Lyon King of Arms since the late 18th century, claimed to descend from a "McIlliriech" from Jura.

=== Darrochs of Stirling ===
In 1406 John Darroch was ballie of Stirling. Later, in 1445, John Darach de Cruce is mentioned and is maybe the same person who was Commissioner to Parliament for the burgh of Stirling by the name of John Darraugh. In 1462 the nurse of Lady Margaret Stewart, daughter of James II of Scotland was Mariote Darrauch. Marion Darroch of Stirling protested in 1471 that she had not given consent to the alienation of an annual rent owed to her. In 1477 Jacobus Darroch appears as a witness to a charter to the lands of the Stirlings of Keir.

=== Darrochs of the Inner Hebrides ===
The Darrochs were most numerous on the islands of Islay and Jura. Here they were part of the larger Clan Donald. These Darrochs were known as the Clann Domhnuill Riabhaich which is a corruption of dath riabhach, which is Gaelic for brindled colour. This was to distinguish them from the fair headed inhabitants of Jura, who were known as dath buidhe – from which the name 'Bowie' is derived.

The Mic ille Riabhaich appear in 1623 on a bond acknowledging as their overlord, Sir Donald MacDonald, 1st Baronet of Sleat. In the bond MacDonald promises in return due protection.

The Gaelic patronymic of the Darroch chief became McIllreich.

==== 18th century ====
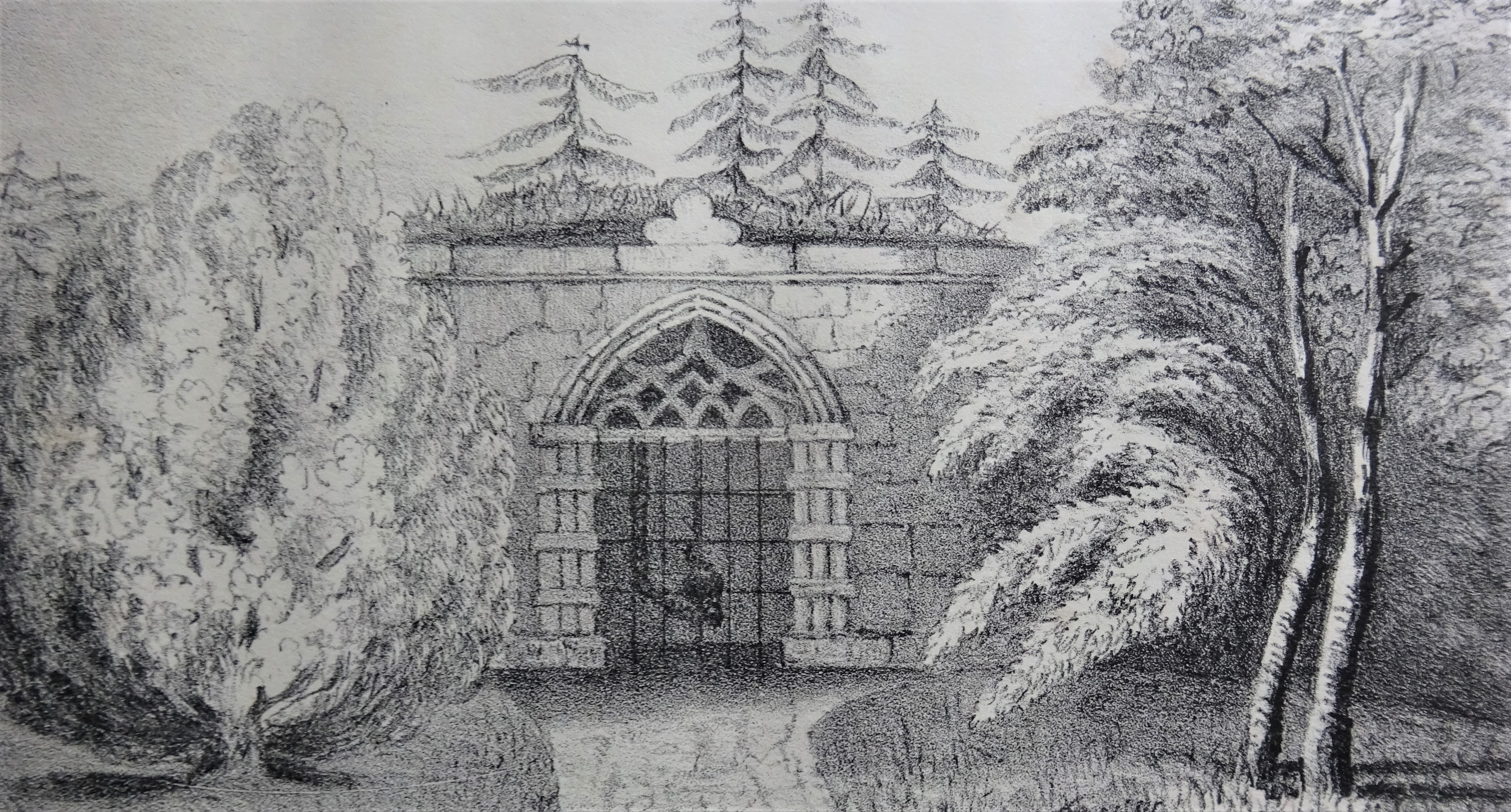
The Darroch Mausoleum in 1841 at Gourock Park

The Barons of Gourock were descended from the McIllreich of Jura. Duncan Darroch who had been born on Jura, probably in the early 18th century, settled in Jamaica. There he amassed a considerable estate and prospered. However he was determined to return to his native soil and in 1784 acquired the lands and barony of Gourock from the Stewarts of Castlemilk. He was designated Chief of that ancient name the patronymic of which is McIllreich by the Lord Lyon King of Arms.

The Arms of DARROCH OF GOUROCK – Argent a three masted ship under full sail in a sea all proper between three oak trees eradicated proper fructed Or. Lyon Office Public Register, vol 46, page 25, 15 October 1962, Way of Plean and Squire, p116

== See also ==
- Scottish clan
