= Godfrey Macdonald, 8th Baron Macdonald =

Scottish clan chief of Macdonald

The Right Honourable The Lord Macdonald
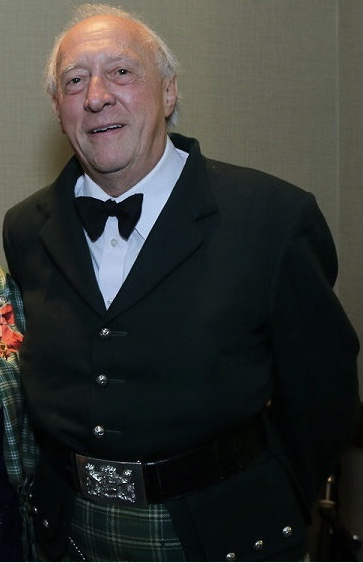
- The 8th Baron Macdonald.
- Born: Godfrey James Macdonald; 28 November 1947 (age 78)
- Education: Eton College
- Occupation: Landowner
- Title: 8th Baron Macdonald
- Predecessor: Alexander Macdonald, 7th Baron Macdonald
- Spouse(s): Claire Macdonald (née Catlow; m. 1969)
- Children: Hon. Alexandra Louise Macdonald; Hon. Isabella Claire Macdonald; Hon. Meriel Iona Macdonald; Hon. (Godfrey Evan) Hugo Thomas Macdonald
- Parents: Alexander Macdonald, 7th Baron Macdonald (father); Anne Whitaker (mother)

Godfrey James Macdonald, 8th Baron Macdonald (born 28 November 1947), is a Scottish nobleman, landowner and head of Clan Donald.

== Early life ==
He is the second child and oldest son of Alexander Macdonald, 7th Baron Macdonald, and his wife Anne Whitaker. He was educated at Eton College.

== Career ==
Lord Macdonald succeeded to the title Baron Macdonald in 1970 on the death of his father, becoming Chief of the Clan Donald. Being a title in the Peerage of Ireland he wasn't entitled to a seat in the House of Lords even before the House of Lords Act 1999.

He was an elected member of Invernessshire County Council 1970–1975 and of Skye and Lochalsh District Council 1975–1983.

== Personal life ==
On 14 June 1969, Macdonald married Claire Catlow OBE. Together, the couple have three daughters and a son:

- Hon. Alexandra Louise Macdonald (b. 1973), who married the German-Austrian nobleman and landowner Baron Philipp zu Guttenberg, brother of German politician Baron Karl-Theodor zu Guttenberg.
- Hon. Isabella Claire Macdonald, (b. 2 Oct 1975)
- Hon. Meriel Iona Macdonald (b. 1978)
- Hon. Godfrey Evan Hugo Thomas Macdonald (b. 1982).

Lady Macdonald is a noted cook and food writer.

Peerage of Ireland
| Preceded by Alexander Macdonald | Baron Macdonald; 1970-present | Incumbent |
