= Battle of Bloody Bay =

Naval battle fought near Tobermory, Scotland

Coordinates: 56°39′N 6°7′W

- Part of Clan MacDonald internal conflicts
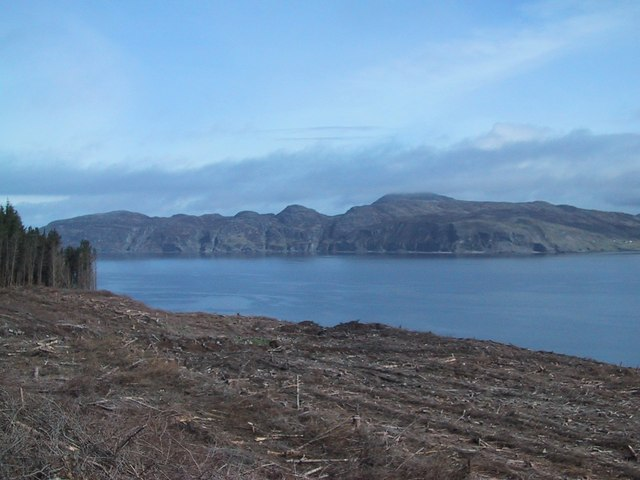
- Bloody Bay
Date	c. 1480 or 1483
Location	North end of the Sound of Mull, Scotland grid reference NM4858
Result	Victory for Angus Òg

Belligerents
Clan MacDonald Clan Maclean; Clan MacNeil; Clan MacLeod	Clan Macdonald of Clanranald; Clan Macdonald of Sleat; Clan MacDonald of Keppoch Clan MacLeod of Lewis

Commanders and leaders
John of Islay (Lord of the Isles and chief of Clan Donald)	Angus Òg (son of John of Islay)

Strength
Unknown	Unknown

Casualties and losses
Unknown	Unknown

The Battle of Bloody Bay, or Blàr Bàgh na Fala in Scottish Gaelic, was a naval battle fought near Tobermory, Scotland. It was fought on the coast of Mull 2 miles (3 kilometres) north of Tobermory, between John MacDonald of Islay, the Lord of the Isles and chief of Clan Donald; and his son, Angus Og Macdonald. The precise date of the battle varies in sources, from 1480 to 1483. After the battle, in which Angus Og Macdonald emerged victorious, the latter seized power from his father, and held it for the rest of the decade. However, Angus's victory would prove pyrrhic. Many clansmen had died in the battle and nearly half the clan's fleet had been sunk, as a result of which the power of the Lords of the Isles was henceforth greatly diminished. Angus, last of the independent Lords of the Isles, would himself be murdered in 1490.

== Background ==
In 1476, James III of Scotland was informed of a secret treaty made by John of Islay with Edward IV of England. James stripped John of his earldom, as well as the sheriffdoms of Nairn and Inverness, and the lordships of Kintyre and Knapdale, but confirmed him with the remainder of his lands and the title Lord of the Isles. The designation of Lord of the Isles, however, was from this point forward to be granted by the crown, rather than self-assumed. And John had lost much more than land and titles; he had lost prestige and standing among his own kin. The Lordship had always depended on territorial expansion to give life to its warrior values; but now that it was contracting, all of the latent tensions came forth, finding expression in the person of Angus Óg. Angus, according to Hugh Macdonald, ejected John both from the leadership of the clan and from his own home, forcing him to seek shelter under an old boat.

John gathered his remaining supporters in an attempt to quash his son's rebellion. John's fleet of galleys met those of Angus sometime in the early 1480s off the coast of Mull to the north-west of the present town of Tobermory, an area ever afterwards to be known as Bloody Bay.

== Battle ==
John MacDonald of Islay was supported by men from the Clan Maclean, Clan MacLeod, and Clan MacNeil. He was opposed by his son, Angus Og Macdonald, who was supported by Allan Macruari, chief of the Clan Macdonald of Clanranald, Donald Gallach, chief of the Clan Macdonald of Sleat, and Domhnall Mac Aonghais (Donald Mac Angus), chief of the Clan MacDonald of Keppoch as well as the MacLeods of Lewis. In bitter fighting, Aonghas defeated the galleys of his father's west highland allies.

The Bannatyne Manuscript states that William Dubh, chief of the MacLeods, was killed early on, and at the fall of their chief, the MacLeods began to give way. However, a priest named Callum Clerich made the keeper of the Fairy Flag unfurl his banner. The manuscript states that when the MacLeod's kinsmen, the MacLeods of Lewis, switched sides upon seeing the sacred flag unfurled and joined the forces supporting John. However, the fate of the battle was already decided and the forces of Angus won the day. A large number of the clan was killed during the conflict, including the bearer of the flag, Murcha Beach, as well as the twelve men who were tasked with the flag's protection.

Hector Odhar Maclean, the chief of Clan Maclean and John of Islays's naval commander, was taken prisoner. William Dubh MacLeod, chief of Clan MacLeod, was killed along with many of his clan.

== Aftermath ==
After the battle, Angus Og Macdonald took over power from his father, and held it for a decade until he was murdered. However, many clansmen died, and nearly half the clan's fleet had been sunk. Angus himself would be murdered ten years later. As a result of Bloody Bay and other reverses, the power of the Lords of the Isles would henceforth be greatly diminished.

== See also ==
- Fairy Flag, a MacLeod banner with supposed magical properties, is traditionally said to have been used at the battle.
