= Domhnall Dubh =

Scottish nobleman

Domhnall Dubh ("Black Donald", died 1545) was a Scottish nobleman. He was the son of Aonghas Óg, chief of Clan Donald (Clann Domhnaill), and claimant to the Lordship of the Isles, which had been held by his grandfather John of Islay, Earl of Ross (Eoin MacDomhnaill). While just an infant, Domhnall Dubh was captured by Colin Campbell, 1st Earl of Argyll and imprisoned in Innischonnel Castle in Loch Awe. He remained in captivity for most of his life. He died at Drogheda, Ireland, in 1545.

== Early life ==
Domhnall Dubh was born in the late 15th century in the Western Isles of Scotland, the son of Aonghas Óg (chief of Clan Donald) and Iseabail Ní Mheic Cailéin, a daughter of Clan Campbell. He was the grandson of John of Islay, Earl of Ross and Lord of the Isles. In 1476 John of Islay was stripped by the Scottish crown of many of his lands and titles, retaining the title Lord of the Isles, but only at the pleasure of the Crown. Domhnall's father Aonghas, disgusted by this family humiliation, turned against John of Islay, rebelling against first his father and then the Scottish crown, both of which he defeated before being murdered by his harpist in 1490. Following Aonghas' death in 1490, the crown launched a new campaign against the rebels of the north-west. Domhnall Dubh, who was then just an infant, was captured by Colin Campbell, 1st Earl of Argyll. Domhnall was imprisoned in Innischonnel Castle in Loch Awe.

== Escape from captivity ==
In 1501 Domhnall escaped, with the aid of Torcall MacLeòid, who may have had the connivance of the earl of Argyll. Torcall was looking for a way to resist the power of his enemy Alexander Gordon, the earl of Huntly, who was acting as the king's lieutenant. On 13 August 1502 a royal council decreed that Torcall was guilty of rebellion and had no right to the lands in his possession. Huntly was ordered to gather forces in the north and take possession of the MacLeòid lands. Moreover, the king prepared to deliver Eoin, now a semi-retired courtier, back to the lordship in order to counter the effect of the presence of Domhnall Dubh. Eoin, however, never made the trip. Eoin took ill and died at Dundee in 1503. Torcall and his ally Lachlan MacGill'Eain of Duart took the offensive against Huntly, and in December 1503 invaded and devastated Huntly's Lordship of Badenoch. The royal island of Bute was also attacked by the islesmen. The revolt continued until 1506, by which time Lachlan MacGill'Eain had been detached from the cause, and Huntly's forces were able to isolate Torcall and Domhnall in the Outer Hebrides. In September 1506, after just five years of freedom, Domhnall was again captured.

He remained in captivity for 37 years until he was released in 1543. The north-west rose in revolt once more. Domhnall secured an alliance with England in August 1545, swearing allegiance to Henry VIII and acknowledging the Earl of Lennox as the true regent of Scotland (rather than Regent Arran). Domhnall found himself in with a good chance of resurrecting the Lordship of the Isles. However, this chance was destroyed when Domhnall died at Drogheda, Ireland, in 1545.
