= John MacLeod (clan chief) =

Crest of Clan MacLeod

John MacLeod (Scottish Gaelic: Iain MacLeòid) was chieftain of the Isle of Lewis in the 1520s and 1530s. He is mentioned in 1528.

== Clan ancestry ==
John was the son of Torquil MacLeod, the deposed chief of Clan MacLeod of Lewis, whom the king had forfeited in 1506. John's uncle Malcolm had managed to reacquire the ancestral island. Malcolm's death, and the minority of his son Rory, enabled John to seize the entire island of Lewes and its dominions.

== Legacy ==
John was the chief ally of Domhnall 'gruamach', laird of Sleat. They warred against the MacLeods of Harris and Dunvegan. Together they expelled the MacLeods from Trotternish and prevented them from taking possession of Sleat and North Uist.

=== Family ===
John's daughter and heiress married Domhnall 'gorme' of Sleat, the son and successor of Domhnall 'gruamach'.
