= Battle of Rhunahaorine Moss =

1647 battle of the Scottish Civil War

Coordinates: 55.677°N 5.646°W

- Part of the Scottish Civil War
Date	24 May 1647
Location	Rhunahaorine Point, Kintyre, Scotland
Result	Covenanter victory

Belligerents
Royalists	Covenanters

Commanders and leaders
Alasdair MacColla	David Leslie

Strength
1,300–1,400	2,500
- Scotland

The Battle of Rhunahaorine Moss took place between Covenanters led by General David Leslie and Royalist forces led by Alasdair Mac Colla Chiotaich (Sir Alexander MacDonald) at Rhunahaorine Point, Kintyre, Scotland on 24 May 1647. The Covenanters defeated the Royalists.

Largie Castle at Rhunahaorine, home of the MacDonalds of Largie, was razed by the forces of General David Leslie.
