= Largie Castle, Tayinloan =

Coordinates: 55°39′19.52″N 5°38′56.25″W

Largie Castle is a former mansion house at Tayinloan, Kintyre, Argyll and Bute, Scotland. It was designed by architect Charles Wilson for The Hon. Augustus Moreton Macdonald and built in 1857–9. It was demolished in 1958.

According to Lady Archibald Campbell, a brownie was in occasional relevance in the mansion before the Great War: 'When guests arrive at the house who are pleasing to him, he is jubilant and makes known his pleasure by displacing the furniture in the locked room which his master has always kept for his retreat. The cup and saucer placed for him there are regarded as his special property.' He was described as being 'a neat little man, dressed in brown, with a pointed beard'.
