= Alexander Macdonald, 7th Baron Macdonald =

Alexander Godfrey Macdonald, 7th Baron Macdonald, MBE (27 June 1909 – 1970) was a grandson of Ronald Bosville-Macdonald, 6th Baron Macdonald.

Born Alexander Godfrey Bosville-Macdonald, he changed his surname to Macdonald on becoming Chief of the Name and Arms of Macdonald. On 14 June 1945, he married Anne Whitaker and they had three children:

- Janet Ann Macdonald (born 2 November 1946)
- Godfrey James Macdonald, 8th Baron Macdonald (born 28 November 1947)
- Alexander Donald Archibald Macdonald (born 3 September 1953)

Masonic offices
Preceded by Malcolm Barclay-Harvey	Grand Master of the Grand Lodge of Scotland; 1953–1957	Succeeded by The Earl of Eglinton and Winton
Honorary titles
Preceded by Donald Cameron	Lord Lieutenant of Inverness-shire; 1952–1970	Succeeded by Donald Cameron
Peerage of Ireland
Preceded by Ronald Macdonald	Baron Macdonald; 1947–1970	Succeeded by Godfrey Macdonald
