= Torquil MacLeod (clan chief) =

Chief of Clan MacLeod of Lewis (fl. c. 1500)

Torquil MacLeod (Modern Scottish Gaelic: Torcall MacLeòid), the heir of Roderick MacLeod of Lewis, was the chief of Clan MacLeod of Lewis at the end of the fifteenth century and beginning of the sixteenth century. He was the principal supporter of Domhnall Dubh, last claimant to the lordship of the Isles, in the insurrection of 1501.

Torquil continued to keep Domhnall Dubh under his protection at his stronghold of Stornoway Castle and in 1506 his lands were forfeited by order of James IV.

He was the last and most notable of the Hebridean chiefs to be subjugated by the efforts of the king and his lieutenants, Torquil’s brother-in-law, Archibald Campbell, 2nd Earl of Argyll and Alexander Gordon, 3rd Earl of Huntly. In 1506 the Castle and Domhnall Dubh were ultimately captured by the Earl of Huntly. Torquil’s fate is uncertain.

In 1511 Torquil's younger brother Malcom re-acquired the forfeited ancestral lands of Lewis. After his death, Torquil’s son and heir John regained his father’s land for a time. Torquil married (apparently as a later wife) Catharine Campbell, widow of Lachlan Og Maclean, and daughter of Colin Campbell, 1st Earl of Argyll, and the sister Mary Campbell, mother of Donald dubh.
