= Largie Castle, Rhunahaorine =

Coordinates: 55.67444°N 5.64436°W

Largie Castle
- Interactive map of the Largie Castle area

General information
- Location: Argyll and Bute, Rhunahaorine, Scotland
- Demolished: 1647

Largie Castle is a ruined castle at Rhunahaorine, Argyll and Bute, Scotland.

== History ==
The castle was built by Clan MacDonald of Largie.

After the battle of Rhunahaorine Moss, the castle was razed by the forces of General David Leslie in 1647.
