= Lord of the Isles =

Title of Scottish nobility

Lordship of the Isles
- Creation date: c. 875 AD
- Creation: Baronage of Scotland
- Present holder: Prince William, Duke of Rothesay
- Heir apparent: Prince George

Arms of Prince William, as used in Scotland. The galley in the 2nd and 3rd quarters represents the Lordship of the Isles

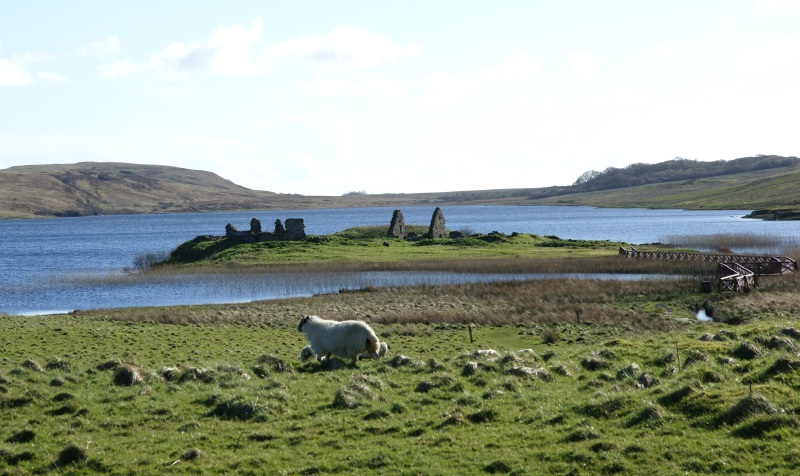
Finlaggan on Islay was the seat of the Lords of the Isles under Clan Donald.

Lord of the Isles or King of the Isles (Scottish Gaelic: Triath nan Eilean or Rìgh Innse Gall; Latin: Dominus Insularum) is a title of nobility in the Baronage of Scotland with historical roots that go back beyond the Kingdom of Scotland. It began with Somerled in the 12th century and thereafter the title was held by a series of his descendants, the Norse-Gaelic rulers of the Isle of Man and Argyll and the islands of Scotland in the Middle Ages. They wielded sea-power with fleets of galleys (birlinns). Although they were, at times, nominal vassals of the kings of Norway, Ireland, or Scotland, the island chiefs remained functionally independent for many centuries. Their territory included much of Argyll, the Isles of Arran, Bute, Islay, the Isle of Man, Hebrides (Skye and Ross from 1438), Knoydart, Ardnamurchan, and the Kintyre peninsula. At their height they were the greatest landowners and most powerful lords after the kings of England and Scotland.

The end of the MacDonald Lords came in 1493 when John MacDonald II had his ancestral homeland, estates, and titles seized by King James IV of Scotland. After that time, the MacDonald Clan contested the right of James IV to the Lordship of the Isles and uprisings and rebellions against the Scottish monarch were common. More recently, the Lordship of the Isles has been held by the Duke of Rothesay, the eldest son and heir apparent of the King of Scots, a title which, since the creation of the Kingdom of Great Britain, is usually borne by the Prince of Wales. Thus Prince William is the current Lord of the Isles.

Finlaggan on Islay was the seat of the Lords of the Isles under Somerled and Clan Donald.

== Armorials ==
The arms adopted by the Lord of the Isles varied over time, but the blazon given and illustrated in "The Armorial of Sir David Lyndsay of the Mount" (1542) is: Or, an eagle Gules displayed beaked and membered Sable, surmounted by a galley also Sable. The red eagle first appeared on the arms with Donald Macdonald, Lord of the Isles, sometimes called Donald of Harlaw, for the battle he won in 1411.

== Background ==
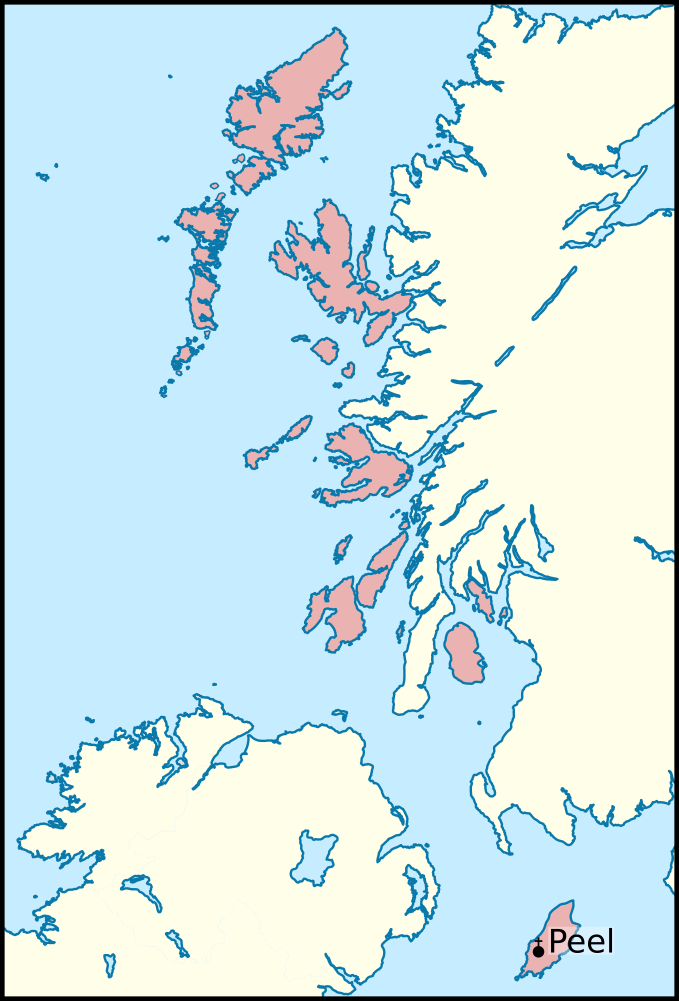
The Norwegian Diocese of the Isles, which aligns with lands that formed the Norwegian Kingdom of the Isles

The west coast and islands of present-day Scotland were inhabited by a people or peoples of uncertain cultural affiliation until the 5th century. They were invaded by Gaels from Ireland starting perhaps in the 4th century or earlier, whose language eventually predominated. In the 8th and 9th centuries this area, like others, suffered raids and invasions by Vikings from Norway, and the islands became known to the Gaels as Innse-Gall, the Islands of the Foreigners. Around 875, Norwegian jarls, or princes, came to these islands to avoid losing their independence in the course of King Harald Fairhair's unification of Norway, but Harald pursued them and conquered the Hebrides as well as Man, and the Shetland and Orkney Islands. The following year, the people of the Isles, both Gael and Norse, rebelled. Harald sent his cousin Ketill Flatnose to regain control, and Ketil then became King of the Isles. Scotland and Norway would continue to dispute overlordship of the area, with the jarls of Orkney at times seeing themselves as independent rulers.

In 973, Maccus mac Arailt, King of the Isles, Kenneth III, King of the Scots, and Máel Coluim I of Strathclyde formed a defensive alliance, but subsequently the Scandinavians defeated Gilla Adomnáin of the Isles and expelled him to Ireland. The Norse nobleman Godred Crovan became ruler of Man and the Isles, but he was deposed in 1095 by the new King of Norway, Magnus Bareleg. In 1098, Magnus entered into a treaty with King Edgar of Scotland, intended as a demarcation of their respective areas of authority. Magnus was confirmed in control of the Isles and Edgar of the mainland. Lavery cites a tale from the Orkneyinga saga, according to which King Malcolm III of Scotland offered Earl Magnus of Orkney all the islands off the west coast navigable with the rudder set. Magnus then allegedly had a skiff hauled across the neck of land at Tarbert, Loch Fyne with himself at the helm, thus including the Kintyre peninsula in the Isles' sphere of influence. (The date given falls after the end of Malcolm's reign in 1093.)

=== Founding of the dynasties ===
Somerled, Gilledomman's grandson, seized the Isles (i.e. everything except the Isle of Man and Skye) beginning in 1135 (he gained the Isle of Man in 1156) and founded a dynasty that in time became the Lords of the Isles. It is thought he had Celtic/Gaelic blood on his father's side and Norse on his mother's: his contemporaries knew him as Somerled MacGillebride, Somhairle or in Norse Sumarlidi Höld (Sumarliðr is Old Norse for "summer warrior" or "summer traveler" in the sense of a Viking). Somerled took the title Lord of Argyll, Kintyre and Lorne and eventually Rí Innse Gall (King of the Hebrides) as well as King of Mann. His origins went back to the Norse Kings of Dublin and the great Ard-Ríthe (singular: Ard-Rí), the High Kings of Ireland. They also speak of Colla Uais, a Celtic prince with influence in the Western Isles before the establishment of the kingdom of Dalriada.

After Somerled's death in 1164, three of his sons, and his brother-in-law (the King of Man), divided his realm between them:

- The King of Man: Man, Lewis, Harris, and Skye
- The sons of Somerled:
  - Angus: unclear area, perhaps the remaining northern regions
  - Dougall (ancestor of Clan MacDougall): Morvern, Ardnamurchan, and Mull
  - Ranald: unclear area, likely the southern regions, including Saddell Abbey

Angus was killed with his three sons in 1210, possibly by Ranald's sons, Ruaidhrí and Domhnall, as a result of Angus having defeated Ranald in 1192. Although Ruaidhrí originally seems to have held power in Kintyre, his later descendants held the lordship in the Hebrides and the lands that came to be known as Garmoran. It is possible that these territories were gained after Angus' death, and the annihilation of his line.

- Donald Mor McRanald, who would give his name to the Clan Donald (which would contest territory with the MacDougalls): Islay, Jura, Kintyre, Knapdale
- Rory (ancestor of Clan Macruari): Uist, Garmoran, Arran, and Bute

== The MacDonald lordship ==
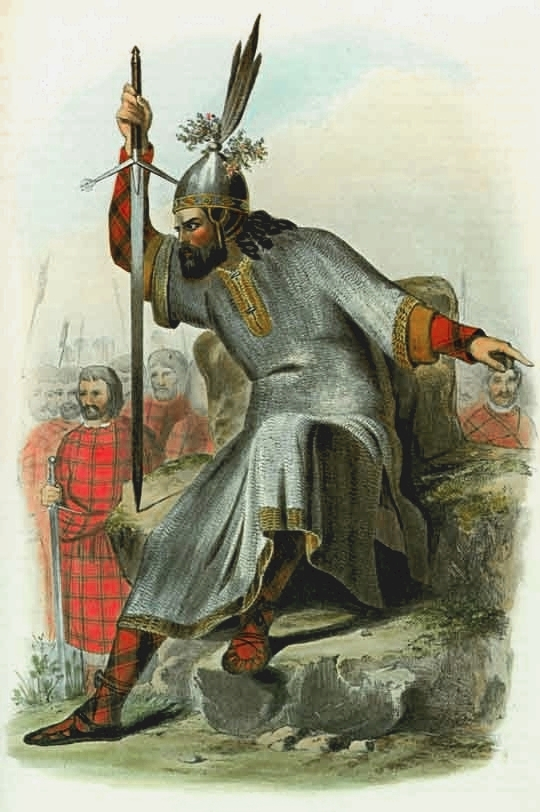
MacDonald, Lord of the Isles – a Victorian illustrator's impression

In their maritime domain the Lords of the Isles used galleys (birlinns) for both warfare and transport. Though they undoubtedly acquired longships from the Norse they defeated, the ships of the Dalriadic Scots and Irish and Islesmen predate the Viking longships and knarrs, clinker-built, though each had a square sail and rows of oars. "...literary evidence suggest[s] that the navies of the Dalriadic Scots and Irish were not insignificant". In the mid 12th century, Somerled, the first Lord of the Isles, developed the stern rudder that gave the galleys and longships sailed by the Islesmen greater maneuverability over the steering oar used by the Vikings. These ships took part in sea battles and attacked castles or hill forts almost always located close to the sea. The Lordship specified the feudal dues of its subjects in terms of numbers and sizes of the galleys (birlinns) each area had to provide in service to their Lord.

=== List of Clan Donald Lords of the Isles ===
- Somerled
- Ragnall – King of the Isles, Lord of Argyll, Lord of Kinytre
- Donald – Hebridean noble
- Angus Mor – Scottish nobleman
- Alasdair Óg of Islay – Scottish lord & clan leader (??–c.1299)
- Aonghus Og of Islay – Scottish magnate
- John of Islay I, Lord of the Isles – Lord of the Isles
- Domhnall of Islay, Lord of the Isles – Lord of the Isles and chief of the Scottish Clan Donald
- Alexander of Islay, Earl of Ross and Lord of the Isles – Scottish nobleman
- John of Islay II, Earl of Ross and Lord of the Isles
- Angus Óg – Scottish nobleman

=== Council of the Isles ===
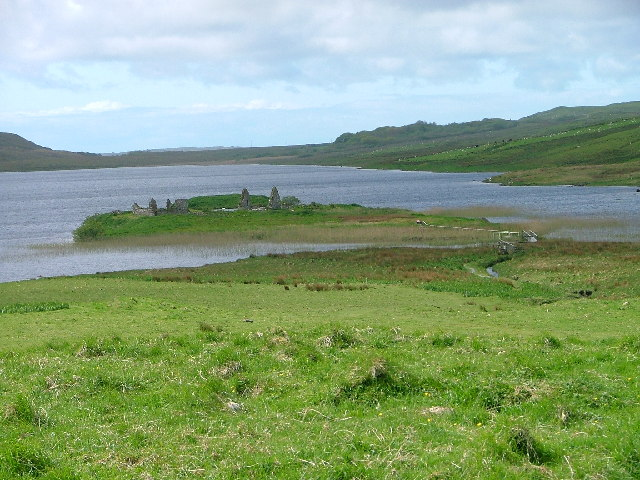
The ruins of Finlaggan Castle on Eilean Mòr, Loch Finlaggan, on the island of Islay, where the Council of the Isles met.

The Lord was advised (at least on an occasional basis) by a Council. Dean Monro of the Isles, who wrote a description of the Western Isles in 1549, described the membership as consisting of four ranks:

- Four "great men of the royal blood of Clan Donald lineally descended" (MacDonald of Clanranald, MacDonald of Dunnyvaig, MacIain of Ardnamurchan and MacDonald of Keppoch)
- Four "greatest of the nobles, called lords" (Maclean of Duart, Maclaine of Lochbuie, Macleod of Dunvegan and Macleod of the Lewes)
- Four "thanes of less living and estate" (Mackinnon of Strath, MacNeil of Barra, MacNeill of Gigha and Macquarrie of Ulva)
- "Freeholders or men that had their lands in factory" (Mackay of the Rhinns, MacNicol of Scorrybreac, MacEacharn of Kilellan, Mackay of Ugadale, Macgillivray in Mull and Macmillan of Knapdale).

In practice, membership and attendance must have varied with the times and the occasion. A commission granted in July 1545 by Domhnall Dubh, claimant to the Lordship, identified the following members:

- Hector Maclean of Duart
- John Macdonald of Clanranald
- Ruari Macleod of the Lewes
- Alexander Macleod of Dunvegan
- Murdoch Maclaine of Lochbuie
- Allan Maclean of Torloisk
- Archibald Macdonald, Captain of Clann Uisdein
- Alexander MacIan of Ardnamurchan
- John Maclean of Coll
- Gilleonan MacNeil of Barra
- Ewen Mackinnon of Strath
- John MacQuarrie of Ulva
- John Maclean of Ardgour
- Alexander Macdonell of Glengarry
- Angus Macdonald of Knoydart
- Donald Maclean of Kingairloch
- Angus Macdonald, brother of James Macdonald of Dunnyveg.

== End of the MacDonald lordship ==
Successive Lords of the Isles fiercely asserted their independence from Scotland, acting as kings of their territories well into the 15th century. Then in 1462, John MacDonald II Lord of the Isles signed a treaty with Edward IV of England to conquer Scotland with him and the Earl of Douglas. The treaty between Edward IV and John II has been used to show how the MacDonald Lords were viewed as independent rulers of their kingdom, freely entering into national and military treaties with foreign governments. Unfortunately for the MacDonald sovereigns, the civil war in England, known as the Wars of the Roses, prevented the completion of the alliance between Edward IV and John II. Upon the discovery of his alliance with Edward IV in 1493, John II had his ancestral lands, estates, and titles taken from him by James IV of Scotland. In addition to James IV seeking revenge on John II, he possessed a larger military force and was able to impose his will on the West Coast of Scotland, though uprisings and rebellions were common. Though the Lordship was taken away from the MacDonald family in the 15th century, waves of successive MacDonald leaders have contested this and fought for its revival ever since, notably during Dubh's Rebellion. Since then, the eldest sons of the reigning Scottish (and later British) monarchs has been styled "Lord of the Isles", essentially merging the crowns of Dal Riada with the Pictish East of Scotland. The office itself has been extinct since the 15th century and the style since then has no other meaning but to recall the Scottish seizure of the ancient Norse-Gaelic lordship and crown. Currently William, Prince of Wales is titular Lord of the Isles, as well as Duke of Rothesay, Earl of Carrick, Baron of Renfrew and Prince and Great Steward of Scotland. His wife Catherine likewise has the titular female equivalent, Lady of the Isles.

== See also ==
- Lord of Islay
- Kingdom of the Isles – Norse-Gaelic polity in the British Isles (849–1265)
- Donald Dubh – Scottish nobleman
- Battle of Harlaw – 1411 Scottish clan battle
