= John of Islay, Earl of Ross =

John of Islay
- Earl of Ross and Lord of the Isles
- Reign: 1449–1476/1493
- Predecessor: Alexander of Islay
- Born: 1434
- Died: 1503 (aged 68–69); Dundee
- Burial: Either Scone or Paisley Abbey
- Spouse: Elizabeth Livingstone
- Issue: Angus Óg
- House: Clan Donald
- Father: Alexander of Islay
- Mother: Elizabeth Seton

John of Islay (or John MacDonald) (1434–1503), Earl of Ross, fourth (and last) Lord of the Isles, and Mac Domhnaill (chief of Clan Donald), was a pivotal figure in late medieval Scotland: specifically in the struggle for power with James Stewart, James III of Scotland, in the remoter formerly Norse-dominated regions of the kingdom. His defeat in this conflict led to rebellion against John by his illegitimate son Angus Óg, resulting in the defeat of John's fleet at the Battle of Bloody Bay in the early 1480s. Thereafter and until his death in 1503 John remained an inconsequential figure while, until his murder in 1490, Angus continued to dominate the affairs of Clan Donald. In 1493 James IV brought the Lordship of the Isles to an end.

== Early life ==
John was born to Alexander of Islay, Earl of Ross and Lord of the Isles, and Elizabeth, daughter of Alexander Seton the lord of Gordon and Huntly. He succeeded to his father's territories in 1449 while a still a minor.

== Marriage ==
John's marriage to Elizabeth Livingstone had been determined by the usual calculations of profit and position, as were those of other important people of the time. There was one important difference with the alliance of John and Elizabeth: he came from a great landed family. Elizabeth was the daughter of Sir James Livingstone, a powerful politician during the minority of James II, but in a conservative, land-based society. John, with a large following at his heels, rich as he was, always craved more land. Sir James' power was purely personal.

== Rebellion against the King ==
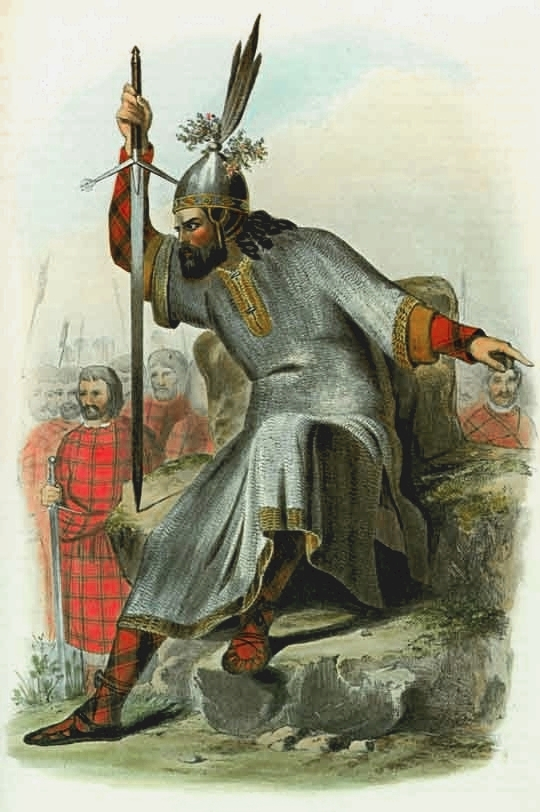
MacDonald, The Lord of the Isles – a romanticised Victorian illustrator's impression

Soon after his disgrace Sir James took refuge with his son-in-law. John at once rose in revolt, taking the royal castles of Inverness, Urquhart and Ruthven, perhaps less to show his support for the Livingstones than to remind the king of his own power in the north.

=== Treaties and Allies ===
This revolt of the Lord of the Isles came at a dangerous time for the king, who was involved in a virtual civil war with the Earl of Douglas, the most powerful noble in southern Scotland. Ross and Douglas along with Alexander Lindsay, 4th Earl of Crawford had formed a bond 'against all men, including the king'. This was taken as a direct threat to the king's rule. Whether there was an intention to depose King James is open to question. Having learned of the bond, King James invited the Earl of Douglas to Stirling in February 1452 have to the matter out between them. Douglas refused to appear without safe conduct under the royal seal, indicating that he had serious concerns about his safety. When they met, King James demanded that the earl break the bond. The earl defied the royal command and the king, with the assistance of several of his closest companions, killed him. Most historians believe this murder was not planned.

John showed little concern for the fate of his ally, especially as James effectively turned a blind eye to the occupation of the northern castles. His relations with the crown continued to improve and he did nothing to prevent the final destruction of the house of Douglas in 1455, even obtaining title to some of their border estates. The sudden and unexpected death of James in 1460 brought an early change of direction. Soon after the accession of James III, John received a proposal that was to lead to his eventual ruin.

== Ardtornish and Westminster ==
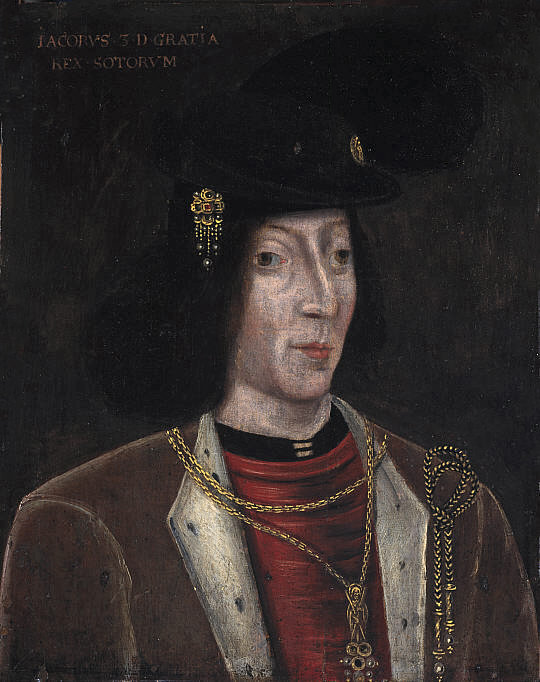
James III of Scotland, whose power would ultimately eclipse that of the Lords of the Isles

So far John had done rather well. He had defied the king and survived. He extended his power and influence from Inverness to the English border. Had he died at this point he might be well remembered in the annals of Clan Donald. But he now took a fatal step, the consequences of which were to betray the essential weakness of his character. In England the Yorkists under Edward IV had chased the Lancastrian Henry VI from the country. Henry took refuge in Scotland, where he was well received. Edward at once sent the exiled earl of Douglas, the brother of the man murdered at Stirling, on a diplomatic mission to the Isles. At his court in the castle of Ardtornish John agreed to send his plenipotentiaries to London. This was a dangerous move, for while John's predecessors had contacts with the English, they had never committed themselves too far. Moreover, the English had never made any real attempt to assist the Lordship when it was in difficulties with the crown of Scotland. It should have been perfectly clear that Edward was trying to create a diversion. Sadly, for the Lord of the Isles, it was not.

In February 1462 John's representatives concluded an agreement once referred to as the Treaty of Westminster-Ardtornish, that envisaged nothing less than the conquest and partition of Scotland. John agreed to pay homage to Edward in return for his help in obtaining all of Scotland north of the Forth. The treaty is a remarkably vague document considering the risks John was prepared to take. It says absolutely nothing about the nature, scale and timing of English support. But for Edward it was a brilliant diplomatic coup. He achieved maximum results at minimum expense, laying out only as much bait as necessary to create a political disturbance in northern Scotland.

Even before the agreement was concluded the Islemen took to arms, advancing eastwards under the command of Angus Og, John's illegitimate son. Once again Inverness was captured and the people of the north instructed to deny the authority of James III. Beyond this we know nothing from the sparse contemporary sources, not even how this rebellion was brought under control. It most certainly had the effect Edward desired; for the Scottish government, faced with rebellion in the north, and fearful of attack in the south, dropped the politically embarrassing Lancastrian connection. John, presumably now aware how worthless the Westminster agreement truly was, backed down, declaring his seizure of the Inverness customs had been illegal. No further action was taken against him – for the present.

== Angus Óg and Bloody Bay ==
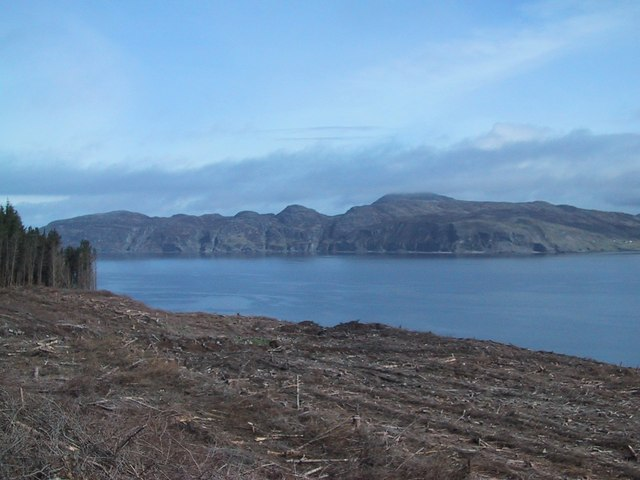
Bloody Bay

In the mid-1470s Edward, preparing for a war with France, and anxious for good relations with Scotland, finally revealed the full terms of the Westminster treaty. John was summoned before parliament to answer for his treasons, and when he failed to appear was declared forfeit. With no allies, either at home or abroad, John had little choice but to make his peace with the king in the summer of 1476. Considering the full extent of his treason, far greater than that which had destroyed the Border Douglases, he was treated with comparative leniency. He lost the earldom of Ross – with the Isle of Skye – as well as Knapdale and Kintyrebut retained control of the Hebrides. The designation of Lord of the Isles, moreover, was from this point forward to be granted by the crown, rather than self-assumed.

But John had lost much more than land – he lost prestige and standing among his own kin. The Lordship had always depended on territorial expansion to give life to its warrior values; but now that it was contracting all of the latent tensions came forth, finding expression in the person of Angus Óg. Angus, according to Hugh Macdonald, ejected John both from the leadership of the clan and from his own home, forcing him to seek shelter under an old boat, and precipitating a bitter civil war. John managed to raise an army of his own against his son, and his fleet of galleys met those of Angus sometime in the early 1480s – we cannot be more precise than that – off the coast of Mull to the north-west of the present town of Tobermory, an area ever afterwards to be known as Bloody Bay. The Battle of Bloody Bay was a complete victory for Angus, who continued to dominate the affairs of Clan Donald up to his murder in 1490.

== Twilight ==
What happened to John immediately after Bloody Bay is uncertain, but Scottish historian Richard D. Oram has noted that following Angus' victory, "John was no longer able to perform the vital function of maintaining stability in the west, and, as divisions deepened, the writing was on the wall for the lordship." As recorded in the Annals of Loch Cé, his son, Angus Óg, was murdered by his Irish harper, Diarmait MacCairbre, in 1490. With the death of Angus, John re-emerged from the shadows, but his "feebleness of character and the lawlessness of his chieftains" led him to bestow lordship of the Isles on his nephew, Alexander Lochalsh. Alexander tried to re-establish control over the earldom of Ross, but was defeated by the Mackenzies, a leading local family, at the Battle of the Park. In 1493, the Parliament of King James IV of Scotland finally brought the independent Lordship of the Isles to an end, and John spent the remainder of his life in the Lowlands as a pensioner of the king. He died in Dundee in 1503 and is believed to have been buried at Scone. According to tradition, he was laid to rest, at his own request, in the tomb of Robert II, his royal ancestor.

The final blow came in 1540 when James V annexed Islay and the other Isles to the Crown.

== Legacy ==
It is difficult to know what to make of John of the Isles, the man who was destined to preside over the ruin of a great inheritance. He appears to have had an odd assortment of qualities, sometimes assertive and arrogant, other times weak and submissive. Hugh Macdonald, the seventeenth century historian of Clan Donald, says that he was "a meek, modest man . . . and a scholar more fit to be a churchman than to command so many irregular tribes of people."

His wife, Elizabeth Livingstone, accused him of trying to murder her while she was pregnant. He started his rule as a lion and ended as a sheep, having in the process alienated almost everyone, including the closest members of his family.

He fathered illegitimately:

- John Macdonald
- Margaret Macdonald. She married Kenneth Mackenzie, 8th of Kintail, son of Alexander Mackenzie, 7th of Kintail and Anna Margaret Macdougall.
- Aonghas Óg Macdonald. He married Lady Mary Campbell, daughter of Colin Campbell, 1st Earl of Argyll and Isabel Stewart. He was murdered in 1490.

== Notes ==
Preceded by Alexander of Islay	Earl of Ross; 1449–1476	Vacant Forfeit Title next held by James Stewart
Preceded by Alexander of Islay	Lord of the Isles; 1449–1493	Forfeit
