= Aonghas Óg =

Scottish nobleman

Aonghas Óg (died 1490) was a Scottish nobleman who was the last independent Lord of the Isles. Aonghas became a rebel against both his father and the Scottish crown, in a civil clan war which would see the end of the independent Lordship of the Isles.

== Biography ==
Aonghas was born the bastard son of John MacDonald, Earl of Ross a.k.a. (John of Islay, Lord of the Isles). In time, Aonghas would become a rebel against both his father and against the Scottish crown.

In 1476, a secret treaty that was made by Aonghas's father, John MacDonald, with King Edward IV of England was discovered by King James III of Scotland, who then stripped MacDonald of his earldom, as well as the sheriffdoms of Nairn and Inverness, and the lordships of Kintyre and Knapdale; the King however confirmed MacDonald with the remainder of his lands and the title Lord of the Isles. It appears that Aonghas, as MacDonald's heir, was not prepared to accept this settlement. Aonghas campaigned to regain Ross and the other lost dominions. At first, he may have been supported by his father, but this did not last. Aonghas married Lady Mary Campbell, daughter of Colin Campbell, 1st Earl of Argyll and Isabel Stewart.

Macdonald, his prestige in tatters, was driven from Islay by his son Aonghas. However, he managed to gather support among the MacGill'Eain ("MacLean") kindred of Duart, the MacLeoid kindred of Lewis and Harris, and the MacNeill kindred of Barra, as well as the support of the Scottish crown and John Stewart, Earl of Atholl; but, Aonghas had the important support of Domhnall Ballach and the rest of the MacDomhnaill kindred.

=== Rebellion and war ===
Aonghas gathered his forces and those of his allies against the armies of his father, and a great sea battle took place near Tobermory, the Battle of the Bloody Bay, probably in the year 1481, in which Aonghas defeated the galleys of his father's west highland allies. In the same year, another battle took place at Lagabraad, in which Aonghas defeated a royal army led by the Earl of Atholl. According to Hugh MacDonald's History of the MacDonalds, 517 of Atholl's men were slain. Aonghas followed up his victory by retaking control of Dingwall Castle and Easter Ross.

Aonghas had benefitted from political distractions in the south. By 1483 those distractions were over, and the earl of Atholl and earl of Huntly were able to bring their presence to bear on the north, forcing Aonghas to retreat back to the west. However, the great magnate rebellion of 1488 gave Aonghas another chance to move east and Aonghas was able to seize control of Inverness.

== Death and legacy ==
In 1490 Aonghas had his throat cut while he was sleeping. The murderer was his harpist, Diarmaid O'Cairbre, who carried out the act for reasons which remain unclear. Following Aonghas' death, the crown launched a new campaign against the power of the Lord of the Isles, and Aonghas' son Domhnall Dubh was captured by Colin Campbell, 1st Earl of Argyll. Aonghas' death would see the effective end of the independent Lordship of the Isles. Henceforth the power of the House of Stuart and the Crown of Scotland would be greatly increased. Aonghas left a daughter named Màiri, from whom the Scottish Gaelic Bard Alasdair Mac Mhaighstir Alasdair was descended.
