= Mac Amhalghaidh =

- Mac Amhalghaidh in Gaelic script
- Gender: Masculine
- Language: Irish

Other gender
- Feminine: Nic Amhalghaidh, Bean Mhic Amhalghaidh, Mhic Amhalghaidh

Origin
- Language: Irish
- Meaning: "son of Amhalghaidh", "son of Amhalghadh"

Other names
- Variant forms: Mac Amhalaí, Mac Amhalaidh, Mac Amhalghadha, Mag Amhalghaidh, Mag Amhalghadha
- Cognate: MacAmhalghaidh
- See also: Mac Amhlaoibh

Mac Amhalghaidh is an Irish masculine surname. The name translates into English as "son of Amhalghadh". The surname originated as a patronym, however it no longer refers to the actual name of the bearer's father. The form of the surname for unmarried women is Nic Amhalghaidh. The forms for married women are Bean Mhic Amhalghaidh and Mhic Amhalghaidh. The Irish Mac Amhalghaidh has numerous Anglicised forms. The surname has been borne by at least one notable Irish family.

A cognate of Mac Amhalghaidh is the Scottish Gaelic MacAmhalghaidh; the feminine form of which is NicAmhalghaidh.

There are several variant forms of the name. A modern variant is Mac Amhalaí. Another is Mac Amhalaidh. Another variant is Mac Amhalghadha. Variant forms of Mac Amhalghaidh and Mac Amhalghadha include Mag Amhalghaidh and Mag Amhalghadha.

== Etymology ==
Mac Amhalghaidh translates into English as "son of Amhalghaidh", or "son of Amhalghadh". The surname originated as a patronym, however it no longer refers to the actual name of the bearer's father. The personal name Amhalghaidh, also spelt Amhalghadh, is an old Gaelic name, and is of uncertain origin and meaning.

== Feminine forms ==
Mac Amhalghaidh is a masculine surname. The form of this surname for unmarried women is Nic Amhalghaidh. This feminine surname is actually a contracted form of iníon Mhic Amhalghaidh, which translates into English as "daughter of Mac Amhalghaidh". The form of the surname for married women is Bean Mhic Amhalghaidh, which translates into English as "wife of Mac Amhalghaidh"; this feminine surname can also be represented in the contracted form Mhic Amhalghaidh.

== Gaelic cognate ==
A cognate of the Irish Mac Amhalghaidh is the Scottish Gaelic MacAmhalghaidh. The feminine form of this Scottish Gaelic surname is NicAmhalghaidh. This feminine name is composed of the prefix Nic-, which is an abbreviated form of the Scottish Gaelic nighean mhic or nì mhic, which translates into English as "daughter of the son"; thus NicAmhalghaidh translates as "daughter of MacAmhalghaidh".

== Variant forms ==
Mac Amhalaí

A modern variant form of Mac Amhalghaidh is Mac Amhalaí. This surname is rendered for unmarried women as Nic Amhalaí. The form for married women is Bean Mhic Amhalaí, or simply Mhic Amhalaí.

Mac Amhalaidh

Another variant is Mac Amhalaidh. This surname is rendered for unmarried women as Nic Amhalaidh. The form for married women is Bean Mhic Amhalaidh, or simply Mhic Amhalaidh.

Mac Amhalghadha

Another variant of the surname is Mac Amhalghadha. This surname is rendered for unmarried women as Nic Amhalghadha. The form for married women is Bean Mhic Amhalghadha, or simply Mhic Amhalghadha.

Mag Amhalghaidh, Mag Amhalghadha

Variant forms of Mac Amhalghaidh and Mac Amhalghadha are Mag Amhalghaidh and Mag Amhalghadha. These surnames are rendered for unmarried women as Nig Amhalghaidh and Nig Amhalghadha. The form for married women are Bean Mhig Amhalghaidh and Bean Mhig Amhalghadha; or simply Mhig Amhalghaidh and Mhig Amhalghadha.

== Anglicised forms ==
There are numerous Anglicised forms of the surname. Anglicisations in use today include Cauley, Cawley, Macally, MacAlley, MacAulay, MacAuley, MacAuliffe, Maccally, MacCauley, MacCawley, and MacCowley, MacGawley, and Magawley. Many of these English-language surnames also have unrelated origins. For example, in many cases the Irish Mac Amhlaoibh has been Anglicised into identical forms. Anglicised forms of Mag Amhalghaidh and Mag Amhalghadha include Gawley, MacGaulay, MacGawlay, MacGawley, and Magawley. An Anglicised form of the Irish Mac Amhalaidh is MacGauley.

== Families ==
The surname has been borne by several Irish families. The most notable of these was a particular family that was historically seated in what is today County Westmeath, Ireland. The leadership of the family had once been the powerful lords of Calraighe. According to Edward MacLysaght, this family's eponymous ancestor of this family lived in the 13th century. A pedigree of the family is recorded stretching back to Niall of the Nine Hostages, a semi-legendary High King of Ireland.

In Scotland, the unrelated MacAulays of Ardincaple (also known as "Clan MacAulay") derived their surname from MacAmhalghaidh, the Scottish Gaelic form of the surname. The early ancestry of the MacAulays is uncertain, although their surname may ultimately be linked to members of the original family of the Earls of Lennox, who bore the name Amhalghaidh / Amhalghadh. The MacAulays of Ardincaple were historically seated at Ardincaple Castle, within territory dominated by the early Earls of Lennox.
