= Macaulay =

Macaulay, MacAulay, or McAulay may refer to:

== Name ==
=== Surname ===
- Macaulay (surname), an English-language surname with multiple etymological origins (also includes surnames Macauley, MacAulay and McAulay).

== People ==
=== Surname ===
- Thomas Babington Macaulay, 1st Baron Macaulay, British historian and Whig politician who played a major (and controversial) role in reforming education in India.
- List of people with surnames Macaulay, MacAulay or McAulay

=== Given name ===
- Macaulay Culkin, American actor
- Macaulay Langstaff, English footballer

== Places ==
- Macaulay River, in the South Island of New Zealand
- Macaulay railway station, Melbourne, Victoria, Australia
- The Macaulay Institute, a land use research institute based in Aberdeen, Scotland
- William E. Macaulay Honors College, a school which is part of City University of New York, in New York, USA
- MacAulay Field, Canadian football stadium in Sackville, NS, Canada

== Families ==
- Clan MacAulay, a Scottish clan historically seated at Ardincaple Castle, in Scotland.
- Macaulay family of Lewis, a Scottish family historically centred on Lewis in the Outer Hebrides, in Scotland.

== Mathematics ==
- Cohen–Macaulay ring, a commutative ring, named after Irvin Cohen and Francis Sowerby Macaulay (1862-1937).
- Macaulay computer algebra system, a computer algebra system, named after Francis Sowerby Macaulay (1862-1937).
- Macaulay2, a free computer algebra system, which is a successor of the preceding.
- Macaulay matrix, a generalization of Sylvester matrix to n homogeneous polynomials in n variables.
- Macaulay brackets, a notation used to describe the ramp function.
- Macaulay Duration, a special case of bond duration, named after Frederick Macaulay (1882-1970).

== Other ==
- Macaulay Cup, Scottish shinty cup
- Macaulay Library, animal sound library
- MacAulay and Co, BBC Radio Scotland daily magazine

== See also ==
- McAuley (disambiguation)
- McCauley (disambiguation)
- Macaulayism, named after Thomas Babinage Macauly, colonial policy of liquidating indigenous culture
- Aulay
- Maulay, France
- Peter de Maulay (died 1241) counsellor to King John
