= McCulley =

McCulley is a surname. Notable people with the surname include:

- Bob McCulley (1914–1993), Canadian professional ice hockey right winger
- Bobby McCulley (born 1952), Scottish footballer
- Danielle McCulley (born 1975), former professional basketball player
- Donaven McCulley (born 2003), American football player
- Johnston McCulley (1883–1958), author and creator of the character Zorro
- Kate McCulley (born 1984) is an American travel blogger
- Michael J. McCulley (born 1943), former NASA astronaut and first submariner in space
- Paul McCulley (born 1957), managing director at PIMCO
- Pete McCulley (1931–1992), head coach of the San Francisco 49ers in the 1978 season
- Terence McCulley (born 1957), the former United States Ambassador to The Ivory Coast

== See also ==
- McCulley Township, Boyd County, Nebraska, United States
- McCulley Township, Emmons County, North Dakota, a former U.S. township
- McAlley
- McAuley (disambiguation)
- McCauley (disambiguation)
- McCully
