= Macaulay family of Lewis =

Scottish clan

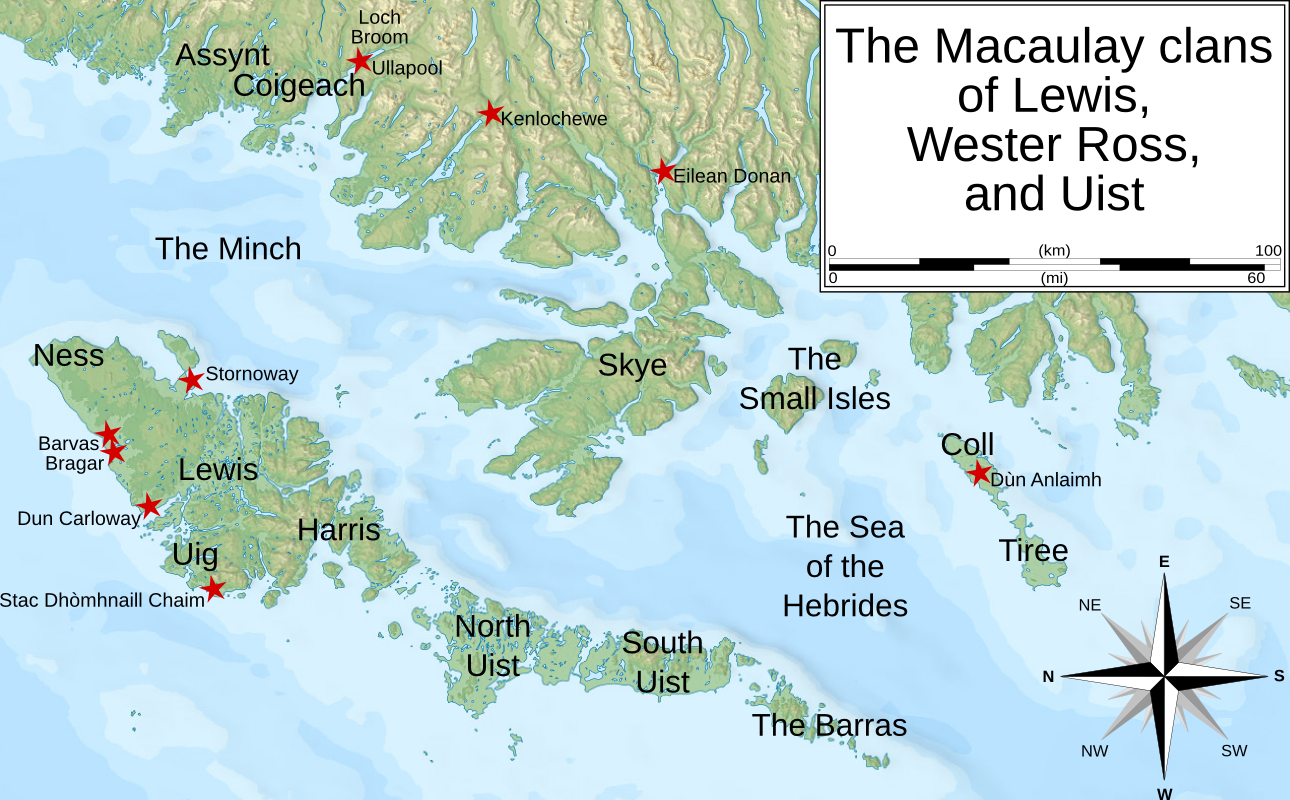
Locations mentioned within the article (click to enlarge). The Lewis Macaulays were centred at Uig, on the Isle of Lewis. The Wester Ross Macaulays have been associated with Loch Broom and Ullapool. The Uist MacAulays were centred on the Uists; though they were said to have incomers from the Small Isles.

The Macaulay family of Uig in Lewis, known in Scottish Gaelic as Clann mhic Amhlaigh, were a small family located around Uig on the Isle of Lewis in the Outer Hebrides of Scotland. There is no connection between the Macaulays of Lewis and Clan MacAulay which was centred in the Loch Lomond area, bordering the Scottish Highlands and Scottish Lowlands. The Macaulays of Lewis are generally said to be of Norse origin because of the etymology of their surname and also because of the islands' Viking Age past. However, a recent analysis of the Y-DNA of men with Scottish surnames has shown that a large number of Hebridean Macaulays are of Irish origin. In the 17th century, however, tradition gave the Macaulays an Irish (or Gaelic) origin. By the end of the 16th century the dominant clan on Lewis was Clan Macleod of The Lewes. Other notable Lewis clans were the somewhat smaller Morrisons of Ness and the even less numerous Macaulays of Uig. The Macaulays were centred in the area surrounding Uig on the western coast of Lewis, and had a deadly, long-standing feud with the Morrisons, whose lands were located on the northern coast around Ness. Today the Lewis surname Macaulay is considered to be a sept name of the Macleods of Lewis. There are two other nearby clans of Macaulays who may, or may not, be connected to the Lewis clan—the Wester Ross Macaulays, and the Uist MacAulays.

== Origins ==
=== Etymology of the name and the persistence of Norse in Lewis ===
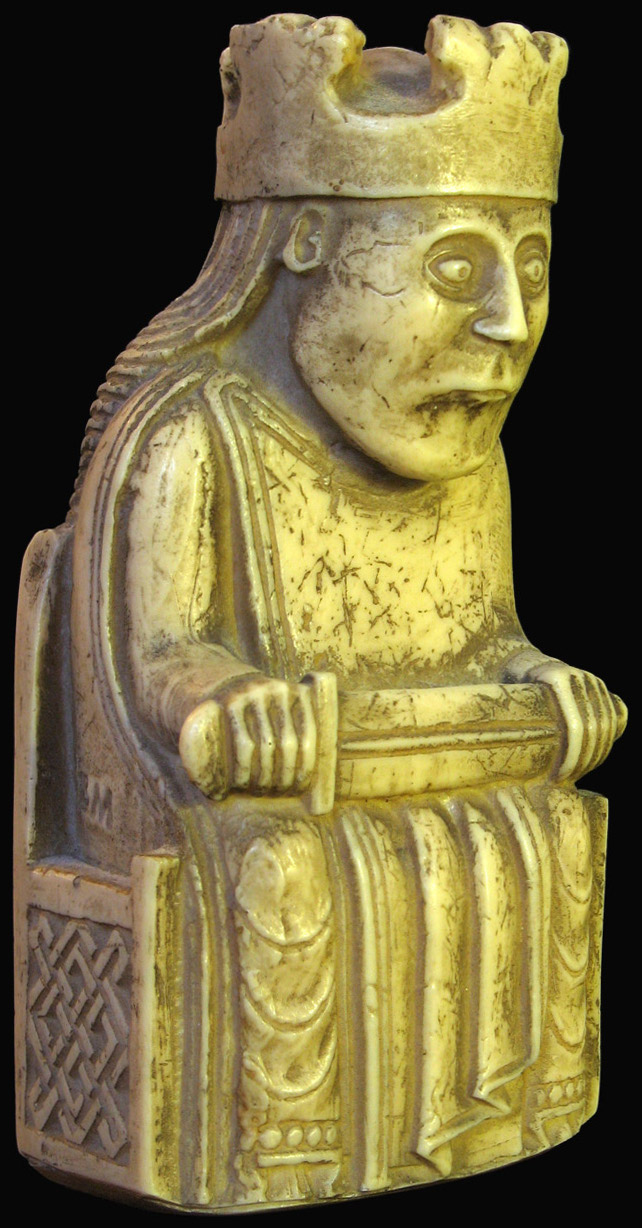
The Lewis Chessmen were discovered in the parish of Uig, on Lewis, in 1831. They are thought to have been made in Scandinavia, in the late 12th century, when the Outer Hebrides were a part of the Kingdom of Norway.

The surname Macaulay, when found in the Scottish Hebrides, is thought to be derived from the Scottish Gaelic MacAmhlaidh, which is a patronymic form of the Amhlaidh / Amhladh. These names are ultimately derived from Gaelic forms of the Old Norse personal-name Áleifr and Óláfr. The personal name Óláfr is derived from the Old Norse anu, meaning "ancestor"; and liefr, meaning "heir", "descendant". The name was popular among the Norsemen and is common in the mediaeval Icelandic manuscripts: the Flateyjarbók and also the Landnámabók which details the original Norse settlement of Iceland in the 9th and 10th centuries. It was the name of Saint Olaf (995–1030), an early king of Norway who encouraged the spread of Christianity within his kingdom. The name was also a royal name among the mediaeval kings of Mann and the Isles.

The use of personal-names and place-names may hint at the level of Norse control in the islands and coasts of Scotland. From the Viking Age on, the Hebrides were known to the Gaels as Innse Gall, meaning the "Isles of the Foreigners". The analysis of the Norse place-names containing settlement elements, within the Hebrides, shows that they most often occur in Lewis and Skye. About 79 percent of the village-names in Lewis are considered to be purely Norse and in Skye it is about 66 percent. The frequency of such names diminishes dramatically in the lands and islands to the south. According to archaeologist Iain Crawford, the use of Norse personal-names and patronymic-names on Lewis, Harris, Skye and the adjacent mainland may also hint at the level of influence, or persistence of the language. Crawford noted that the use of such 'Norse' names in these areas was in complete contrast to the adjacent islands and lands to the south. He added that this pattern seems to be echoed by the distribution of Norse loan-words in Gaelic. In consequence, Crawford has argued that the use of Norse may have persisted in Lewis and Harris, in some form, until the 15th century.

A recent analysis of Y-DNA of men with Scottish surnames has revealed that a large genetic lineage of men with the surname Macaulay, many of whom are from Lewis and Harris, have their genetic origins in the south-west of Ireland. The specific Y-DNA marker borne by these men appears to be extremely rare in Scotland, where it is only found in the Western Isles, and the Northern Isles. One hypothesis, suggested by population geneticist Jim Wilson and author Alistair Moffat, is that this marker may represent Irish slaves brought to Scotland by the Vikings. According to Wilson, this may explain why such a distinctive Irish marker is found areas where Vikings were once active, and why it is borne by Scots with surnames of Norse origin. Scottish radio presenter Fred MacAulay is one of the men who has been found to bear this marker. According to Moffat, there is a larger and unrelated genetic lineage of men with the same surname. The genetic marker of these men suggests that they descend from Vikings.

=== Traditional origins of the clan ===
According to Rev. William Matheson, the eponymous ancestors of most west highland clans first appear in around the 13th century. At the beginning of the 13th century Lewis was under Norse control. The mediaeval manuscript known as the Chronicles of Mann shows that at least one eminent Óláfr had connections with Lewis at this time—Olaf the Black—who would later become King of Man and the Isles. Today the Macaulays of Lewis are generally said to be of Norse descent, and in consequence a favourite modern tradition of theirs is a descent from Olaf the Black. However, according to Matheson, there is no real evidence for any descendants of Olaf the Black to have lived on Lewis. A tradition of the Macaulays of Uig was that they descended from "Magnus, King of Norway"; the family of the Victorian era historian and politician, Lord Macaulay (also descendants of the Macaulays of Uig) termed him "Olaus Magnus, King of Norway". Matheson was of the opinion that the name Magnus may possibly be significant because Olaf the Black had a son so named. The 19th-century historian, Thomas, wrote that there was no real tradition among the Macaulays of Lewis as to their eponymous ancestor. Thomas maintained that the claim of descent from Olaf, King of Mann was an example of "historical induction": where a historical figure is grafted on to a tradition. Thomas also showed that in the 17th century the belief on Lewis was that the Macaulays descended from an Irishman. Olaf the Black has also been claimed as ancestor of the Macleods and Morrisons of Lewis, as well.

==== Origins according to the 'Indweller' of Lewis ====
In the late 17th century, the origin of the clan was documented within an historical account of Lewis written by John Morrison of Bragar, 'Indweller' of Lewis. According to Matheson, the Indweller's own mother was a Macaulay. The Indweller wrote this account sometime between about 1678 and 1688 and stated that the early inhabitants of Lewis were three men from three separate races.

The first and most antient Inhabitants of this Countrie were three men of three severall races viz. Mores the son of Kenannus whom the Irish historiance call Makurich whom they make to be Naturall Sone to one of the Kings of Noruvay. some of whose posteritie remains in the land to this day. All Morisones in Scotland may challenge there descent from this man. The second was Iskair Mac.Awlay ane Irish man whose posteritie remain likvise to this day in the Lews. The third was Macknaicle whose onlie daughter Torquill the first of that name (and sone to Claudius the sone of Olipheous, who likewise is said to be the King of Noruway his sone,) did violentlie espouse, and cutt off Immediatlie the whole race of Macknaicle and possessed himself with the whole Lews and continueth to his posteritie (Macleud of Lews) dureing 13 or 14 generations and so extinct before, or at least about the year 1600 the maner of his decay I omitt because I intend no historie but a descriptione.

— John Morrison of Bragar, A Descriptione of the Lews.

The name which the Indweller gave as Iskair is rendered in Scottish Gaelic as Sgàire. This traditional masculine Gaelic name has been Anglicised in various forms of the Biblical name Zechariah. This Gaelic name is peculiar to the Macaulays of Lewis, and to this day it, and its Anglicised forms, are still used by the clan. The Hebridean genealogist Bill Lawson stated that as far as he was aware, the Bernera branch of the Lewis Macaulays was the only branch to still use the name Sgàire. There is, however, little known about this Gaelic name; it is thought to be of Norse origin, however there is no known Norse personal-name that would correspond to Sgàire. One possible origin of the name is the Old Norse skári, meaning "sea mew", "young sea mew" (from this Old Norse word comes the Scottish Gaelic sgàireag, which has a similar meaning). Alexander Macbain and William J. Watson stated that the Norse word was also used as a byname; later Matheson speculated that the Gaelic personal name Sgàire could have begun as a nickname for an individual. This Gaelic name appears in that of an old (possibly pre-Reformation) chapel—Cill Sgaire—in Bragar. A form of it may also appear on North Uist, in the place-names of Loch Scarie and Dun Scarie, near Hoghagearraidh.

The Indweller's account made no mention of a royal ancestry to the Macaulays, but instead gave them an Irish ancestry. When noting this and the name Iskair, the 19th-century historian William C. Mackenzie pointed out that the Icelandic Irskar means "Irish" (in fact, the Old Norse írskr means "Irish", and it has recently been concluded that this term could be used in Old Norse sources to refer to not only the native Irish, but also to Scandinavians from Ireland). Matheson, however, made no note of this when he stated that he considered it was possible that the Indweller gave an Irish descent to the Macaulays because there are numerous clans in Ireland with Gaelic names which can equate to Macaulay (see Mac Amhlaoibh and Mac Amhalghaidh). Matheson also noted that the Indweller's account may reveal the two earliest names in the Macaulay's traditional genealogy—"Awlay" and "Iskair". Thomas took the Indweller less literally than Matheson; and considered that when the Indweller wrote "Irish" and "Irishman" in the 17th century, these terms would equate to "Gaelic" and "Gael" in more modern times.

=== Earliest attested Macaulays ===
It has been said that the first Macaulay of Lewis on record is Dòmhnall Cam, in 1610. However, there appear to be two Macaulays recorded as witnessing a 1572 record of sasine, following a grant of land to Torcail Conanach Macleod. The document, unknown to Matheson, records the names of "Johanno roy [mcRore] mcLachlayne McOler", and "Murdo mcRorie mcLachlayne". According to Aonghas MacCoinnich, the name McOler would appear to be Macaulay, likely meaning that these were Uig Macaulays. The Lewis traditions, gathered by Thomas in the 19th century, had an Iain Ruadh, as grandfather to the Macaulay hero Dòmhnall Cam (see sections below). However, Dòmhnall Cam is on record in 1610 ("Donald Cam McCoull and Mulcallum McCoull"), and Thomas's traditional genealogy implausibly puts his grandfather in the 1450s. MacCoinnich noted that the traditions noted by Thomas seemed to link the Macaulays of Lewis to Wester Ross and Loch Broom; and although any real connection may have been forgotten by tradition, the Macleod trans-Minch lordship would have made such connection quite possible. See Wester Ross Macaulays below, for more info on the Wester Ross Macaulays.

== Hebridean feuds ==
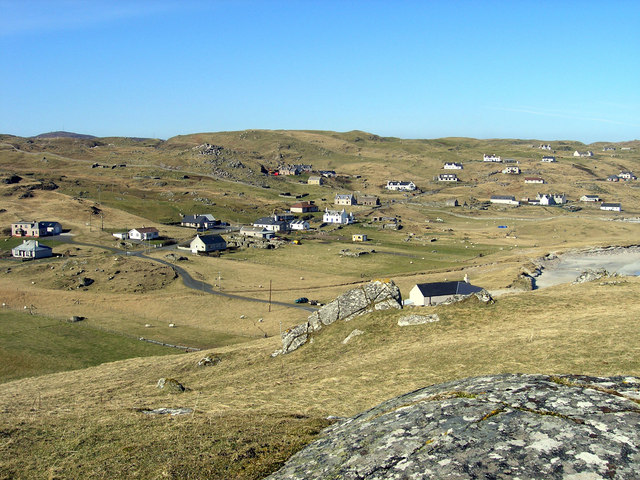
The villages of Kneep and Valtos, in Uig. These lands were once held by the Macaulays of Uig.

=== Massacre of the Macaulays ===
There are traditions on Lewis which tell how the Macaulays were massacred by the Macleods sometime in the 15th and 16th centuries. The Macaulays held farms at Reef, Valtos and Kneep in Uig, which were next to farms held by Tormod Mòr, brother of Ruaidhri chief of Lewis. Tormod Mòr's son, Tormod Oig, was said to have held the farm of Baile na Cille, also in Uig. According to Thomas, the chief of Lewis allowed all the rent collected from Uig go to the upkeep of Tormod Mòr and his family (known on Lewis as Clann Thormoid). When a dispute over cattle arose Tormod Mòr was injured and in revenge his sons led the Macleod clansmen to murder almost every Macaulay they could get their hands on. Tradition has it that the only survivors of the Macaulays were the chief's youngest son Iain Ruadh and his illegitimate half-brother. According to Matheson, this tradition may be a muddled account of the Earl of Huntly's expedition to Lewis in 1506. In that year Huntly invaded the island to suppress the rebellion of the Lord of the Isles claimant Donald Dubh who had been under the protection of Torquil Macleod of Lewis. During the conflict Clann Thormoid and the Morrisons of Ness seem to have sided with the invaders against the Lewismen (which both clans did again when the Mackenzies invaded and conquered Lewis about 100 years later; see Conquest of Lewis section below).

The continuous feuding between the Macaulays and Morrisons are a large part of Lewis tradition. One great clan battle is said to have been fought between the clans near Barvas, and there commemorated by the 18 feet 10 inches (5.74 m) tall standing stone Clach an Trushal. According to tradition, it was erected by the Morrisons to mark their victory over the hereditary foes; however, the 19th-century historian, William C. Mackenzie, dismissed this part of the tradition as being unlikely. The stone is thought to have formed part of a stone circle, possibly like the nearby Callanish Stones. According to a 19th-century Lewis senachie, the 14th-century Lewis chieftain Torquil MacLeod, acted as a conciliator between the Macaulays and Morrisons, following a battle fought between them near Barvas.

=== Prophecy of the Brahan Seer ===
It is on the day Allt nan Torcan
That injury will be done to the women of Lewis:
Between Eidseal and Aird a 'Chaolais
The sword edges will be struck.
They'll come, they'll come, 'tis not long till there
Will come ashore at Portnaguran
Those who will reduce the country to a sorry state.
Alas for the woman with a little child —
Everyone of Clan Macaulay
Will have his head dashed against a stone
And she herself will be slain along with him.

A prophecy attributed to the Brahan Seer, translated by Rev. William Matheson.

Coinneach Odhar, more famously known as the Brahan Seer was a, possibly legendary, Highland seer who is well known for his prophecies across the Highlands. One possible historical Coinneach Odhar is the Keanoch Owir who appears in a Commission of Justice in 1577, as being charged with "diabolical practices of magic, enchantment, murder, homicide and other offences", in Ross-shire. Though according to popular tradition, Coinneach Odhar was born in Baile na Cille, within the Lewis parish of Uig (the heartland of the Lewis Macaulays) and lived during the early 17th century. Tradition stated that Coinneach Odhar was eventually burnt to death by Isabel, the wife of Kenneth Mor Mackenzie, 3rd Earl of Seaforth. One of the many predictions, today attributed to Coinneach Odhar, involves the Macaulays of Lewis (shown right).

Matheson proposed that this prophecy may describe a battle in which the Macaulays were massacred by the Macleods, on the road between Stornoway and Uig (see above). Iain Ruadh (who survived the massacre) was the grandfather of Dòmhnall Cam, placing this instance in the early 16th century. Matheson theorised that it is possibly that the legends of a historical Coinneach Odhar in Ross-shire were brought to Lewis by a Mackenzie who was made tacksman of Baile na Cille, in Uig. Some speculate that through this Mackenzie's mother, who had connections in Ross-shire, that the legend of Coinneach Odhar may have grown in Lewis and incorporated other tales that had been originally been attributed to others.

=== Dòmhnall Cam ===
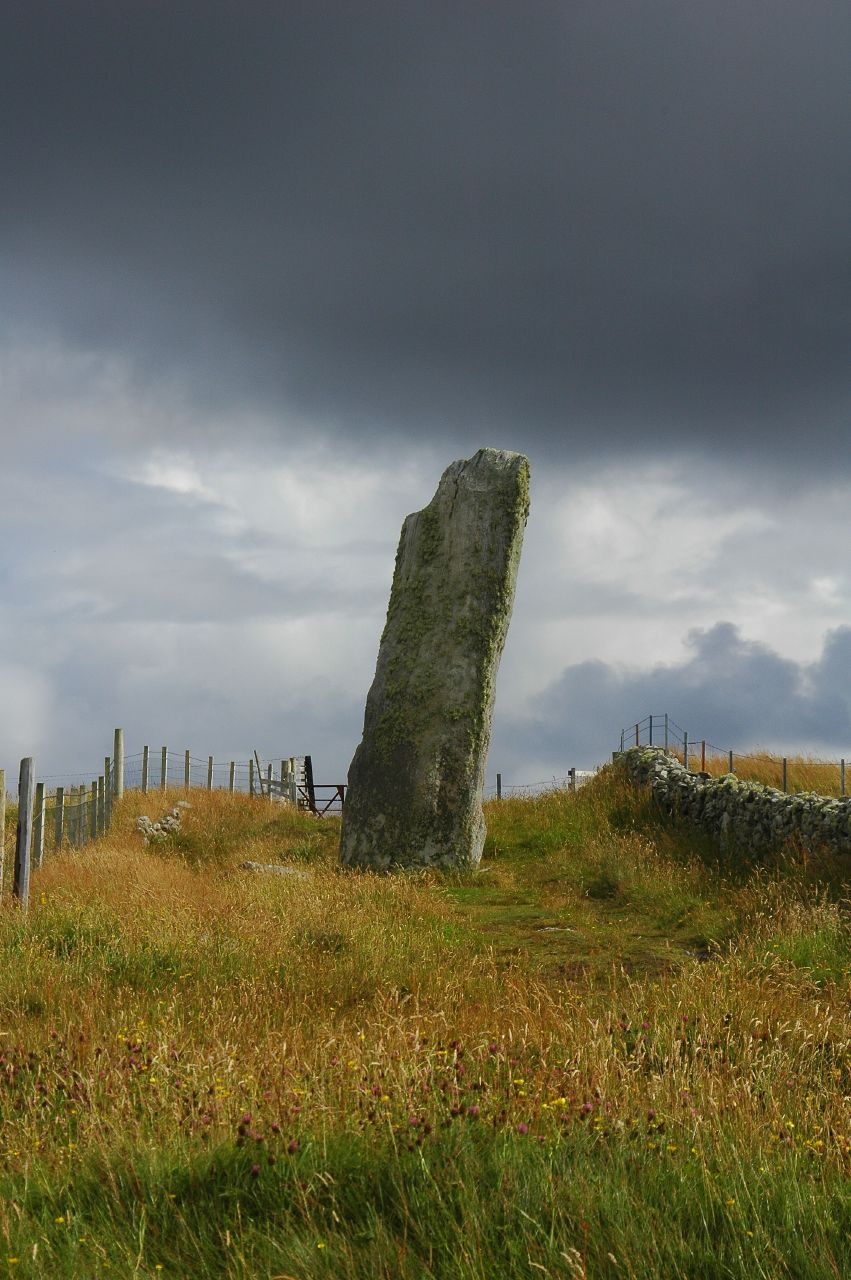
According to tradition, Clach an Trushal was erected by the Morrisons to mark a victorious battle over the Macaulays.

The most notable of the Macaulays was Dòmhnall Cam (also known as Donald Cam) (c. 1560 – c. 1640) who appears frequently in Lewis lore as the subject of many stories told today in Uig. The Gaelic byname cam commonly means "squint" or "blind in one eye"; and according to tradition Dòmhnall Cam lost his eye in a quarrel with Gobha Ban (the smith of Kneep) who put out his eye with a red-hot poker. There are several Lewis places named after him. One such place is a shieling in the parish of Lochs, possibly suggesting a site where his cattle grazed. Another is the stack at Mangersta, where he is said to have hidden from authorities. According to Matheson, tradition current in the 1970s stated that Dòmhnall Cam was the least formidable of his brothers, but what he lacked in physical strength he made up in grim determination. He often appears in stories as being a fierce fighter with a short temper.

Tradition states Dòmhnall Cam fought in Ireland as a mercenary during the Irish wars, and that on an expedition to Derry he made a name for himself. It is said that he was challenged to a duel by "the Great McBane", a champion of an opposing army. Dòmhnall Cam's victory in the duel is said to have been commemorated in a song called Ceann na Drochaid, however no such song by that name now exists. According to Matheson, the song may actually be a pibroch. There are two known pibrochs with similar titles, Ceann na Drochaide Mòire, and Ceann na Drochaide Bige, however both of these relate to the Macdonalds and not the Macaulays. According to F. W. L. Thomas, the tradition of Dòmhnall Cam's exploits in Ireland was based upon the confusion of an Irish battle fought at a place called Beul na Drochaid, in 1495. One of the leaders in the battle was a Sligo chief named Dòmhnall Càm Mac Donnachadha. Even so, Matheson thought that it was possible that Dòmhnall Cam could have taken part in an expedition to Ireland because in 1545 the Macleods of Lewis were one of the Hebridean clans who entered into the service of Shane O'Neill, who was then in rebellion against Elizabeth I of England. This Lewis Macleod adventure was however an inglorious one, and they soon returned home to Scotland. Matheson also conceded that there is no connection between the Lewis Macleod's expedition and Derry where the Lewis tradition ties Dòmhnall Cam to.

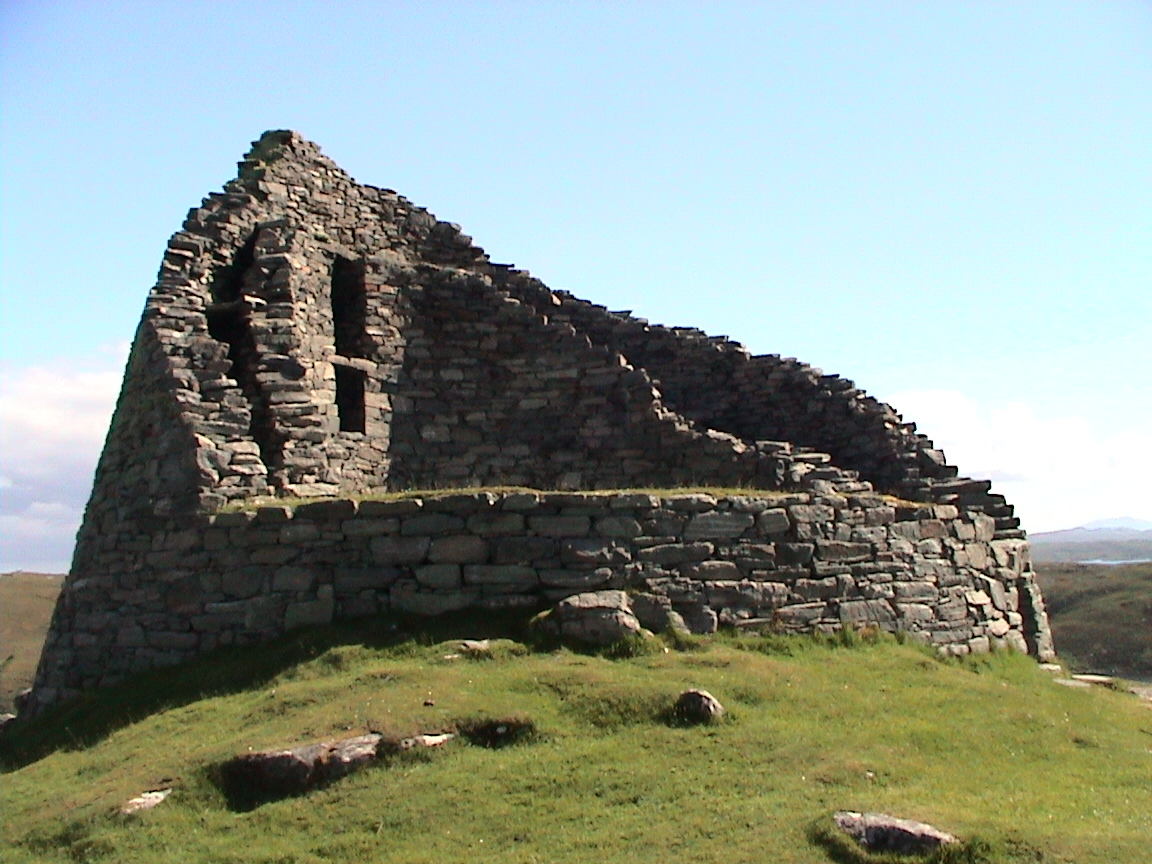
Dun Carloway, a ruinous Iron Age broch.

On his supposed return to Lewis, tradition states Dòmhnall Cam took part in the violent feuds with the Morrisons, and later the Mackenzies. His involvement in the 1605 siege of Stornoway Castle drew the attention of authorities, which resulted in an attempt to expel all Macaulays from their lands in Uig. Dòmhnall Cam is traditionally thought to have been buried in Baile na Cille graveyard. Donald played a significant part in the Macaulays' feuds with the Morrisons. One notable Macaulay and Morrison tradition is of a raid conducted by the Morrisons of Ness into Macaulay territory. When the Morrisons drove off cattle belonging to the Macaulays, Dòmhnall Cam, Big Smith and a force of Macaulays pursued the Morrisons into the night, across Loch Roag and finally to Dun Carloway. After killing the sentry, and with his men blocking any exit, Dòmhnall Cam scaled the walls of the broch, aided by two dirks which he slipped between crevices in the stone wall. Once atop the tower Dòmhnall Cam ordered his men to gather large bundles of heather, which he then threw down inside the broch on top of the Morrisons. Dòmhnall Cam then set the heather alight, which smothered and burned the Morrisons to death and in the process also destroyed Dun Carloway.

=== Conquest of Lewis ===
Up until the beginning of the 17th century the Outer Hebrides, and particularly Lewis, were considered backward and in a state of anarchy by the rest of Scotland. An official account of Lewis described the inhabitants to have "given themselves over to all kynd of barbaritic and inhumanitie" and who were "voyd of ony knawledge of God or His religion". James VI encouraged a Syndicate of Adventurers to undertake the colonisation of Lewis, in the hopes of making the island profitable to Scotland. The syndicate were for the most part lairds from Fife and the colonists themselves lowlanders. The "Fife Adventurers" made three unsuccessful attempts at colonisation lasting from October 1598 to December 1601, August 1605 to October 1606, and for a brief time in 1609. During this period of invasions the islanders rallied and resisted the lowlanders, in time driving out the invaders.

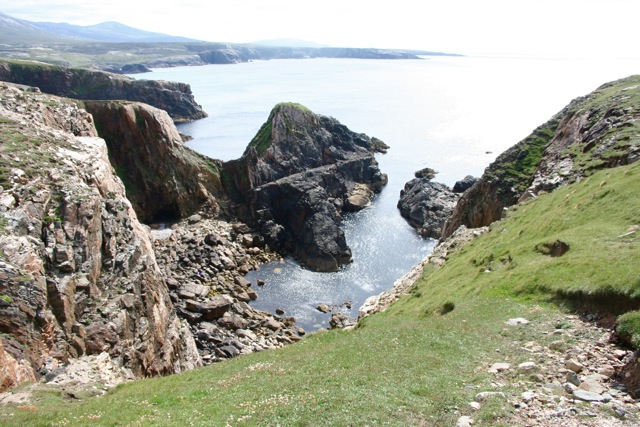
Stac Dhòmhnaill Chaim, near Mangursta, Lewis, in 2008.

In 1607 the Macleods of Harris landed in Lewis and captured Stornoway Castle and other "fortalices" from the Lowlander colonists. In August of that year the Government ordered the fortresses delivered back into the hands of the colonists. Not long afterwards Stornoway was again captured, this time by Lewismen, led by Neil Macleod and Dòmhnall Cam. It was during the fray that Donald's brother was killed on South Beach by a shot from the castle.

In 1610, in light of the collapse of the third colonisation attempt, the syndicate of Adventurers sold their charter rights to Kenneth Mackenzie of Kintail. Within two years the Mackenzies of Kintail had succeeded where the lowlanders could not, and reduced the island to submission. In the years of the Mackenzie conquest the Macaulays fought alongside the Macleods of Lewis against the invaders who had the aid of Clann Thormoid.

Although eventually the Mackenzies gained control of Lewis some islanders still resisted, notably Neil MacLeod and Dòmhnall Cam. Around this time tradition has it that Dòmhnall Cam fortified himself on a 100-foot (30 m) high promontory of jagged rock on the sea-coast near Mangursta (or Mangersta, Scottish Gaelic: Mangarstadh). Today the stack still bears his name: Stac Dhòmhnaill Chaim. Tradition has it that Dòmhnall Cam's daughter, Anna Mhòr ("Big Anne") carried water to her father on her head, as she needed her hands to climb the cliffs.

=== 17th century: Auldearn and the last clan battle between Macaulays and Morrisons ===
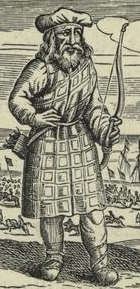
At Auldearn, many of Seaforth's men were armed with bows. This Highland soldier, sketched in 1631, also likely carries a dirk on his left hip.

Following James Graham, 1st Marquess of Montrose's victory at the Battle of Inverlochy in February 1645, George Mackenzie, 2nd Marquess of Seaforth briefly supported the Royalist cause in the Wars of the Three Kingdoms. Seaforth, however, later switched sides and joined the forces of the Covenanters. Following Seaforth were his own clansmen, the Mackenzies, as well as the Macraes, MacLennans and the Macaulays of Lewis. In May 1645, the Covenanter forces vastly outnumbered Montrose and the Royalists at the Battle of Auldearn, yet suffered a crushing defeat and heavy casualties (almost half their entire force). According to Lewis tradition, the eldest son of Donald Cam, Angus (Aonghas Beag; Fear Bhrèinis, "the tacksman of Brenish"), did not, at first, intend to join the Lewis contingent. However, tradition states that his scornful wife shamed him into joining the Lewismen and that he fell in battle with them. Of the 300 Lewismen who set off for battle only 3 returned; of these 300, 60 were from Uig which was the heartland of the Macaulays. The lone Uig survivor was John Macaulay (Iain Ruadh), tacksman of Kneep, and another son of Donald Cam. According to tradition, in his escape from the rout, John wounded a chasing enemy; years later, a blind beggar came to John's house and when asked how he lost his sight, the beggar replied that he lost it at the battle while chasing down a fleeing enemy. Donald Cam's youngest son, William was one of the killed. William was tacksman of Islivig; tradition states that he was ambidextrous, and could fight with a sword in each hand. He was cornered against a wall and fought off his attackers until another climbed into a loft above him and slew him.

According to local lore, on Lewis, the last great clan battle between the Macaulays and Morrisons took place in 1654. Local tradition gives several possible locations for the battle: two at Shader, one at Barvas, and one at Brue. One location, said to have been the battle-site is Druim nan Carnan ("the ridge of the cairns"), near Barvas. The conflict is said to have arisen after a group of Uig Macaulays raided cattle from Ness Morrisons. The Macaulays were only able to escape with their plunder as far as Barvas, where the two sides took to battle. It is not known how many died in the conflict, though tradition states that the fallen were buried in the area, and that their graves were marked by cairns which have now since disappeared. In June 2009, it was reported that one of the traditional sites of the battle, and possibly the graves of the fallen, may be damaged by a proposed plan to erect three wind turbines in the area.

=== 18th century: Jacobite rebellions ===
As tenants of the Earl of Seaforth, the native clans of Lewis followed Clan Mackenzie. For example, an account of Lewis, written in about 1750 states: "the common inhabitants of Lewis are Morisons, McAulays and McKivers, but when they go from home, all who live under Seaforth call themselves Mackenzies". William Mackenzie, 5th Earl of Seaforth decided to support the Jacobites forces in the 1715 Jacobite rising. William C. Mackenzie stated that Seaforth drew up a list of officers to command his troops; upon this list there were 16 Lewismen: four captains, four lieutenants, and four ensigns. Of these a considerable proportion were Macaulays: [Captain] Donald Macaulay; [Lieutenant] J. Macaulay, Bragar; [Lieutenant] John Macaulay, Kirkibost; [Lieutenant] John Macaulay. The failed rebellion cost Seaforth his title and his tenants suffered dearly. In April 1716, the Countess Dowager wrote to Cadogan "the tenants and country are now impoverished that i can expect nothing from them". A year later, Zachary Macaulay, Chamberlain of Lewis (who was a great-grandson of Dòmhnall Cam) wrote that the people of Lewis were in a deplorable condition.

Like the clans Mackenzie and Macleod, the Lewis Macaulays did not support the Jacobites during the conflicts of the 1745–46 rebellion. According to Matheson, Donald Òg son of the tacksman of Brenish, and great-grandson of Dòmhnall Cam, was said to have fought for the Government at the Battle of Culloden. Matheson however thought this unlikely, and stated that the Independent Company raised on Lewis for service to the Crown never joined the others under the command of the Earl of Loudoun. One Lewis tradition in explanation for this was that when the mustered Lewismen sailed across The Minch they were waved back at Poolewe by the Earl of Seaforth. According to the tradition, Seaforth used a sheep's jawbone to wave back the Lewismen, and in the process supposedly fulfilled a prophecy of the Brahan Seer.

Following the Jacobite defeat at the Battle of Culloden, Charles Edward Stuart fled to the Hebrides in the hope to sail to France. During his time in the Hebrides several Lewis Macaulays are noted as supporting the Government cause in attempting to apprehend Stuart. On 27 April 1746, Rev. John Macaulay, a Presbyterian minister, was having dinner with the chief of Clanranald in Benbecula when Stuart secretly landed on the island. When Clanranald heard the news he secretly advised Stuart to make for Stornoway on Lewis, where he could find a ship to take him to France. The Rev. John discovered the identity of Stuart and his plans, and immediately sent warning to his father, Rev. Aulay Macaulay, who was parish minister on Harris and a staunch Hanoverian. Rev. Aulay just narrowly failed to capture the fugitive Stuart on the small island of Scalpay near Harris, before sending warning to another minister on Lewis. When no help was to be found in support of the prince on Lewis, the fugitives made their way back south into the largely Catholic, Clanranald territories of Benbecula and South Uist. An accomplice of Charles Edward Stuart afterwards exclaimed it was "a devil of a minister who did us a' the mischief"—Rev. John Macaulay. (Note: Neil MacDonald, however, gives the 'devil' as John's father, Aulay.)

=== 19th century: evictions, clearances, and emigration ===
Although the Lewis evictions were not on the same scale as those elsewhere in the Highlands, the mass evictions, and deserted villages within the parish of Uig, were a testament to the Highland Clearances. In 1793, Francis Humberston Mackenzie advertised the whole parish as a sheep farm; later in 1796 he issued 133 summonses of removal to its tenants. By the 1820s, the Earl of Seaforth attempted to evict up to 1,000 people from the parishes of Uig and Lochs. Seaforth planned to re-settle the tenants in Stornoway and Barvas, and encourage them to take up work in his proposed fishery. Tenants in Loch Roag, were removed from their homes to newly lotted settlements on the coast; one of these new settlements was later cleared for a sheep farm and its tenants were shipped away to North America. In 1825, the Uig evictions began when Kirkibost and Little Bernera were cleared to make way for Linshader Farm. Between the years 1825–1828, the tenants of Uig were deprived of moorland pasture land, as well as their wintering islands. The houses of the inhabitants of Timsgarry were "rased out" to make room for the glebe of Rev. Alexander Macleod. In 1838, Mealista, the largest township in West Uig, was cleared and the majority of the former inhabitants went to Canada.

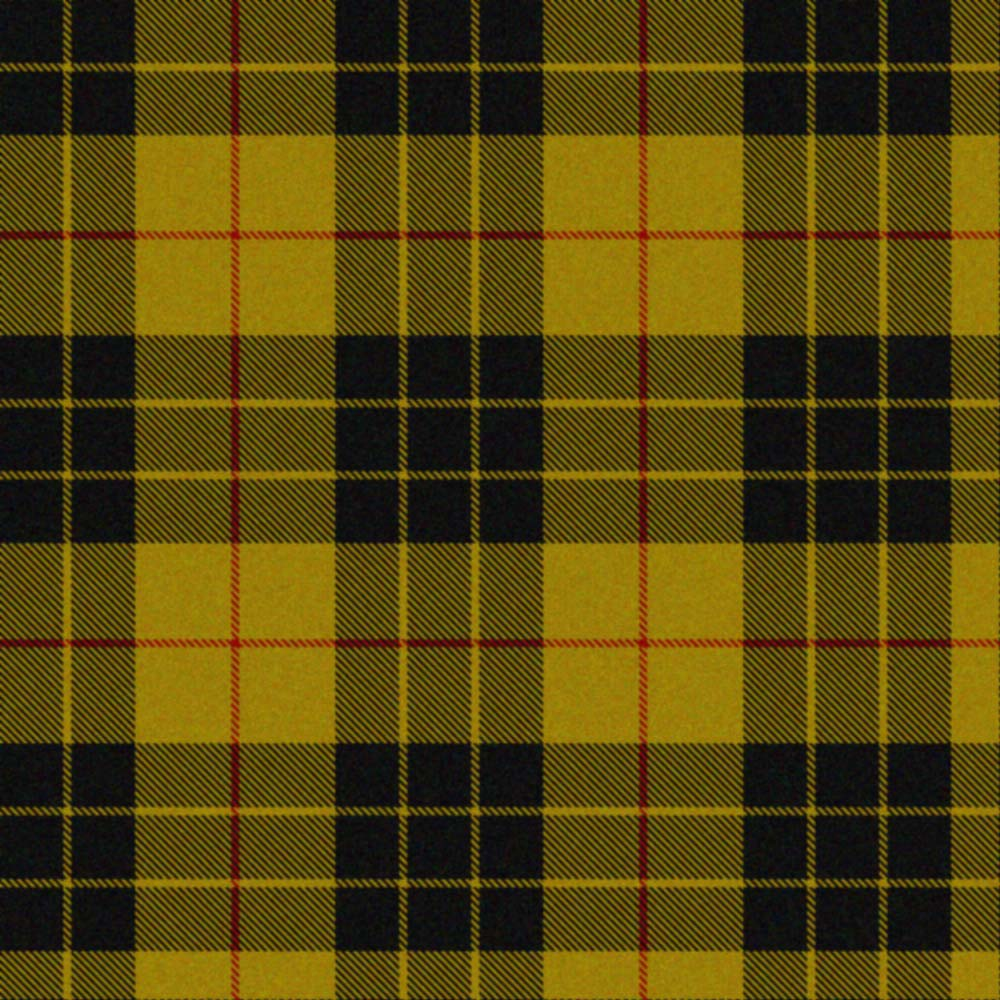
According to Adam and Innes of Learney, writing in the first half of the 20th century, the Macaulays of Lewis then wore the Macleod of Lewis tartan (pictured).

In 1833, the New Statistical Account of Scotland declared that Lewis was "a full century behind other parts of Scotland, in agricultural and domestic improvements, the town and inhabitants of Stornoway excepted, and a few tacksmen". In 1828, provisions were scarce in Uig. The spring of 1835 was wet and cold; the potato crop of 1837 was a complete failure. It was estimated that 1,000 bolls of meal were needed to relieve the distress of the inhabitants of Uig. In 1845, the potato crop failed; the next year was even worse. In 1850, there were 12,892 people living off charity. (Note: The population of Lewis, in 1841, was 17,037 people.) The new owner of Lewis, Sir James Matheson, offered to pay the passage of the destitute to the Canadian provinces of Ontario and Quebec. Many Lewis folk took advantage of the offer and settled in Quebec, around Sherbrooke, in what came to be known as "Scotch County". According to Hebridean genealogist Bill Lawson, emigrants from Uig tended to migrate to the St Francis district in Quebec. Donald Macdonald noted that a Lewis Macaulay was among the three most notorious Lewis tacksmen, who aggressively evicted their tenants—Dr. Donald Macaulay of Linshader, "a land grabber and oppressor with an insatiable appetite".

=== Notable descendants ===
Several notable members of the clan trace their descent from the Uig folk-hero Donald Cam, who is known to have had at least three sons—Angus of Brenish, John of Kneep, and William of Islivig.

- Angus was killed at the Battle of Auldearn, in 1645. He was the first tacksman of Brenish, and had four sons: Zachary, who was killed in the last clan-battle with the Morrisons; Dugald, who was tacksman of Brenish; Murdo, who was tacksman of Valtos; and Donald, who was tacksman of Carnish. Dugald's son was Donald, tacksman of Brenish (fl.1754); and of one of Donald's sons was Rev. John, minister in Barra and later South Uist. Rev. John and one of his sons, Rev. Aulay (b.1720) were noted anti-Jacobite ministers; another of John's sons was the East India Company Army General, Colin Macaulay; and another son was the colonial governor and slavery abolitionist, Zachary Macaulay (1768–1838). One of Zachary's sons was the historian, and Whig politician, Thomas Babington Macaulay, 1st Baron Macaulay, who was sixth in descent from Angus (d.1645). Another son of Rev. John, son of Donald, was Rev. Aulay Macaulay (1758–1819), who was tutor to Queen Charlotte. His eldest son was John Heyrick Macaulay (1799–1840), whose son was Rev. Samuel Herrick Macaulay, whose son was George Campbell Macaulay (1852–1915), a noted Classical scholar. A daughter of George Campbell Macaulay was Dame Rose Macaulay (1881–1958), a noted English writer. One of the sons of Murdo, son of Angus (d.1645), was Zachary, factor to Seaforth in the early 18th century. Another son of Murdo, John Roy, was remembered in Lewis tradition as a noted hunter, who drowned in Loch Langavat. Another son of Murdo was Donald, the last tacksman of Valtos. His son was Murdo; whose son was Kenneth Macaulay; whose son, Robertson Macaulay (1833–1915), emigrated to Canada and became president of the Sun Life; whose son, Thomas Bassett Macaulay, was chairman of Sun Life and a philanthropist who donated funds to institutions on Lewis.
- John, tacksman of Kneep, was the lone Uig survivor, and one of three surviving Lewismen, at the Battle of Auldearn.
- William, tacksman of Islivig was killed at the Battle of Auldearn. He was the youngest of Donald Cam's known sons.
- Captain Murdo Stewart MacDonald, known as last of the Sea-Barons was a direct descendant of Donald Cam.

== Nearby Macaulay clans ==
=== Uist MacAulays ===
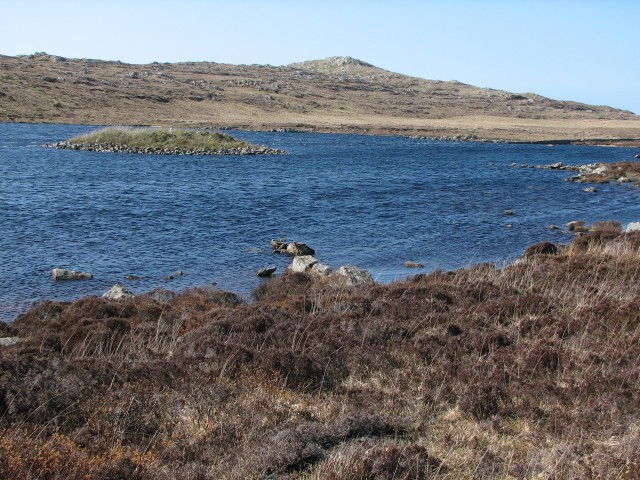
The remains of Dùn Anlaimh, a crannog on Coll, in 2006.

There are MacAulays on the Uists that may descend from the Macaulays of Lewis. There are, however, others that claim no kinship with their namesakes on Lewis. According to tradition, these MacAulays originally came to the Uist from Na h-Eileanan Tarsainn (Matheson translated this as "the Athwart Islands"), which may refer to the isles of Rum, Eigg and Canna (also known as the Small Isles). It has been claimed that these MacAulays may have ultimately originated in the Lennox area, around Loch Lomond; and that their name is derived from the Gaelic Amhalgaigh, rather than a Gaelicised Norse name. If there is truth to the claim, this could make them related to the MacAulays of Ardincaple. Matheson, however, proposed that the Uist MacAulays originated on the Inner Hebridean island of Coll. Within the centre of the island are the remains of a stone fort—Dùn Anlaimh—and loch—Loch Anlaimh—named after Amhlaidh Mór. According to Coll tradition, Amhlaidh Mór was a Norse chieftain who was ultimately defeated by an ancestor of the Macleans of Coll. Matheson considered that it was possible that Amhlaidh Mór was the progenitor of the Uist MacAulays.

=== Wester Ross Macaulays ===
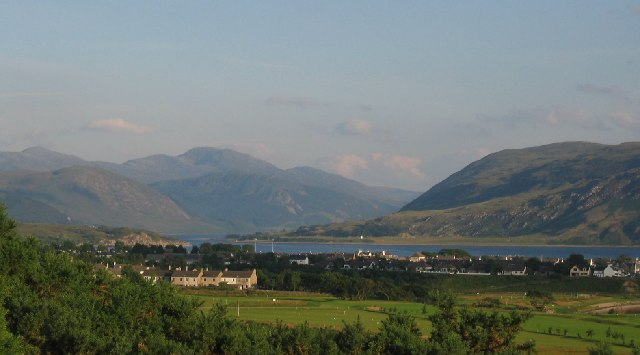
Looking south towards Ullapool, upon the shores of Loch Broom.

According to the traditions of the Mackenzies, there were once Macaulays located in Wester Ross (across The Minch from Lewis). In the 17th century, Dr. George Mackenzie, nephew of Kenneth Mackenzie, 3rd Earl of Seaforth, wrote a manuscript history of the Mackenzies. Within this history, he wrote that the Macaulays, MacIvers, MacBeolans, and Clan Tarlich were the ancient inhabitants of Kintail; and that these families were of Norwegian origin. The history goes on to claim that the Macaulays descended from an Olaus, who was a kinsman to the king of Man; and that Olaus had been granted lands in the area of Loch Broom by "King Alexander". (Note: Thomas quoted the manuscript as stating "King Alexander" granted Olaus lands; and that Olaus lived in the "troublesome times of the Bruce and the Baliol". The king referred to must be either Alexander II (r. 1214–1249), or Alexander III (1249–1286).) G. Mackenzie's history continues that Olaus's son and successor, Duncan, married the daughter of MacIvor in Kintail; and that Duncan's son and successor, Murdoch, married Isabel who was of the Macaulays of Lewis. Rev. Roderick Morrison wrote the description of the parish of Kintail, in The (Old) Statistical Account of Scotland. Within this account, Morrison stated that the Macaulays inhabited Kintail before the Macraes settled in the area; however, he noted that at the time of writing (the late 18th century) there was no trace of these Macaulays.

Thomas considered the etymology of Ullapool (Scottish Gaelic: Ulapul) as confirmation of the Macaulay's presence in the area. Thomas and Herbert Maxwell stated that the place-name of this small town, located on the eastern shore of Loch Broom, was derived from the Old Norse Olafr bólstaðr ("the homestead of Olaf"). The 20th scholar William J. Watson derived the place-name from the Old Norse Ullibólstaðr ("Ulli's stead"). More recently Iain Mac an Tàilleir gave two Old Norse etymologies: possibly meaning "wool farm", or "Ulli's farm". Scholars J. Graham-Campbell and C. E. Batey have also noted that Ullapool, which contains the Norse elements ból or bólstaðir, is one of the few examples of a Norse settlement name on the west coast of Scotland.

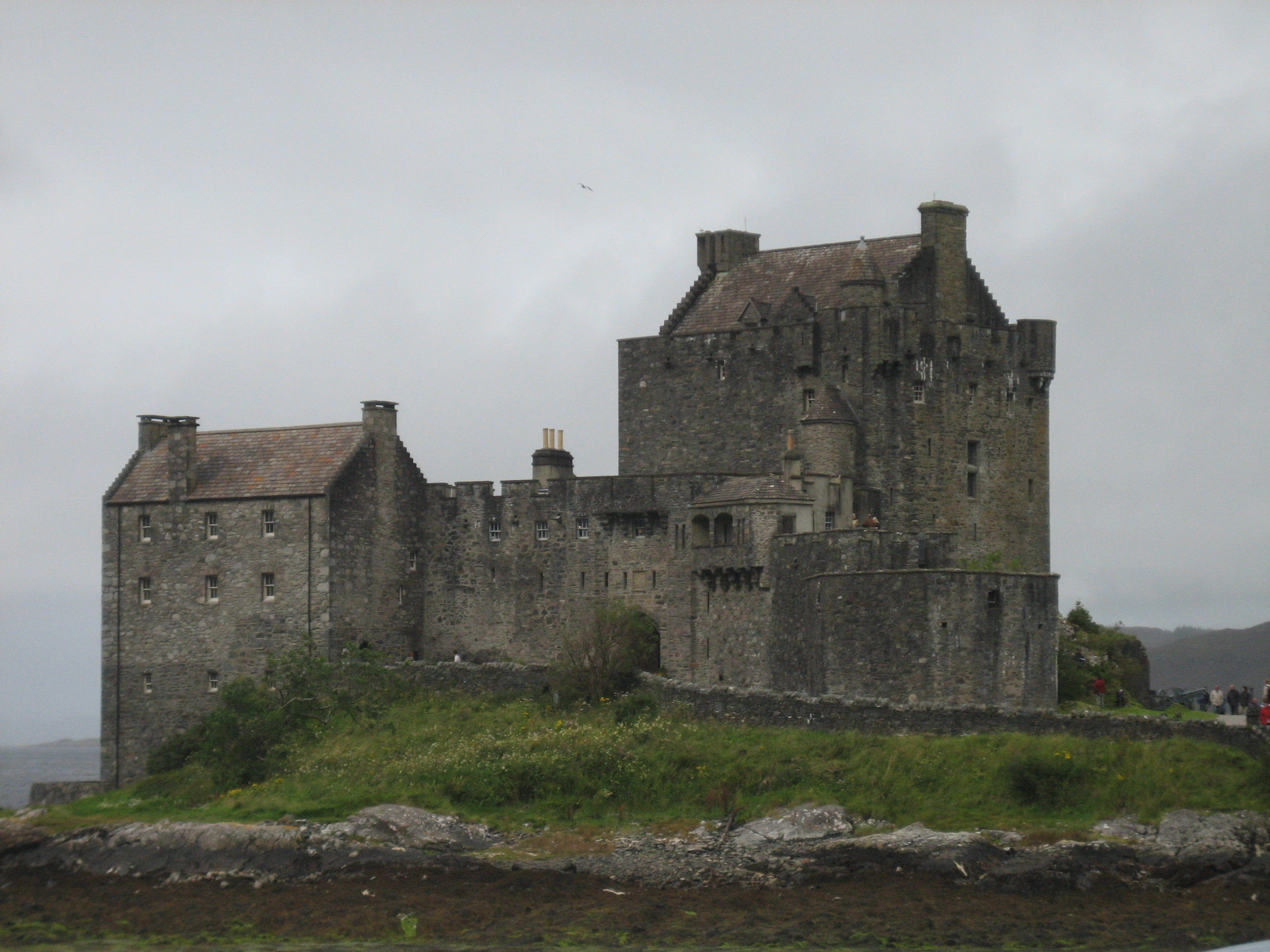
Eilean Donan, said to have been commanded by Duncan Macaulay against the Earl of Ross.

Alexander Mackenzie mentioned the Wester Ross Macaulays in his 19th-century history of Clan Mackenzie. He stated that the predecessors of the Macaulays had been granted the lands of Loch Broom and Coigeach by Alexander II. A. Mackenzie stated that during the 13th century, Uilleam I, Earl of Ross was an instrumental force in regaining control from the Norse; and that he was naturally desirous to gain control of Eilean Donan to aid his cause. During this time, however, the fortress was under the control of Coinneach, the eponymous ancestor of Clan Mackenzie, who refused to hand over the fortress to the king. A. Mackenzie stated that Coinneach was supported by the natives of the district, including the Macaulays of Loch Broom. Much later the third chief of the Mackenzies, Coinneach, was captured by Leod Macgilleandrais, a relative and vassal of the Earl of Ross. The Mackenzie chief was then executed at Inverness in 1346; and the lands of Kinlochewe were handed over to Macgilleandrais as reward. A. Mackenzie stated that the son of the executed Mackenzie chief, Murchadh Dubh, was a close friend of Duncan Macaulay who possessed the lands of Loch Broom, and who also commanded Eilean Donan. According to A. Mackenzie, because Ross was determined to capture the young Mackenzie, Macaulay sent both Mackenzie and his own son to the protection of Mackenzie's relative, Macdougall of Lorne. Ross, however, was successful in capturing Macaulay's son, and had him put to death for Macaulay's part in holding Eilean Donan. A. Mackenzie stated that the actual killer of Macaulay's son was Macgilleandrais; and that Ross granted the lands of Loch Broom and Coigeach as reward for this deed. According to A. Mackenzie, Macgilleandrais's seat at Kinlochewe was situated in a convenient location for his military operations; as it lies exactly between Kintail and Loch Broom. A. Mackenzie continued that Macaulay managed to hold onto Eilean Donan despite several attacks. When Murchadh had grown and returned to his lands, he married Macaulay's daughter, and through her the Macaulays' lands ultimately passed into the hands of the Mackenzies.

Location of the site of the Battle of Bealach nam Brog.

The Macaulays have also been connected to the Battle of Bealach nam Brog (battle of "the pass of the brogue"), fought between various north-western highland clans from the lands of Ross, against the followers of the Earl of Ross. Today the date of the battle is generally given at about 1452. Robert Gordon of Gordonstoun, writing in the early 17th century, stated that the Ross clans consisted of "Clan-juer", "Clantalvigh", and "Clan-leajwe". Thomas translated these as "Clan-iver", "Clan-t-aluigh, i.e., Clan-Aulay", and "Clan-leaive, i.e., Clan-Leay". (Note: In 1910, Gaelic scholar George Henderson, stated of the surname Tolmie, that the "Tolmies of the Hebrides are called Clann Talvaich (see Principal MacIver Campbell's Account of Clan Iver, p. 13)". George Fraser Black later repeated this statement, citing Henderson. However, Campbell made no mention of the Tolmies at all within his history of Clan Iver; instead he specifically stated on the referenced page "Macaulays, called Clan Talvaich".) According to Gordon, a force of Munros and Dingwalls overtook the mentioned clans and fought them at "Bealligh-ne-Broig", between Ferrin-Donald and Loch Broom. Gordon stated that "Clan-Iver", "Clantalvich" and "Clan Laive" were "utterlie extinguished and slain".

The Letterfearn manuscript, written in the late 17th century, contains a bardic story concerning the "battle of the brogues". The story runs that Euphame of Ross wished to marry Mackenzie, despite his refusals. Her followers imprisoned him and tortured his servant, who stated that Eilean Donan would never be surrendered by its constable, Macaulay, except to the one who wore Mackenzie's ring. The ring was then taken from Mackenzie, and used to deceive Macaulay into handing over the castle as a pledge that Mackenzie would not break his alleged engagement to the countess. When Macaulay learned that he was tricked snuck into Dingwall Castle, and communicated with Mackenzie who devised a plan to kidnap the countess' uncle. When the deed was carried out, Macaulay was then pursued by Munros and Dingwalls. When he and his followers were about to be overtaken he sent his prisoner and two men to continue while he stood to defend a pass. The pass, the story says, has since then been known as the 'pass of the brogue', because the pursuers were forced to cover their chests with their brogues to defend themselves against the arrows of the defenders. In time, Macaulay was forced to quit the pass and retreated towards Kintail. Along the way he surprised a party of Rosses who were carrying provisions to Eilean Donan. Macaulay and his followers then arrived at the castle, passing as the Rosses with provisions, and re-took the castle. Macaulay prepared for a long siege and sent word that he would hang his prisoner, the Laird of Balnagowan, unless his master, Mackenzie, was set free—and so Mackenzie was freed.

From then on the history of the Macaulays has been entwined with that of the Mackenzies. Thomas stated that there is no more record of them, and considered that they had amalgamated directly or indirectly with the Mackenzies. On 16 August 1725, George Wade, who was Commander in Chief of His Majesty's forces, castles, forts and barracks in North Britain, by power of the Disarming Act, ordered the disarmament of all highlanders who lived within the lands of the former Earl of Seaforth. William Mackenzie, 5th Earl of Seaforth had forfeited his lands by joining the Jacobite rebellion of 1715. Included among the men living on Seaforth's estates were the Macaulays. The highlanders listed in the summons (see below), were ordered to turn in their "Broad Swords, Targets, Poynards, Whingars, or Durks, Side-pistol, or Pistols, Guns, or any other warlike weapons" at Brahan Castle by 28 August 1725.

To all and every the Clans of the M'Kenzies, M'Ras, Murchiessons, M'Lays, M'Lennans, Mathewsons, M'Aulays, Morrisons, M'Leods, and all other Clans and persons liable by Act of Parliament to be disarmed within the limits of that part of the Estate formerly belonging- to the late Earl of Seaforth, in the parishes of Dingwell, Urquhart, Collyrndden, Rosemarky, Avoch, Suddy, Kilmure Wester, Killurnon, Luggy Wester, Urray, Contan, Totterery, Kintail, Loch Caron, Garloch, Loch Breyn, and Assint, and to all other persons inhabiting or being within the parishes, lands, limits, and boundings above-mentioned ...

— George Wade, Summons sent to the Estate of the former Earl of Seaforth, 16 August 1725

== Population of Hebridean and Wester Ross Macaulays ==
In 1861 Lewis had a population of 21,059 with almost one fifth of the island being a Macleod. Half the population of the island (10,430) consisted of a combination of the surnames Macleod, Macdonald, Mackenzie, Morrison and Macivor. Another quarter of the population (4,598) consisted of the names Maclean, Mackay, Smith, Macaulay, Murray and Campbell; all with at least 400 instances recorded. The most common surname was Macleod (3,838); Morrison (1,402) ranked fourth; and Macaulay (727) ranked as the ninth most common surname. The same year, on Harris (excluding Bernera and St Kilda), there were only 64 people surnamed Macaulay out of a population of 3,764; there were 646 recorded as Macleod and 530 as Morrison. At this time, North Uist then had a population of 3,939; Macaulay was the third most common surname with 165, following the names Macdonald with 1,064, and Maclean with 392. By 1961 Macaulay was the eleventh ranked surname on Lewis, with about 500. The Macleods were ranked first with just over 3,000 and the Macaulays' old rivals, the Morrisons, were ranked third with about 950.

In 1901, the parish of Gairloch, in Wester Ross, had a population of 4,181; 553 of whom were recorded on the Parliamentary roll. The most common 'clan surname' on the roll was Mackenzie with 159; there were 14 with Macleod and 5 with Macaulay.

== See also ==
- Mac Amhlaoibh and Mac Amhalghaidh, several Irish clans named after two Gaelic patronymic names that can both be Anglicised as Macaulay
- Macaulay, list of Wikipedia articles on people, places and things named Macaulay, MacAulay, McAulay
- Olvir Rosta, a character in the Orkneyinga saga, possibly associated with the Lewis Macaulays, or the MacLeods

== Sources ==
=== References ===
- Dictionary of American Family Names. Oxford University Press. ISBN 0-19-508137-4. Cited by Ancestry.com as its source for etymologies listed on the following web page: .
- Transactions of the Gaelic Society of Inverness. Vol. 29. The Gaelic Society of Inverness. 1922.
- Anonymous (2005). The Scottish Clans and Their Tartans (30 ed.). Edinburgh: Kessinger Publishing. ISBN 1-4179-6815-X. Originally pub. by: W. & A. K. Johnston Ltd., Edinburgh and London, 1944
- Adam, Frank; Innes of Learney, Thomas (2004). The Clans, Septs and Regiments of the Scottish Highlands 1934. Kessinger Publishing. ISBN 1-4179-8076-1.
- Beveridge, Erskine (2008). Coll and Tiree. BiblioBazaar. ISBN 978-0-559-52779-1.
- Black, George Fraser (1946). The Surnames of Scotland (2nd ed.). New York Public Library.
- Burt, Edmund (1822). Letters from a gentleman in the North of Scotland to his friend in London. Vol. 2.
- Campbell, John Gregorson (1895). MacIsaac, Duncan; Wallace, Jessie (eds.). Clan Traditions and Popular Tales of the Western Highlands and Islands. London: D. Nutt. ISBN 9780404535353.
- Campbell, John Gregorson (2005). Black, Ronald (ed.). The Gaelic otherworld: John Gregorson Campbell's Superstitions of the Highlands & Islands of Scotland and Witchcraft & Second Sight in the Highlands & Islands (Illustrated ed.). Birlinn. ISBN 978-1-84158-207-8.
- Campbell, Peter Colin (1873). Account of Clan-Iver. Aberdeen.
- Crawford, Alice (1995), Paradise pursued: the novels of Rose Macaulay, Fairleigh Dickinson University Press, ISBN 978-0-8386-3573-5
- Downham, Clare (2007). Viking Kings of Britain and Ireland: The Dynasty of Ívarr to A.D. 1014. Dunedin Academic Press. ISBN 978-1-903765-89-0.
- Graham-Campbell, James; Batey, Colleen E. (1998). Vikings in Scotland: An Archaeological Survey. Edinburgh University Press. ISBN 978-0-585-12257-1.
- Goodare, Julian (2004). The Government of Scotland 1560–1625. Oxford: Oxford University Press. ISBN 0-19-924354-9.
- Hanks, Patrick; Hodges, Flavia (2006). Hardcastle, Kate (ed.). Oxford Dictionary of Names (2nd ed.). Oxford: Oxford University Press. ISBN 978-0-19-861060-1.
- Henderson, George (1910). The Norse influence on Celtic Scotland. Glasgow: J. Maclehose and Sons.
- Lawson, Bill (2004). North Uist in History and Legend (Illustrated ed.). J. Donald. ISBN 978-0-85976-595-4.
- Lawson, Bill (2008). Lewis in History and Legend: The West Coast. Birlinn. ISBN 978-1-84158-368-6.
- Little, John Irvine (1991). Crofters and Habitants: Settler Society, Economy, and Culture in a Quebec Township, 1848–1881 (Illustrated ed.). McGill-Queen's University Press. ISBN 0-7735-0807-4.
- Macaulay, Joseph Babington (1881). Memoirs of the Clan "Aulay": with recent notes of interest extracted from public sources and family papers. Carmarthen: William James Morgan.
- Macbain, Alexander; Watson, William J. (1922). Place names, Highlands & islands of Scotland. Stirling: E. Mackay.
- MacCoinnich, Aonghas (2007). Crossing the Minch: Exploring the Links Between Skye and the Outer Hebrides. The Islands Book Trust. ISBN 978-0-9555420-3-9.
- Macdonald, Donald (1978). Lewis: A History of the Island. Edinburgh: Gordon Wright Publishing.
- Macdonald, Donald (2000). Tales and Traditions of the Lews (Illustrated ed.). Birlinn. ISBN 978-1-84158-055-5.
- Mackay, John, ed. (1894). The Celtic Monthly: A Magazine for Highlanders. Vol. 2. Glasgow: A. Sinclair.
- Mackay, John, ed. (1904). The Celtic Monthly: A Magazine for Highlanders. Vol. 12. Glasgow: A. Sinclair.
- Mackenzie, Alexander (1894). History of the Mackenzies: With Genealogies of the Principal Families of the Name (New, revised, extended ed.). Inverness: A. & W. Mackenzie.
- Mackenzie, William Cook (1903). History of the Outer Hebrides. Paisley: Alexander Gardner.
- Matheson, William (1983). "Notes on North Uist Families". Transactions of the Gaelic Society of Inverness. 52.
- Maxwell, Herbert (1894). Scottish Land-Names: Their Origin and Meaning. Edinburgh: William Blackwood and Sons.
- Moore, Arthur William (1890). The surnames & place-names of the Isle of Man. London: E. Stock.
- Reid, Stuart (2003). Auldearn 1645: The Marquis of Montrose's Scottish campaign. Botley, Oxfordshire: Osprey Publishing. ISBN 1-84176-679-8.
- Richards, Eric (2007). Debating the Highland Clearances (Illustrated ed.). Edinburgh: Edinburgh University Press. ISBN 978-0-7486-2182-8.
- Roberts, John Leonard (2000). Clan, King, and Covenant. Edinburgh: Edinburgh University Press. ISBN 0-7486-1393-5.
- Scottish History Society (1907). Publications of the Scottish History Society. Vol. 52. Edinburgh: Scottish History Society.
- Sutherland, Elizabeth (1985). Ravens and Black Rain, The Story of Highland Second Sight. London: Constable. ISBN 0-09-465240-6.
- Thomas, F.W.L. (1874–76). "Did the Northmen extirpate the Celtic Inhabitants of the Hebrides in the Ninth Century?" (PDF). Proceedings of the Society of Antiquaries of Scotland. 11.
- Thomas, F.W.L. (1876–78). "Traditions of the Morrisons (Clan Mac Ghillemhuire), Hereditary Judges of Lewis" (PDF). Proceedings of the Society of Antiquaries of Scotland. 12.
- Thomas, F.W.L. (1879–80). "Traditions of the Macaulays of Lewis" (PDF). Proceedings of the Society of Antiquaries of Scotland. 14. Archived from the original (PDF) on 11 June 2007.
- Thomas, F.W.L. (1890). "On the Duns of the Outer Hebrides" (PDF). Archaeologia Scotica: Transactions of the Society of Antiquaries of Scotland. 5.
- Thompson, Francis (1968). Harris and Lewis, Outer Hebrides. Newton Abbot: David & Charles.
- Trevelyan, George Otto (1876). The Life and Letter of Lord Macaulay. New York City: Harper & Brothers.
- Venn, J. A. (1951), Alumni cantabrigienses: a biographical list of all known students, graduates and holders of office at the University of Cambridge, from the earliest times to 1900, vol. IV, pt II, Cambridge University Press
- Watson, William John (1904). Place-names of Ross and Cromarty. Inverness: The Northern Counties Printing and Publishing Company.
