= McGauley =

McGauley is a surname. Notable people with the surname include:

- Pat McGauley (born 1961), American soccer player
- Shannon McGauley (born 1963), American activist
- Tim McGauley (born 1995), Canadian ice hockey player

== See also ==
- McAuley (surname)
- McCauley (surname)
