= McCawley =

- Gender: Unisex
- Language: English

Origin
- Languages: Irish (Ir), Scottish Gaelic (SG)
- Origin: 1. Mac Amhalghaidh (Ir), MacAmhalghaidh (SG); 2. Mac Amhlaoibh (Ir), MacAmhlaidh (SG); 3. Ó Cadhla (Ir.)

Other names
- Variant form: MacCawley
- See also: Cawley, O'Cawley

McCawley and MacCawley are surnames in the English language. The names are Anglicisations of several Gaelic-language surnames. There are several etymological origins for the names: all of which originated as patronyms in several Gaelic languages—Irish and Scottish Gaelic. Although the English-language surnames are ultimately derived from Gaelic patronyms, the English-language surnames, and the modern Gaelic-language forms do not refer to the actual name of the bearer's father or grandfather. The surnames are not very common.

== Etymology ==
In some cases, the surnames are derived from the Scottish Gaelic MacAmhalghaidh and Irish Mac Amhalghaidh. Those Gaelic surnames translate into English as "son of Amhalghaidh" or "son of Amhalghadh". The Gaelic surnames originated as patronyms; however, they are no longer used to refer to the actual names of the bearers' fathers. The personal name Amhalghaidh (also spelt Amhalghadh) is an old Gaelic name, and its etymological origin and meaning are uncertain.

In other cases, the surnames are derived from the Scottish Gaelic MacAmhlaidh, or the Irish Mac Amhlaoibh. These surnames translate into English as "son of Amhladh" or "son of Amhlaidh"; and "son of Amhlaoibh". The Gaelic surnames originated as patronyms; however, they are no longer used to refer to the actual names of the bearers' fathers. The names Amhladh, Amhlaidh, and Amhlaoibh are Gaelic derivatives of the Old Norse personal names Áleifr and Óláfr.

According to John O'Hart, a late 19th-century genealogist, the surname MacCawley is an Anglicised form of the Irish Ó Cadhla, which translates into English as "descendant of Cadhla".

== Distribution ==
=== Ireland (including the Republic of Ireland, and Northern Ireland) ===
The surnames are said to be rare in Ireland, and found generally in the Midlands.

According to the General Register Office in Ireland, there were 30 McCauley births recorded in 1890, and there were 49 for the surname McAuley. When the numbers for these names were combined, including certain spelling variations, the data showed that there were 107 total births in Ireland—6 of which were in the province of Leinster, 90 in the province of Ulster, and 11 in the province of Connacht; the counties in which these 107 births were principally found were County Antrim and County Donegal.

=== United States ===
In 1990, the United States Census Bureau undertook a study of the 1990 United States census, and released a sample of data concerning the most common names. According to this sample of 6.3 million people (who had 88,799 unique last names), "MCCAWLEY" (McCawley) ranked 20,101st most common last name, and was borne by 0.000 percent of the population sample. "MACCAWLEY" (MacCawley) did not even rank. Within the 2000 United States census, "MCCAWLEY" was the 21,694th most common last name, with 1,119 occurrences. "MACCAWLEY" did not rank. The table below shows data concerning racial-ethnic aspects of the surname in the 2000 United States census (note that two fields has been suppressed by the United States Census Bureau for confidentiality reasons, since the surname is very rare).

Name	Percent White only	Percent Black only	Percent Asian and Pacific Islander only	Percent American Indian and Alaskan Native only	Percent Two or more races	Percent Hispanic
MCCAWLEY	96.25	suppressed	0.63	suppressed	1.25	1.43

== People with the surnames ==
McCawley

- Charles Grymes McCawley, (1827–1891), American, a senior officer in the United States Marine Corps.
- Deborah McCawley, Canadian, a judge.
- James D. McCawley, (1938–1999), Scottish-born American, a linguist.
- Jim McCawley, (1942–1997), American, a screenwriter and television producer.
- Leon McCawley, (born 1973), British, a classical pianist.
- Rafe McCawley, a character in Defiance
- Rafe McCawley, a character in Pearl Harbor
- Thomas McCawley, (1881–1925) Australian, a judge
