= Mac Amhlaoibh and Mac Amhalghaidh (Irish septs) =

Irish clans by the same Anglicised name

Locations of the three unrelated Irish septs.

Mac Amhlaoibh and Mac Amhalghaidh are two different Gaelic patronymic names with different origins and meanings, but which share the same or similar Anglicisations. These Gaelic names are borne by at least three unrelated native Irish clans or septs (a division or part of a clan).

The Mac Amhalghaidh sept was historically centred at Ballyloughloe in County Westmeath; the Mac Amhlaoibh sept of the MacCarthy family was centred at Newmarket; and the Mac Amhlaoibh sept of the Maguire family was centred in the barony of Clanawley in County Fermanagh.

== Etymology ==
- Mac Amhalghaidh is the patronymic form of the Gaelic personal name Amhalghadh and means "son of Amhalghadh". The personal name Amhalghadh is of an uncertain origin.
- Mac Amhlaoibh is the patronymic form of the Gaelic personal name Amhlaoibh and means "son of Amhlaoibh". The personal name Amhlaoibh is a Gaelicisation of the Old Norse personal names Áleifr and Óláfr.

Today Anglicised forms of Mac Amhlaoibh and Mac Amhalghaidh include: Cauley, Caully, Cauly, Cawley, Cawly, Colley, Gawley, Macaulay, MacAuley, Macauley, MacAuliffe, MacAwley, MacCauley, MacCawley, MacGauley, Magawley, Magawly, McAulay, McAuley, McAuliffe, McAuly, McCaulay, McCauley, McCaully, McCauly, McCawley, McCawly, McGauley, MacAulay, McCowley, McColley, Macauley, McCooley, and Oliffe.

== Mac Amhalghaidh (chiefs of Calraighe) ==
The Mac Amhalghaidh sept occupied lands located in what is today western County Westmeath and northern County Offaly. The heartland of the family was near Ballyloughloe, within the barony of Clonlonan, County Westmeath, and was known in Elizabethan times as "MacGawleys Country". The sept derives its name from the Old Irish personal name Amhalgaidh. According to MacLysaght, the eponymous ancestor of the sept was an Amhalgaidh who lived in the 13th century. The sept is considered to be of native Irish descent. One pedigree of a family within the sept reaches back to Niall of the Nine Hostages and is stored in the genealogical office in Dublin. A genealogy of the sept is recorded in The O'Clery Book of Genealogies which is thought to have been written by Cú Choigcríche Ó Cléirigh in the 17th century. The genealogy is titled "Genelach Meg Amhlaibh Locha Luatha" and runs as follows:

Amlaibh m Amlaibh m Muircertaigh m Aedha finn m Maghnusa m Muircertaigh m domnaill m Floinn m Aedha m Amhlaibh m Fergail m Concoiccriche m Forannain m Suibhne m Domnaill m Ruairc m Cathusaigh m Aedha m Cuinn m Maoil fhothaid m Criomthainn m Brenainn m Briain m Maine m Nell noigiallaigh.

In the 16th century the principal seat of the chiefs was Ballyloughloe Castle. The chiefs of the sept are recorded within the Annals of the Four Masters as the 'chiefs of Calraighe' (which can be Anglicised as "Calry"). The chiefs are mentioned within the mediaeval topographical poems of Seán Mór Ó Dubhagáin and Giolla na Naomh Ó hUidhrín:

The fair Mag Amhalghadha, all
Over the marshes of Calraighe.

In the 19th century, the man considered chief of the name was Count Magawley Cerati. According to the 19th-century historian John O'Donovan, all that remained of Magawley's Castle in 1837 was a single vault.

Arms of Valerio Magawly-Cerati, Count of Calry.

The so-called "Magawley's Chair" is one of two supposed inauguration "chairs" located in the Irish midlands. Both chairs are however considered dubious and are more likely 19th century fanciful creations. "Magawley's Chair" lies in the parish of Ballyloughloe (in the northern half of the barony of Clonlonan). It sits on a hill-slope overlooking the ruins of Carn Castle, which was the seat of Uilliam Mac Amhalghaidh in 1596. The "seat" itself is a rectangular shaped block of rough limestone that has a hollowed out recess on its northern face. The shape of the "seat" is oddly shaped and is considered to have been impractical for an inauguration stone. It has been dismissed as an old fodder trough by some. According to Elizabeth Fitzpatrick, it may have originated as a miniature folly from Carn Park House. The historian Dalton claimed that the inauguration chair of the "Magawley chiefs stood on the hillock now called Tullymagawley". Though according to Fitzpatrick, it is unclear whether Dalton was specifically referring to the chair or the family's seat of general authority. Tullymagawley (Tulach Mic Amhalghaidh) was one of the later mediaeval seats of the chiefs of the sept.

The arms of Arms of Valerio Magawly-Cerati (pictured) are blazoned argent a lion rampant and in chief two dexter hands gules; crest a demi lion rampant gules; motto LAIMH DEARGH ABOO; and supporters the black eagles of Austria. (Note: Burke gives argent a lion rampant gules in the dexter and sinister chief points a dexter hand of the last. The motto is partly Gaelic and can translate into English as "the red hand defying". MacLysaght gave a similar coat of arms for the surname "MacAwley" in his Irish Families. He gives argent a lion rampant gules armed and langued azure in chief two dexter hands couped at the wrist of the second; crest a demi-lion rampant gules. However he did not state who was granted the arms, or date, nor any other information.) Magawly-Cerati was considered by Burke to have been the representer of the chiefs of Mac Amhalghaidh. In 1731, Philip Magawly was conferred the title 'Baron Calry' (Freiherr von und zu Calry) from Charles VI, Holy Roman Emperor. He was also created 'Count of Calry' in the Kingdom of Sicily (Conte di Calry) by the same monarch. He was succeeded by his grand-nephew, whom Valerio Magawly-Cerati descended from.

=== The sept recorded within the Irish Annals ===
Date	Irish	English
M1527.7	Amhlaoibh Ócc Dubh Mag Amhalgaidh taoíseach Calraighe do thuitim lá Cloinn Cholmáin, & ro dhioghail-siomh é fein riana mharbhadh uair do marbhadh Fiacha Mhag Eochagáin lais ar an lathair-sin.	Auliffe Oge Duv Magawley, Chief of Calry, fell by the Clann-Colman; but before his fall, he himself avenged himself, for he slew Fiacha Mageoghegan on the field of contest.

== Mac Amhlaoibh (sept of Mac Cárthaigh) ==
The arms of Dermot MacAuliffe date to the early 18th century.

The Mac Amhlaoibh sept of County Cork are a branch of Mac Cárthaigh (MacCarthy). MacLysaght stated that during the mid 20th century in Ireland, the name MacAuliffe was then usually found within County Cork and hardly ever found outside of Munster. The chiefs of the sept resided at Castle MacAuliffe which was located near Newmarket, County Cork. The territory of the sept was described in 1612 as "Clan Auliffe" (MacLysaght noted that "Clan Auliffe" is commonly used to describe a branch of the O'Farrells of County Longford). The chiefs of the sept are mentioned within the mediaeval topographical poems of Seán Mór Ó Dubhagáin and Giolla-na-Naomh Ó hUuidrain:

Far from the bounteous river Ella,
To the west of Gleann Salchain of smooth rods,
is a fine land without concealment of fair nuts,
It is the land of the noble Mac Amhlaoibh.

A genealogy of the sept is recorded in The O'Clery Book of Genealogies which is thought to have been written by Cu Choigcriche O Cleirigh, one of the Four Masters, in the 17th century. The genealogy is titled "Genelach Meic Amlaibh Alla" and runs as follows:

Eoghan m Conchobhair m Conchobhair m Mail sechlainn m Concobair m Concubhair m Amlaibh m Murchadha m Donnchada m Taidhg m Muiredaigh m Carthaigh.

According to Dalton, the last chief of the name was Michael MacAuliffe, a colonel in the Spanish army, who died in 1720. However O'Donovan stated the last chief was a minor official from Kenmare in 1840.

The coat of arms pictured is that of Dermot MacAuliffe and was first registered in the early 18th century. MacAuliffe was at the time considered the chief of the sept. The arms are blazoned argent three mermaids with combs and mirrors in fess azure between as many mullets of the last; crest a boar's head couped or. (Note: The website www.clanmcauliffe.com states that the arms belonged to Dermot MacAuliffe and were registered by him in 1709. MacLysaght, in his Irish Families, gives the same arms for the surname "MacAuliffe". However, he does not state who possessed the arms, the date they were first registered, or any other information. However, he does not give any other information for the arms.) MacAuliffe was an officer in the Spanish Army. On 1 November 1709, the King of Spain combined several Irish units in his service, one of which, the Ultonia Regiment, was commanded by MacAuliffe. In 1715, MacAuliffe was succeeded by Tadeo (Tadhg) MacAuliffe, who was later mortally wounded in 1718. Tadeo MacAuliffe was then succeeded by Michael MacAuliffee, who was later killed in battle in 1720.

=== Ancestry chart ===
Illustrative diagram of the ancestry of the sept. The names in boldface are MacCarthy kings of Desmond with dates (reign, deposed, death). The chiefly line of the sept is stated to descend from a descendant of the first MacCarthy king.

Carthach (d.1045) (king of Eógonach Caisil)
Muiredach (d.1092) (king of Eógonach Caisil)	Donnchad (d.1093)
**(1) Tadg (d.1124)** (r.1118–23 dep.)	**(2) Cormac** (r.1123–38)	**(3) Donnchad (d.1144)** (r.1138–43 dep.)
**(4) Diarmait** (r.1143–75 dep.) (r.1176–85)
Clann Mhic Amhloaibh

== Mac Amhlaoibh (sept of Mág Uidhir) ==
The Mac Amhlaoibh sept of Mág Uidhir (Maguire) originated in the area occupied within the present County Fermanagh, Northern Ireland. The sept is sometimes referred to as Clann Amlaimh or Clann Amhaoibh. The sept traces its descent from Amlaíb (d.1306), younger son of the first Maguire king of Fermanagh—Donn Óc (c.1286–1302) (also known as 'Donn Carrach Maguire'). Amlaib's family was one of the junior septs that dispossessed non-Maguire families in the area of the Maguire lordship. The family established itself in Muinntear Peodacháin, near Lough Erne, dispossessing the Mac Gille Fhinnéin chieftain. In consequence of their military actions the family eventually left its mark on the area in the name of the barony of Clanawley in County Fermanagh.

=== The sept recorded within the Irish Annals ===
The sons of Amhlaoibh and descendants are recorded within the Annals of Ulster and the Annals of the Four Masters

Date/line	Irish	English
U1319.6	Enri Mac Gilli Fhinnein, taisech Muínnteri Peodachan, do marhadh do clainn Amlaim Meg Uidhir.	Henry Mac Gille-Finnein, chief of Muinter-Peodachain, was killed by the sons of Amlam Mag Uidhir.
M1322.5	Hannraoi Mac Gille Fhinnéin taoiseach Muintire Feodacháin do mharbhadh la cloinn Amhlaoibh Még Uídhir.	Henry Mac Gillafinnen, Chief of Muintir-Feodachain, was slain by the sons of Auliffe Maguire.
M1322.17	Fearghal Ruadh Mac Samhradhain & Giolla Iosa Mac Samhradháin do mharbhadh la cloinn Amlaoibh Mhég Uidhir.	Farrell Roe Magauran and Gilla-Isa Magauran were slain by the sons of Auliffe Maguire.
M1326.10	Amhlaoibh Mhag Uidhir do écc.	Auliffe Maguire died.
M1350.9	Cú Choiccriche Mór Mhág Eochagáin tigherna Cenél Fhiachach, Aodh mac Amhlaoibh Meguidhir, & Muirghes Mac Donnchadha d'écc.	Cucogry More Mageoghegan, Lord of Kinel-Fiachach, Hugh, the son of Auliffe Maguire, and Maurice Mac Donough, died.
M1399.9	Aodh Ua Donnchadha tigearna Eoganachta Locha Len, O Broin, (.i.) Geralt mac Taidhg, & Toirrdhealbhach mac Maol Muire Meic Suibhne Fánatt, & Amhlaoibh mac Pilip mic Amhlaoibh mic Duinn Charraigh Még Uidhir, toisech Muintire Feodachain do écc.	Hugh O'Donoghoe, Lord of Eoghanaght of Lough Leane; O'Byrne (Gerald, son of Teige); Turlough, the son of Mulmurry Mac Sweeny of Fanaid; Auliffe, the son of Philip, son of Auliffe, son of Donn Carragh Maguire, Chief of Muintir-Feodachain in Fermanagh, died.
U1400.9		Amhlaim, son of Philip, son of Amhlaim, son of Donn Mag Uidhir the Rough, namely, chief of Muinter-Peodachain, died on the 2nd of the Nones 6 May.
U1454.4		John Mac Amhlaim the Tawny, namely, son of Brian, son of Amhlam, son of Philip, son of Amhlam, son of Donn Carrach Mag Uidhir and Gilla-Patraig the Swarthy, his other brother, were slain in treachery by Niall, son of Cormac, son of the Black Gillie, son of Aedh-from whom is the Clann-Aedha of the Clann-Amhlaim-son of Philip, son of Amhlam, son of Donn Carrach Mag Uidhir, on the 5th of the Ides 11 May.
U1466.7		Brian, son of Amhlam Mag Uidhir, head of his own ilk and lord of Clann-Amhlaim, died this year.
U1480.11		Philip Mac Amhlaim. Mag Uidhir the Swarthy (to wit, tribe-head of his own ilk was that Philip) died this year.
U1502.1		Inroad was made by O'Raighilligh, namely, by John, son of Cathal Ua Raighilligh, on Philip, son of Toirdelbach Mag Uidhir, and the level part of the country above Clann-Amhlaim was traversed and burned by them and Edmond, son of Philip Mac Amhlaim the Swarthy, and 5 or 6 others were slain by them. And there were slain from that host, to wit, the son of Ua Raighilligh, namely, Domnall of the Plain, and the son of Mac Mael-Martain, namely, Concobur.
U1506.18		Maghnus Mac Amhlaim, namely, son of Brian, son of Amlam Mag Uidhir, died.
M1508.18	Pilip Ócc Mac Amlaibh .i. mac Pilip Riabhaigh mic Briain mic Amhlaoibh mic Pilip mic Amhlaoibh mic Duinn Charraigh Meg Uidhir d'écc. Cenn a aicme fein & fer tighe aoidhedh esidhe.	Philip Oge Magawley, i.e. son of Philip Reagh, son of Brian, son of Auliffe, son of Philip, son of Auliffe, son of Don Carragh Maguire, died. He was the head of his own tribe, and kept a house of hospitality.

== See also ==
- Irish nobility
- Uí Néill
- Eóganachta
- Airgíalla
- Clan MacAulay, unrelated Scottish clan with a name derived from Amhalghadh
- Macaulay of Lewis, unrelated Scottish clan(s) with a name derived from Amhlaoibh
