= Olliffe =

- Pronunciation: /ˈɒlɪf/

Origin
- Meaning: "ancestral relic" or "heirloom", derived from Old Norse "Ōleifr"
- Region of origin: Scandinavia

Other names
- Variant forms: Olliff, Oliffe, Oliff, McAuliffe, McAuley

Olliffe (/ˈɒlɪf/ OL-if ; also spelt Oliff, Olliff and Oliffe) is a rare English surname of Scandinavian origin derived from the Old Norse personal name Ōleifr meaning "ancestral relic" or "heirloom". Olliffe is a version of Ōleifr that has not been gaelicised unlike the Irish and Scottish derivations such as McAuliffe and McAuley. In England, the majority of people with the surname are descended from the Buckinghamshire Olliffes, the earliest traceable ancestors of which lived in the village of Bierton, near Aylesbury, in the mid-16th century.

== People ==
- Arthur Sidney Olliff (1865-1895), Australian taxonomist
- David Olliffe (born 1975), Australian musician
- John Olliff (1908–1951), English tennis player
- Joseph Francis Olliffe (1808-1869), Irish physician
- Pat Olliffe, American comic book artist and penciller
- Steve Oliff (born 1954), American comic book artist
