= McAuley =

McAuley, MacAuley, or Macauley may refer to:

== People ==
- McAuley (surname) (also MacAuley and Macauley), derived from Gaelic patronyms
- Macauley Bonne, English-Zimbabwean footballer

== Places ==
McAuley

- McAuley, Manitoba, a community located in the Rural Municipality of Archie, Manitoba, Canada
- McAuley Park, a small public municipal park located in Vancouver, Canada.

== Schools ==
McAuley

- Catherine McAuley High School, located in Portland, Maine, USA.
- Catherine McAuley High School (Brooklyn), located in USA.
- McAuley Catholic College, located in Grafton, NSW, Australia.
- McAuley Catholic High School (Joplin, Missouri), located in USA.
- McAuley High School (disambiguation), several schools
  - McAuley High School (Cincinnati, Ohio), located in USA.
  - McAuley High School (Toledo, Ohio), located in USA.
  - McAuley High School (New Zealand), located in Otahuhu, New Zealand.
- McAuley School District No. 27, located in Winfield Township, Illinois, USA.
- Mother McAuley Liberal Arts High School, located in Chicago, Illinois, USA.
- The McAuley Catholic High School, located in Doncaster, South Yorkshire, England.

== Other ==
Macauley

- Macauley Island, volcanic island belonging to the Kermadec Islands
- Macauley's Theatre, the premier theatre in Louisville, Kentucky during the late 19th and early 20th century

McAuley

- McAuley Schenker Group, a musical group
- The McAuley Boys, a musical group
- M.S.G. (McAuley Schenker Group album), a music album by the McAuley Schenker Group

== See also ==
- Macaulay (disambiguation)
- McCauley (disambiguation)
- Auley (given name)
- Baron de Mauley
