= McCauley =

McCauley or MacCauley may refer to:

== Surname ==
- McCauley (surname), an English-language surname with multiple etymological origins (also includes surname MacCauley)
- List of people with the surnames MacCauley and McCauley

== Places ==
- McCauley, Edmonton, an inner city neighbourhood located in Edmonton, Alberta, Canada
- McCauley, California, the former name of Foresta, California, USA
- McCauley, West Virginia, an unincorporated community in Hardy County, West Virginia, USA

== Companies ==
- McCauley Propeller Systems, an aircraft propeller manufacturer established in 1938

== See also ==
- Macaulay (disambiguation)
- McAuley (disambiguation)
- Cauley (surname)
