= List of people with surnames Macaulay, MacAulay or McAulay =

List of people with the surnames Macaulay, MacAulay, and McAulay.

== People with the surname ==
=== Macaulay ===
- Alastair Macaulay, chief dance critic of the New York Times
- Angus Macaulay (1759–1827), schoolmaster, physician and political figure in Prince Edward Island, Canada
- Archie Macaulay (1915–1993), Scottish football player and manager
- Aulay Macaulay (disambiguation), several people
- Catharine Macaulay (1731–1791), English historian
- Colin Macaulay (1760–1836), Scottish general, slavery abolitionist and campaigner
- David Macaulay (born 1946), American author and illustrator
- Eunice Macaulay (1923–2013), British-born animator and filmmaker
- Francis Sowerby Macaulay (1862–1937), English mathematician
- Frederick Macaulay (1882–1970), American economist of the Institutionalist School
- Genevieve Macaulay (1880–1938), American philanthropist and Papal duchess
- George Macaulay (1897–1940), English cricketer
- George Campbell Macaulay (1852–1915), English Classical scholar of Herodotus
- Herbert Macaulay (1864–1946), Nigerian politician
- Helene Macaulay (born 1961), American celebrity makeup artist
- James Macaulay (Canadian physician) (1759–1822), doctor and medical official in Upper Canada
- James Buchanan Macaulay (1793–1859), Canadian lawyer
- Jessica Macaulay (born 1992), British and Canadian high diver
- John Macaulay (politician) (1792–1857), political figure in Upper Canada
- John Simcoe Macaulay (1791–1855), another political figure in Upper Canada
- Kenneth Macaulay (politician) (1815–1867), English politician
- Kenneth Macaulay (colonialist) (1792–1829), colonial official in Sierra Leone
- Kyle Macaulay (born 1986), Scottish professional footballer
- Leopold Macaulay (1887–1979), Canadian politician
- Marc Macaulay (born 1957), American actor
- Matthew Macaulay (born 1984), British Christian musician and worship leader
- Michael Macaulay (1939–2021), South African cricketer
- Neill W. Macaulay, Jr. (1935–2007), American writer, professor and Cuban revolutionary
- Reginald Macaulay (1858–1937), English footballer
- Robert Macaulay (1921–2010), Canadian politician
- Robertson Macaulay (1833–1915), Canadian insurance company executive
- Rose Macaulay (1881–1958), English novelist
- Sarah Jane Macaulay (born 1963) aka Sarah Brown, wife of former UK prime minister Gordon Brown
- Thomas Babington Macaulay (1800–1859), 1st Baron Macaulay, "Lord Macaulay", English poet, historian and Whig politician
- Thomas Bassett Macaulay (1860–1942), Canadian actuary and philanthropist
- Tony Macaulay (born 1944), English songwriter
- Tony Macaulay (writer) (born 1963), Northern Irish author, management consultant and peace builder
- Vince Macaulay (born 1961), head coach and owner of British Basketball League franchise Milton Keynes Lions
- Zachary Macaulay (1768–1838), Scottish colonial governor

=== MacAulay ===
- Alexander McAulay (1863–1931), first professor of mathematics and physics at the University of Tasmania
- Fred MacAulay (born 1956), Scottish comedian
- John MacAulay, Canadian lawyer and Red Cross activist
- Lawrence MacAulay, Canadian politician
- Michael Darragh MacAulay, Irish Gaelic Footballer

=== McAulay ===
- Alex McAulay (born 1977), American novelist
- Greg McAulay (born 1960), Canadian World champion curler
- James McAulay (1860–1943), Scottish footballer
- John McAulay (1888–1956), Scottish soldier, recipient of the Victoria Cross
- Terry McAulay, American football official
- William McAulay (1879–1935), Scottish footballer

== See also ==
- List of people with surnames MacCauley or McCauley
