= McAlley =

- Gender: Unisex
- Language: English

Origin
- Languages: 1. MacAmhalghaidh; 2. MacAmhlaibh, MacAmhlaidh

Other names
- See also: Mac Amhlaoibh

MacAlley and McAlley are unisex surnames in the English language. There are several origins for the names.

== Etymology ==
Both surnames can be derived from several Gaelic surnames.

In some cases the surnames are derived from the Scottish Gaelic MacAmhalghaidh. This name translates into English as "son of Amhalghaidh", or "son of Amhalghadh". The surname originated as a patronym, however it no longer refers to the actual name of the bearer's father. The personal name Amhalghaidh (also spelt Amhalghadh) is an old Gaelic name, and is of uncertain origin and meaning.

In other cases, the surnames are derived from the Scottish Gaelic MacAmhlaibh or MacAmhlaidh. These surnames translate into English as "son of Amhlaibh", and "son of Amhladh" or "son of Amhlaidh". The surnames originated as a patronyms, however they no longer refer to the actual name of the bearer's father. The names Amhlaibh, Amhladh, and Amhlaidh are Gaelic derivatives of the Old Norse personal name Óláfr.

== People with the surname ==
MacAlley
McAlley

- Nicola McAlley, Scottish, journalist.
