= Gawley (surname) =

Gawley is a surname in the English language with several origins: one from a Gaelic name, the other from a German name (of Slavic origin).

== Gaelic derivation ==
According to the Dictionary of American Family Names, in some cases the surname Gawley is variant of McGauley, which is in turn a variant of McCauley. McCauley is derived from the patronymic form of two different Gaelic names. One of these names is Amhalghadh, which is of an uncertain origin. In other instances McCauley is derived from the patronymic forms of either Amhlaoibh or Amhlaidh; these names are derived from the Old Norse personal name Áleifr, Óláfr. According to Edward MacLysaght, Gawley is derived from the Irish Mag Amhlaoibh. MacLysaght stated that, in Ireland, the surname is borne by members of a sept of the Maguires in Fermanagh, and also by descendants of the Scottish Clan MacAulay who settled in Ulster.

== German derivation ==
In some cases, the surname Gawley is an Americanization of the German Colle. This surname is a variant of Gohl, which can be of several origins. It may be derived from a nickname meaning "bald" or "naked"; or it can be derived from a topographic name, or a habitational name, meaning "bare heathland" or "place without trees".

== Notable people with the surname ==
- Steve Gawley (born 1952), special effects artist
