= Alexander MacAuley =

Alexander MacAuley may refer to:

- Alexander McAulay (1863–1931), professor of mathematics and physics at the University of Tasmania
- Alexander MacAuley (footballer), Scottish footballer
