= Gawley =

Gawley may refer to:

- Gawley (surname), English-language surname
- Gawley's Gate, small village in County Antrim, Northern Ireland
