= McAullay =

McAullay is a surname. Notable people with the surname include:

- Ken McAullay (born 1949), Australian cricketer and Australian rules footballer
- Simone McAullay (born 1976), Australian actress

== See also ==
- Macaulay (surname)
