= Ó Cadhla =

- Ó Cadhla in a Gaelic type.
- Gender: Masculine
- Language: Irish

Other gender
- Feminine: Ní Chadhla, Bean Uí Chadhla, Uí Chadhla

Origin
- Meaning: "descendant of Cadhla"

Other names
- See also: Ó Caollaidhe

Ó Cadhla is a masculine surname in the Irish language. The name translates into English as "descendant of Cadhla". The surname originated as a patronym, however it no longer refers to the actual name of the bearer's father. The form of the surname for unmarried females is Ní Chadhla. The forms for married females are Bean Uí Chadhla and Uí Chadhla. The Irish Ó Cadhla has numerous Anglicised forms.

== Etymology ==
Ó Cadhla translates into English as "descendant of Cadhla". The surname originated as a patronym, however it no longer refers to the actual name of the bearer's father. The personal name Cadhla means "beautiful", "comely", "graceful".

== Feminine forms ==
Ó Cadhla is a masculine surname. The form of this Irish surname for unmarried females is Ní Chadhla; this name is actually a contracted form of Iníon Uí Chadhla, which translates into English as "daughter of Ó Cadhla". The form of Ó Cadhla for married females is Bean Uí Chadhla, which translates into English as "wife of Ó Cadhla"; this surname can also be represented in the contracted form Uí Chadhla.

== Anglicised forms ==
According to the early 20th century Irish etymologist Patrick Woulfe, Ó Cadhla has been Anglicised variously as Kiely, Keily, Kealy, Kieley,Keely, Keeley, Kelly, and Quealy. According to the Irish late 19th century genealogist John O'Hart, the surnames O'Cawley, MacCawley, and Cawley are also Anglicised forms.

== Families ==
According to Patrick Woulfe, the Irish surname is borne by two noted Irish families. One family were Chiefs of Connemara. The other family were chiefs of Tuath Luimnigh, near the city of Limerick. Woulfe noted that descendants of both families lived in the Irish provinces of Connacht and Munster.

== See also ==
- Kiely, a possible anglicised variant
