= List of people with surnames MacCauley or McCauley =

List of people with the surnames MacCauley and McCauley:

- Alyn McCauley (born 1977), Canadian professional ice hockey player
- Barbara McCauley, American romance novelist
- Clark McCauley (born 1943), psychologist
- Dan McCauley (1936–2020), British businessman
- Dana McCauley (born 1966), chef and corporate food consultant
- Deon McCaulay (born 1987), Belizean footballer
- Don McCauley (born 1949), American football player
- Gary McCauley (1940–2018), Canadian politician
- Jack McCauley (born 1959), American inventor and engineer
- James McCauley (1809–1897), American politician and judge
- Jim McCauley (1863–1930), American baseball player
- John McCauley (1899–1989), Royal Australian Air Force air marshal
- Johnny McCauley (1925–2012), Irish singer and songwriter
- Joseph L. McCauley (born 1943), professor of physics
- Kevin McCauley (born 1979), English professional boxer
- Levi G. McCauley (1837–1920), American politician from Pennsylvania
- Lucy Bowen McCauley (born 1959), American choreographer, dancer and teacher
- Marcus McCauley (born 1983), American football player
- Matthew McCauley (disambiguation), several people
- Maurice J. McCauley (1923–2013), American politician
- Peter McCauley, New Zealand actor
- Rosa McCauley Parks (Rosa Parks), American activist in the civil rights movement best known for her pivotal role in the Montgomery Bus Boycott
- Stephen McCauley (born 1955), American novelist
- Sue McCauley (born 1941), New Zealand writer
- Vincent J. McCauley (1906–1982), American bishop
- Wes McCauley (born 1972), hockey referee
- William J. McCauley (1900–1964), American politician

== See also ==
- List of people with the surnames Macaulay, MacAulay, and McAulay
