= McCamley =

McCamley, MacCamley, MacAmley, McAmley, Macamley
Origin
- Language: Gaelic
- Origin: MacAmhalghaidh (son of Olaf)

Other names
- Variant forms: Macauley, McAuley, Macamley, MacComley, McComley, McAmley, MacAmley

McCamley, MacCamley, MacAmley, Macamley and McAmley are all synonyms of the name MacAuley in the Irish counties of Antrim and Armagh. The most common being McCamley. Notable people with the surname include:

- Bill McCamley (born 1978), American politician
- Graham McCamley (born 1932), Australian cattle baron
- Peter McCamley (born 1978) English Actor and Musician,
