= Aulay Macaulay (disambiguation) =

Aulay Macaulay (died 1788) was the English inventor of a system of shorthand.

Aulay Macaulay may also refer to:

- Sir Aulay MacAulay of Ardincaple (died 1617), Scottish chief of the MacAulays of Ardincaple
- Aulay Macaulay (writer) (1758–1819), Scottish clergyman of the Church of England
- Aulay MacAulay Morrison (1863–1942), Canadian lawyer and politician
