= Queally =

Queally is a surname. Notable people with the surname include:

- Hylda Queally (born 1961), Irish talent agent
- Jason Queally (born 1970), English track cyclist
- Peter Queally (hurler) (born 1970), Irish retired hurler and Gaelic footballer
- Tom Queally (born 1984), Irish thoroughbred horse racing jockey

== See also ==
- Quealy
