= McAuliffe (surname) =

McAuliffe or MacAuliffe is a surname of Norse Irish origin. The name is an Anglicisation of the Gaelic Mac Amhlaoibh, meaning "son of Amhlaoibh". The Gaelic name, Amhlaoibh, was derived from the Old Norse personal name Olaf. The surname occurs frequently in Munster, especially northern County Cork, western County Limerick, and eastern County Kerry. The McAuliffes were a sept, related to the McCarthys.

== People surnamed McAuliffe ==
- General Anthony Clement "Nuts" McAuliffe (1898–1975), US general in the Battle of the Bulge
- Callan McAuliffe, (born 1995), Australian actor
- Christa McAuliffe (1948–1986), American teacher and astronaut (STS-51-L; perished during the Space Shuttle Challenger disaster)
- Dick McAuliffe (1939–2016), professional baseball player
- Dorothy McAuliffe, American, First Lady of the Commonwealth of Virginia
- Gene McAuliffe (1872–1953), American professional baseball player
- Jack McAuliffe (American football) (1901–1971), American football player
- Jack McAuliffe (boxer) (1886–1937), Irish-born American boxer
- Jack McAuliffe (brewer) (1945–2025), American microbrewer
- Jane Dammen McAuliffe, American, president of Bryn Mawr College
- Leon McAuliffe (1917–1988), American guitarist and singer-songwriter
- Maurice F. McAuliffe (1875–1944), American Roman Catholic bishop
- Max Arthur Macauliffe, scholar of Sikh scripture
- Megan McAuliffe, New Zealand speech pathologist
- Nichola McAuliffe (born 1955), British actress
- Paul McAuliffe, 350th Lord Mayor of Dublin
- Roger McAuliffe, American politician
- Ron McAuliffe (1918–1988), Australian politician
- Rosemary McAuliffe, American politician
- Steven J. McAuliffe (born 1948), American judge
- Terry McAuliffe (born 1957), American businessman, political operative, and Governor of the Commonwealth of Virginia
- Tim McAuliffe, Canadian television comedy writer
- Timothy McAuliffe (1909–1985), Irish politician

== See also ==
- Michael McAuliffe (disambiguation)
- McCarthy (surname)
- Mac Amhlaoibh and Mac Amhalghaidh (Irish septs)
- Eóganachta
