= O'Cawley =

- Gender: Unisex
- Language: English

Origin
- Language: Irish
- Origin: Ó Cadhla
- Meaning: "descendant of Cadhla"

Other names
- See also: Cawley, MacCawley, McCawley, Crowley

O'Cawley is a surname in the English language. According to John O'Hart, a 19th-century Irish genealogist, the surname is an Anglicised form of the Irish Ó Cadhla. The Irish Ó Cadhla originated as a patronym, meaning "descendant of Cadhla". The masculine personal name Cadhla means "beautiful", "comely", "graceful". In the United States of America the surname is extremely uncommon, and did not rank in the 2000 United States census.
