= Mac Amhlaoibh =

- Mac Amhlaoibh in a Gaelic type. The lenited m and b in the name (mh and bh) once appeared in Irish orthography with diacritics above them, as pictured.
- Gender: Masculine
- Language: Irish

Other gender
- Feminine: Nic Amhlaoibh, Bean Mhic Amhlaoibh, Mhic Amhlaoibh

Origin
- Language: Irish
- Meaning: "son of Amhlaoibh"

Other names
- See also: Mac Amhalghadha, Mac Amhalghaidh, Mag Amhalghadha

Mac Amhlaoibh is a masculine surname in the Irish language. The name translates into English as "son of Amhlaoibh". The surname originated as a patronym, however it no longer refers to the actual name of the bearer's father. The form of the surname for unmarried females is Nic Amhlaoibh. The forms for married females are Bean Mhic Amhlaoibh and Mhic Amhlaoibh. The Irish Mac Amhlaoibh has numerous Anglicised forms. The surname has been borne by several notable Irish families that are unrelated to each other.

== Etymology ==
Mac Amhlaoibh translates into English as "son of Amhlaoibh". The surname originated as a patronym, however it no longer refers to the actual name of the bearer's father. The name Amhlaoibh is a Gaelic derivative of the Old Norse personal name Óláfr.

== Feminine forms ==
Mac Amhlaoibh is a masculine surname. The form of this surname for unmarried females is Nic Amhlaoibh; this name translates into English as "daughter of the son of Amhlaoibh. The form of this surname for married females is Bean Mhic Amhlaoibh, or simply Mhic Amhlaoibh; these surnames translate to "wife of the son of Amhlaoibh.

== Anglicised forms ==
There are numerous Anglicised forms of the surname. Anglicisations in use today include MacAuliffe, MacAuley, MacCauliffe, MacCauley, MacCawley, MacCowley, Kewley (on the Isle of Man), Cauley, Cawley, and Cowley. Many of these English-language surnames also have unrelated origins. For example, in many cases the Irish Mac Amhalghadha and Mac Amhalghaidh have been Anglicised into identical forms.

== Families ==
The surname has been borne by several notable and unrelated Irish families. One such family was centred in County Cork, and seated at Castle MacAuliffe near Newmarket. This family was a branch of the MacCarthy family. Another family, centred in County Fermanagh in the barony of Clanawley, was a branch of the Maguires of Fermanagh.

== People with the name ==
Surname

- Muireann Nic Amhlaoibh, (born 1978), Irish, musician and singer
