= Quealy =

- Language: English

Origin
- Language: Irish
- Origin: Ó Cadhla
- Meaning: "descendant of Cadhla"

Quealy or Quealey is a surname in the English language. It is derived from one of several names in Irish: Ó Cadhla and Ua Caollaidhe of Uí Bercháin (Ibercon) in Osraige.

== Notable people with the surname ==
- Chelsea Quealey (1905–1950), American jazz trumpeter
- Gerit Quealy (born 1960), American writer, editor, Shakespearean scholar and actor
- Jim Quealey (1917–?), Australian professional rugby league footballer
- Michael Quealy (fl. 1980s), former Fine Gael politician in Ireland
- Patrick Quealy (1857–1930), founder of Kemmerer, Wyoming
- Peadar Quealy (born 1956), Irish former hurler
- William H. Quealy (1913–1993), judge of the United States Tax Court

== See also ==
- Queally
