= Kiely =

Kiely is an Irish surname. It is either the Anglicized form of Ó Cadhla or a variant of Keeley. Notable people with the surname are:

- Benedict Kiely (1919–2007), Irish writer and broadcaster
- Dan Kiely (born 1940), Irish auctioneer and politician
- David M. Kiely (born 1949), Irish writer
- Dean Kiely (born 1970), English former footballer
- Jerome Kiely (1925–2019), Irish poet
- John Kiely (disambiguation), several people
- Kevin Kiely, Irish politician
- Kevin Kiely (poet) (born 1953), Northern Irish poet
- Larry Kiely (born 1941), Irish hurler
- Laurence Kiely (1880–1961), Irish Olympic hurdler
- Len Kiely (Leonard Francis Kiely; born 1954), Australian politician
- Leo Kiely (1929–1984), American baseball pitcher
- Mark Kiely, American actor
- Molly Kiely (born 1969), American cartoonist
- Rory Kiely (1934–2018), Irish politician
- Orla Kiely (born 1963), Irish fashion designer
- Perri Kiely (born 1995), British street dancer
- Sophia Kiely (born 2000), British stage actress
- Terry Kiely (born 1975), British actor
- Tom Kiely (Thomas Francis Kiely; 1869–1951), Irish Olympic athlete
- Paige Ackerson-Kiely (born 1975), American poet
