= Cawley =

- Gender: Unisex
- Language: English

Origin
- Languages: 1. English; 2. Irish, Scottish Gaelic

Other names
- See also: MacCawley, McCawley, O'Cawley

Cawley is a surname in the English language. There are several different origins of the surname. In some cases the surnames are derived from any of numerous place names in England. In other cases the surnames are derived from any of several Gaelic language surnames.

== Etymology ==
In some cases the surname is a variant of the surname Cowley, and is thus derived from any of a number of different place names in England. Such places are located in Buckinghamshire, Devon, Oxfordshire, Staffordshire, Derbyshire, Lancashire, Gloucestershire, and Middlesex. These place names have numerous different etymologies. For example, one place name is derived from the Old English elements cu and leah, meaning "cow" and "woodland clearing"; another two are from the Old English col, meaning "coal" (in reference to charcoal); other places may be in part derived from the Old English personal names Cufa and Cofa.

In some cases, the surnames are derived from the Scottish Gaelic MacAmhalghaidh, and Irish Mac Amhalghaidh. These Gaelic surnames translates into English as "son of Amhalghaidh" or "son of Amhalghadh". The Gaelic surnames originated as a patronyms, however they are no longer used to refer to the actual names of the bearers' fathers. The personal name Amhalghaidh (also spelt Amhalghadh) is an old Gaelic name, and its etymological origin and meaning are uncertain.

In other cases, the surnames are derived from the Scottish Gaelic MacAmhlaidh, or the Irish Mac Amhlaoibh. These surnames translate into English as "son of Amhladh" or "son of Amhlaidh"; and "son of Amhlaoibh". The Gaelic surnames originated as a patronyms, however they are no longer used to refer to the actual names of the bearers' fathers. The names Amhladh, Amhlaidh, and Amhlaoibh are Gaelic derivatives of the Old Norse personal names Áleifr and Óláfr.

== Distribution ==
=== United States ===
In 1990, the United States Census Bureau undertook a study of the 1990 United States census, and released a sample of data concerning the most common names. According to this sample of 6.3 million people (who had 88,799 unique last names), Cawley ranked 7,289th most common last name, and was borne by 0.002 percent of the population sample. Within the 2000 United States census, Cawley was the 5,900th most common last name, with 5,370 occurrences. The table below shows data concerning racial-ethnic aspects of the surname in the 2000 United States census.

Name	Percent White only	Percent Black only	Percent Asian and Pacific Islander only	Percent American Indian and Alaskan Native only	Percent Two or more races	Percent Hispanic
Cawley	93.17	3.26	0.67	0.24	1.3	1.36

== List of persons with the surname ==
- Ainan Celeste Cawley (born 1999), Malaysian prodigy
- Alan Cawley (born 1982), Irish professional football player
- Brendan Cawley, Irish sportsman
- Charles Cawley (contemporary), founding member of the bank MBN
- Frederick Cawley, 1st Baron Cawley – British politician and businessman (1850-1937)
- Gerry Cawley (contemporary), Cornish wrestling champion
- Harold Thomas Cawley (1878–1915), British politician and soldier, son of 1st Baron Cawley; killed in World War I
- James Cawley (born 1967), American actor
- Jim Cawley, lieutenant governor of Pennsylvania
- John Cawley, see John Calley (died 1725), British co-inventor of the Newcomen steam engine.
- Katie Schumacher-Cawley (born 1980), American volleyball/basketball player and coach
- Oswald Cawley (1882–1918), British politician and soldier, son of 1st Baron Cawley; killed in World War I
- Peter Cawley (born 1965), English professional football player
- Rex Cawley (1940–2022), American Olympic hurdler
- Richard Cawley (contemporary), English couturier
- Samuel Arthur Cawley (1858-1947_. Canadian politician
- Shirley Cawley (born 1932), British Olympic long jumper
- Tucker Cawley (contemporary), American television comedy writer and producer
- William Cawley (1602–1667), British politician; MP for Midhurst 1640
- Will Cawley, an English boxer
