= McCauley (surname) =

- Gender: Unisex
- Language: English

Origin
- Languages: Irish (Ir), Scottish Gaelic (SG)
- Origin: 1. MacAmhalghaidh (SG), Mac Amhalghaidh (Ir); 2. MacAmhlaidh (SG), Mac Amhlaoibh (Ir)

Other names
- Variant form: MacCauley
- See also: Cauley, O'Cauley

McCauley and MacCauley are surnames in the English language. There are several etymologically unrelated origins for the names: all of which originated as patronyms in several Gaelic languages—Irish and Scottish Gaelic. Although the English-language surnames are ultimately derived from Gaelic patronyms, the English-language surnames, and the modern Gaelic-language forms do not refer to the actual name of the bearer's father. The Irish McCauley's originated in County Westmeath (Irish: An Iarmhí) in the Irish Midlands, province of Leinster, where at one time the area which is now Ballyloughloe was once called "McGawley's Country, the Scottish McCauleys are partly descended from the Irish McCauleys as the Irish moved to Scotland offered land by Robert the Bruce". In Ireland, it can be also a variation of Mulcahy. The English-language surnames are generally popular in certain parts of Ireland—both in the Republic of Ireland and Northern Ireland. According to census records in the United States of America, "MCCAULEY" (McCauley) is a somewhat common surname, although "MACCAULEY" (MacCauley) is extremely rare.

== Etymology ==
In some cases, the surnames are derived from the Scottish Gaelic MacAmhalghaidh, and Irish Mac Amhalghaidh. These Gaelic surnames translates into English as "son of Amhalghaidh" or "son of Amhalghadh". The Gaelic surnames originated as a patronyms, however they are no longer used to refer to the actual names of the bearers' fathers. The personal name Amhalghaidh (also spelt Amhalghadh) is an old Gaelic name, and its etymological origin and meaning are uncertain.

In other cases, the surnames are derived from the Scottish Gaelic MacAmhlaidh, or the Irish Mac Amhlaoibh. These surnames translate into English as "son of Amhladh" or "son of Amhlaidh"; and "son of Amhlaoibh". The Gaelic surnames originated as a patronyms, however they are no longer used to refer to the actual names of the bearers' fathers. The names Amhladh, Amhlaidh, and Amhlaoibh are Gaelic derivatives of the Old Norse personal names Áleifr and Óláfr.

== Distribution, popularity ==
=== Ireland (including the Republic of Ireland, and Northern Ireland) ===
In Ireland, the surnames are generally popular in County Londonderry, in Northern Ireland, and the province of Ulster. It is also found in numbers in County Leitrim, County Galway, and County Wexford—all in the Republic of Ireland. According to the General Register Office in Ireland, there were 30 McCauley births recorded in 1890, and there were 49 for the surname McAuley. When the numbers for these names were combined, including certain spelling variations, the data showed that there were 107 total births in Ireland—6 of which were in the province of Leinster, 90 in the province of Ulster, and 11 in the province of Connacht; the counties in which these 107 births were principally found were County Antrim and County Donegal. The similarly spelt surname McAuliffe had 39 births, and 40 in total, when combining certain spelling variations; all of these 40 were recorded in the province of Munster, and 29 of these in County Cork.

=== United States ===
In 1990, the United States Census Bureau undertook a study of the 1990 United States census, and released a sample of data concerning the most common names. According to this sample of 6.3 million people (who had 88,799 unique last names), "MCCAULEY" ranked 1,431st most common last name, and was borne by 0.009 percent of the population sample. "MACCAULEY" was much less common; it ranked 70,537th most common last name, and was borne by 0.000 percent of the population sample. Within the 2000 United States census, "MCCAULEY" was the 1,360th most common last name, with 23,926 occurrences. "MACCAULEY" did not rank amongst the top 151,671 last names. The table below shows the data concerning racial-ethnic aspects of the surnames in the 2000 United States census.

Name	Percent White only	Percent Black only	Percent Asian and Pacific Islander only	Percent American Indian and Alaskan Native only	Percent Two or more races	Percent Hispanic
MCCAULEY	85.57	10.29	0.43	0.94	1.34	1.42

=== Scotland ===
McCauley and MacCauley were amongst the 100 most common surnames recorded in birth, death, and marriage registers in Scotland, in 1995. Neither surname ranked amongst the 100 most common surnames recorded in birth, death, and marriage registrations in the combined years of 1999, 2000, and 2001. Neither surname ranked amongst the most common surnames recorded in Scotland, in the United Kingdom Census 1901.

== People with the surnames ==
- List of people with the surnames MacCauley and McCauley
