= Matthew McCauley =

Matthew McCauley may refer to:

- Matthew McCauley (politician) (1850–1930), Canadian politician
- Matthew McCauley (producer) (born 1954), Canadian-born American composer and record producer
