= Michael McAuliffe =

Michael McAuliffe may refer to:

- Michael A. McAuliffe, U.S. Air Force general
- Michael P. McAuliffe (born 1963), member of the Illinois House of Representatives
- Michael Francis McAuliffe (1920–2006), American prelate of the Roman Catholic Church
- Michael McAuliffe (drug trafficker) (died 1993), Australian executed in Malaysia for drug trafficking
- Michael McAuliffe, voice actor for Slippy Toad in Star Fox: Assault

== See also ==
- Max Arthur Macauliffe, Irish scholar of Sikhism whose birth name was Michael McAuliffe
