= Pat McGauley =

American soccer player

Personal information
- Date of birth: April 23, 1961 (age 65)
- Place of birth: St. Louis, Missouri, U.S.
- Positions: Forward; defender

Youth career
- 1979–1983: Indiana Hoosiers

Senior career*
Years	Team	Apps	(Gls)
1984	Chicago Sting	19	(0)
1984–1987	Chicago Sting (indoor)	130	(41)
1988	Chicago Schwaben		
- * Club domestic league appearances and goals

Pat McGauley is an American retired soccer player who played in the North American Soccer League and the Major Indoor Soccer League. He scored the winning goal in the 1983 NCAA Men's Division I Soccer Championship and the 1977 McGuire Cup. He currently works for Anheuser-Busch as the Vice President of Innovation.

== Youth ==
McGauley graduated from St. Mary's High School in St. Louis, Missouri. McGauley attended Indiana University, playing on the men's soccer team which won the 1982 and 1983 NCAA Men's Division I Soccer Championship. In the 1983 championship, he scored the game-winning goal in Hoosier's 1–0 victory over the Columbia Lions.

== Professional ==
In October 1983, the St. Louis Steamers drafted McGauley in the second round of the Major Indoor Soccer League draft. He signed with the Chicago Sting of the North American Soccer League and played in the 1984 Soccer Bowl Championship season. In the fall of 1984, the Sting entered the MISL and McGauley then played three indoor seasons in Chicago. In October 1987 McGauley retired from professional soccer. He briefly played for the Sting's reserve team, then moved to Chicago Schwaben in the Chicago Metro League.
