= Matthew Macaulay =

- Born: 29 February 1984 (age 41); Manchester, North West England
- Origin: Chorleywood, East of England
- Genres: Worship, CCM
- Occupation(s): Singer, songwriter, worship leader
- Instrument(s): Vocals, singer-songwriter
- Years active: 2008–present
- Labels: Authentic, Mustard
- Website: matthewmacaulay.com

Matthew Macaulay (born 29 February 1984) is a British Christian musician and worship leader, who primarily plays a contemporary Christian style of worship music. He has released two studio albums, As for Me in 2008 and Life Light in 2012.

== Early life ==
Matthew Macaulay was born on 29 February 1984 in Manchester, North West England, where he lived until he was eighteen months to two years old, when his family relocated to Chorleywood, East of England. He was raised in a musical household, where his mother was educated in music at Royal College, while she studied how to play the piano and violin. His father is a guitar player, who is a worship leader, where his own father was a bagpiper. His music ministering education was done during a two-year stint with Hillsong Church in Sydney, Australia, before he settled back in Watford, Hertfordshire, at Soul Survivor. His worship leading is now done at St. Andrew Church.

== Music career ==
Macaulay's music recording career began in 2008, with the studio album, As for Me, that was released on 30 September 2008, by Authentic Records. His subsequent studio album, Life Light, was released from Mustard Productions, on 15 August 2012.

== Discography ==
Studio albums

- As for Me (30 September 2008, Authentic)
- Life Light (15 August 2012, Mustard)
