= Cauley =

- Gender: Unisex
- Language: English

Origin
- Language: Irish
- Origin: Amhalghaidh

Other names
- See also: MacCauley, McCauley

Cauley is a surname in the English language. It is an Anglicised form of the Irish Amhalghaidh which was itself a Gaelicised form of the Old Norse name Óláfr.

== People with the surname ==
- Ben Cauley, (1947–2015) American trumpet player, vocalist, and founding member of the Stax recording group.
- Bud Cauley
- Cam Cauley (born 2003), American baseball player
- Willie Cauley-Stein
