= McAuley High School =

McAuley High School can refer to:

- McAuley High School (Cincinnati, Ohio), USA
- McAuley High School (Toledo, Ohio), USA
- McAuley High School (New Zealand)
- The McAuley Catholic High School, England
