= Macaulay (surname) =

Irish surname

- Pronunciation: /məˈkɔːli/ mə-KAWL-ee
- Gender: Unisex
- Language: English

Origin
- Languages: Irish (Ir), Scottish Gaelic (SG)
- Origin: 1. MacAmhalghaidh (SG), Mac Amhalghaidh (Ir); 2. MacAmhlaibh (SG), MacAmhlaidh (SG), Mac Amhlaoibh (Ir)

Other names
- Variant forms: Macauley, MacAulay, McAulay, McAuley, MacCamley, McCamley, McKaley

Macaulay, Macauley, MacAulay, McAulay and McAuley are surnames of Irish origin originating in Westmeath, Leinster, anglicized from Irish Mac Amhalghaidh in the English language. The surname is also found in Scotland of distinct, but related, origins due to Irish settling in Scotland. Some of the Irish Macaulays settled in Scotland during the reign of Robert the Bruce. There are several etymological origins for the names: all of which originated as patronyms in several Gaelic languages—Irish and Scottish Gaelic. Although the English-language surnames are ultimately derived from Gaelic patronyms, the English-language surnames, and the modern Gaelic-language forms do not refer to the actual name of the bearer's father.

== Etymology ==
In some cases, the surnames are derived from the Scottish Gaelic MacAmhlaidh, or the Irish Gaelic Mac Amhalghaidh. These Gaelic surnames translate into English as "son of Amhalghaidh" or "son of Amhalghadh". The Gaelic surnames originated as a patronyms, however they no longer refer to the actual names of the bearer's father's. The personal name Amhalghaidh (also spelt Amhalghadh) is an old Gaelic name whose origin and meaning are uncertain.

In other cases, the surnames are derived from the Scottish Gaelic MacAmhlaibh or MacAmhlaidh, or the Irish Mac Amhlaoibh. These surnames translate into English as "son of Amhlaibh"; "son of Amhladh" or "son of Amhlaidh"; and "son of Amhlaoibh". The names Amhlaibh, Amhladh, Amhlaidh, and Amhlaoibh are Gaelic derivatives of the Old Norse personal names Áleifr and Olaf or Óláfr.

== Distribution ==
=== United States ===
In 1990, the United States Census Bureau undertook a study of the 1990 United States census, and released a sample of data concerning the most common names. According to this sample of 6.3 million people (who had 88,799 unique last names), "MACAULAY" (including Macaulay and MacAulay) ranked 12,186th most common last name, and was borne by 0.001 percent of the population sample. "MCAULAY" (McAulay) was much less common; it ranked 35,241st most common last name, and was borne by 0.000 percent of the population sample. Within the 2000 United States census, "MACAULAY" was the 12,764th most common last name, with 2,219 occurrences. "MCAULAY" was the 33,528th most common last name, with only 642 occurrences. The table below shows data concerning racial-ethnic aspects of the surnames in the 2000 United States census (note that two fields have been suppressed by the United States Census Bureau for confidentiality reasons, since "MCAULAY" had fewer than 1,000 people).

=== Scotland ===
Macaulay, MacAulay, and McAulay were not amongst the 100 most common surnames recorded in birth, death, and marriage registers in Scotland, in 1995. None of the surnames ranked amongst the 100 most common surnames recorded in birth, death, and marriage registrations in the combined years of 1999, 2000, and 2001. None of the surnames ranked amongst the most common surnames recorded in Scotland, in the United Kingdom Census 1901.

== People with the surnames ==
- List of people with surnames Macaulay, MacAulay or McAulay
