= Aulay Macaulay =

18th-century English tea dealer, shorthand inventor

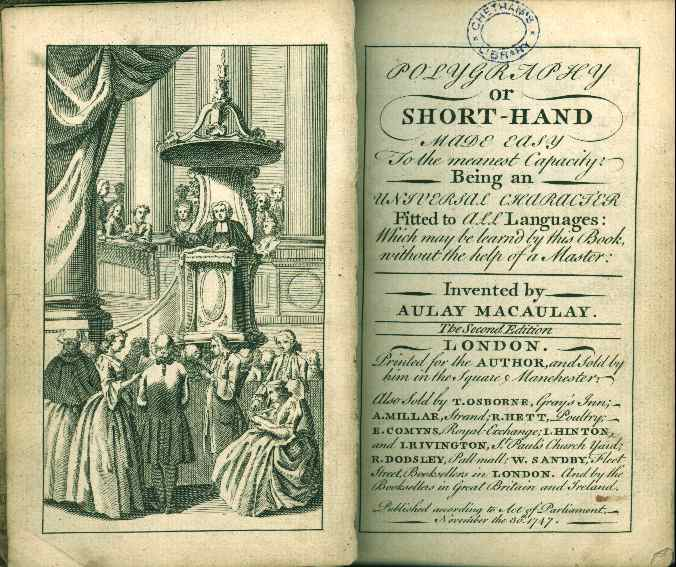
- Pages from the second edition of Macaulay's Polygraphy, published in 1747.
- Died: 19 March 1788; Manchester, England
- Occupation: tea-dealer

Aulay Macaulay (died 1788) was an 18th-century English tea-dealer, based in Manchester, who invented a system of shorthand which could be used in English and many other languages. He died on 19 March 1788, in Manchester.

In the 18th century Macaulay invented a system of shorthand, which he named "Polygraphy". His system was documented in a self-printed book titled Polygraphy or Shorthand Made Easy to the Meanest Capacity Being an Universal Character Fitted to All Languages Which may be learnt by this Book without the help of a Master, published in 1747. In order to ward off possible pirated editions of his work, Macaulay personally signed each copy, and wrote within the book: "whoever presumes to pirate my Book, will be prosecuted with the utmost Rigour".

His shorthand system was the first English system to include written vowels; and he was the first to intend his system for other languages. Within his book, he used his system to write a psalm in 8 different languages. His book included a dedication to George, Prince of Wales (who would later become George III, King of the United Kingdom of Great Britain and Ireland).
