= Sept =

Gaelic family division

A sept (/sɛpt/) is a division of a family, especially of a Scottish or Irish family. The term is used both in Scotland and in Ireland, where it may be translated as Irish sliocht, meaning "progeny" or "seed", and may indicate the descendants of a person (for example, Irish: Sliocht Bhriain Mhic Dhiarmada, "the descendant of Brian MacDermott"). The word may derive from the Latin saeptum, meaning "enclosure" or "fold", or via an alteration of the English-language word "sect".

== Family branches ==
Síol is a Gaelic word meaning "progeny" or "seed" that is used in the context of a family or clan with members who bear the same surname and inhabit the same territory, as a manner of distinguishing one group from another; a family called Mac an Bháird (anglicised as "Ward") might be divided into septs such as Síol Sheáin Mhic Bhriain, Síol Chonchobhair Óig, Síol Sheáin Chuinn, or Síol Chon Chonnacht.

Each of these individual septs may further subdivide into more septs, which may sometimes lead to the development of novel surnames and/or the rise of the family such that it may be considered a clan in its own right. Such septs were common in Scotland, where the clan system was well-developed.

== Scotland ==
In the context of Scottish clans, septs are families that followed another family's chief, or part of the extended family and that hold a different surname. These smaller septs would then be part of the chief's larger clan. A sept might follow another chief if two families were linked through marriage, or, if a family lived on the land of a powerful laird, they would follow him whether they were related or not. Bonds of manrent were sometimes used to bind lesser chiefs and his followers to more powerful chiefs. According to the Oxford Companion to Scottish History, the MacMartins of Letterfinlay who were a sept of the Clan Cameron would have seen themselves as distinct within their own lands, but would have also seen themselves as Camerons if operating elsewhere outside Lochaber. Bonds of manrent and friendship tied obviously non-related kin groups into a wider military, political, and land/food resource sharing clanship.

Today, sept lists are used by clan societies to recruit new members. Such lists date back to the 19th century, when clan societies and tartan manufacturers attempted to capitalise on the enthusiasm and interest for all things Scottish. Lists were drawn up that linked as many surnames as possible to a particular clan, regardless of whether there was an actual historical connection to that clan surname. In this way, individuals without a "clan name" could connect to a Scottish clan and thus feel "entitled" to its tartan.

Also, common surnames, found throughout the British Isles, were linked to particular clans. For example, the surname Miller/Millar was made a sept of Clan MacFarlane, and Taylor of Clan Cameron, Mason was made a sept of Clan Sinclair. Furthermore, patronymic forms of common personal names were also linked to particular clans. This has led to the false impression that many surnames have one origin and are all related to one another, and that such surnames are historically connected to one particular clan.

== Ireland ==
Historically, the term "sept" was not used in Ireland until the 19th century, long after any notion of clanship had been eradicated. The English word "sept" is most accurate in referring to a subgroup within a large clan, particularly when that group has taken up residence outside their clan's original territory (e.g. the O'Neills, MacSweeneys, and O'Connors).

Related Irish clans often belong to larger groups, dynasties, such as the Dál gCais, Uí Néill, Uí Fiachrach, and Uí Maine.

Recently, Edward MacLysaght suggested the English word "sept" be used in place of the word 'clan' with regard to the historical social structure in Ireland, to differentiate it from the centralised Scottish clan system. This would imply that Ireland possessed no formalised clan system, which is not wholly accurate. Brehon Law, the ancient legal system of Ireland clearly defined the clan system in pre-Norman Ireland, with its electoral system limited to the senior sept's members (see derbfine), which collapsed after the Tudor Conquest in the 16th century. The Irish, when speaking of themselves, employed their term "clann", which means "children" in Irish.

== See also ==
- Dit name
- Irish genealogy
- Mac Amhlaoibh and Mac Amhalghaidh (Irish septs)
- Sippe
