= Alexander MacAuley (footballer) =

Scottish footballer (1927–2006)

Alexander Macaulay
Personal information
- Full name: Alexander John Macaulay
- Date of birth: 23 September 1927
- Place of birth: Clydebank, Scotland
- Date of death: 2006 (aged 78–79)
- Position: Inside right

Youth career
- Edinburgh University

Senior career*
Years	Team	Apps	(Gls)
1945–1950	Queen's Park	70	(32)
1950–1953	Dunfermline Athletic	38	(14)
1953	East Fife	2	(0)

International career
1949	Scotland Amateurs	2	(1)
- * Club domestic league appearances and goals

Alexander Macaulay (23 September 1927 – 2006) was a Scottish footballer who played as an inside right in the Scottish League for Queen's Park and Dunfermline Athletic. He was capped by Scotland at amateur level.

== Playing career ==
Macaulay began his football career with Edinburgh University before joining amateur club Queen's Park in 1945. During his five-year tenure at Hampden Park, he made 70 appearances in all competitions and scored 32 goals.

In 1950, he transferred to Dunfermline Athletic, where he scored 14 goals in 38 senior league matches over three seasons. He finished his Scottish Football League career in 1953 with a brief stint at East Fife, making two league appearances.

He represented his country at the amateur level, Macaulay earned two caps for the Scotland Amateurs in 1949, scoring one goal
