= McAuley (surname) =

- Gender: Unisex
- Language: English

Origin
- Languages: Irish (Ir), Scottish Gaelic (SG)
- Origin: 1. MacAmhalghaidh (SG), Mac Amhalghaidh (Ir); 2. MacAmhlaibh (SG), MacAmhlaidh (SG), Mac Amhlaoibh (Ir)

Other names
- Variant forms: MacAuley, Macauley

McAuley, MacAuley, and Macauley are Scottish and Irish surnames. There are several etymological origins for the names: all of which originated as patronyms in Gaelic languages—Irish and Scottish Gaelic. Although these English-language (Anglicized) forms of the surnames are ultimately derived from Gaelic patronyms, they do not refer to the actual name of the bearer's father. The surname is quite common in Ireland, particularly in Ulster.

== Etymology ==
In some cases, the surnames are derived from the Scottish Gaelic MacAmhalghaidh, and Irish Mac Amhalghaidh. These Gaelic surnames translates into English as "son of Amhalghaidh" or "son of Amhalghadh". The Gaelic surnames originated as a patronyms; however, they no longer refer to the actual names of the bearer's father's. The personal name Amhalghaidh (also spelt Amhalghadh) is an old Gaelic name, and its etymological origin and meaning are uncertain.

In other cases, the surnames are derived from the Scottish Gaelic MacAmhlaibh or MacAmhlaidh, or the Irish Mac Amhlaoibh. These surnames translate into English as "son of Amhlaibh"; "son of Amhladh" or "son of Amhlaidh"; and "son of Amhlaoibh". The surnames originated as a patronyms; however, they no longer refer to the actual name of the bearer's father. The names Amhlaibh, Amhladh, Amhlaidh, and Amhlaoibh are Gaelic derivatives of the Old Norse personal names Áleifr and Óláfr.

== Distribution ==
=== Ireland (including the Republic of Ireland and Northern Ireland) ===
In Ireland, the surnames are very common in the province of Ulster; they are also common in Dublin, in the Republic of Ireland. According to historian C. Thomas Cairney, the Irish McAuleys were a chiefly family of the Oirghialla or Airgíalla tribe who were in turn from the Laigin tribe who were the third wave of Celts to settle in Ireland during the first century BC.

=== United States ===
In 1990, the United States Census Bureau undertook a study of the 1990 United States census, and released a sample of data concerning the most common names. According to this sample of 6.3 million people (who had 88,799 unique last names), "MACAULEY" (including MacAuley and Macauley) ranked 20,117th-most-common last name, and was borne by 0.000 percent of the population sample. "MCAULEY" (McAuley) was much more common; it ranked 7,139th-most-common last name, and was borne by 0.002 percent of the population sample. Within the 2000 United States census, "MACAULEY" was the 15,676th-most-common last name, with 1,711 occurrences. "MCAULEY" was the 7,765th-most-common last name, with 3,946 occurrences. The table below shows data concerning racial-ethnic aspects of the surnames in the 2000 United States census.

Name	Percent White only	Percent Black only	Percent Asian and Pacific Islander only	Percent American Indian and Alaskan Native only	Percent two or more races	Percent Hispanic
MACAULEY	83.87	10.87	1.17	0.41	2.4	1.29
MCAULEY	87.63	8.84	0.48	0.35	1.09	1.6

=== Scotland ===
McAuley, MacAuley, and Macauley were not amongst the 100 most common surnames recorded in birth, death, and marriage registers in Scotland, in 1995. None of the surnames ranked amongst the 100 most common surnames recorded in birth, death, and marriage registrations in the combined years of 1999, 2000, and 2001. None of the surnames ranked amongst the most common surnames recorded in Scotland, in the United Kingdom census 1901.

== People with the surname ==
MacAuley

- Alexander MacAuley (footballer), Scottish footballer
- Morton MacAuley, Canadian politician

Macauley

- Ed Macauley (1928–2011), American professional basketball player, known by the nickname "Easy Ed Macauley"
- James Macauley (1889–1945), Irish professional footballer
- Robie Macauley (1919–1995), American writer and editor
- Steve Macauley (born 1969), English professional footballer

McAuley

- Alphonso McAuley, American actor
- Andrew McAuley (1968–2007), Australian adventurer
- Bob McAuley (1904–1994), Scottish-Canadian football player
- Bryn McAuley (born 1989), Canadian voice actress
- Catherine McAuley (1787–1841), Irish Catholic nun and founder of the Sisters of Mercy
- Charles McAuley (1910–1999), Irish painter
- Dave McAuley (born 1961), Northern Irish professional boxer
- Gareth McAuley (born 1979), Northern Irish professional footballer
- Gareth McAuley (born 1992), Northern Irish sports shooter, bronze medalist in Men's skeet at the 2018 Commonwealth Games
- Hugh McAuley (footballer, born 1953), English professional footballer and coach
- Hugh McAuley (footballer, born 1976), English professional footballer
- Ike McAuley (1891–1928), American professional baseball player
- James McAuley (1917–1976), Australian academic, journalist
- Jimmy McAuley (1901–1944), Northern Irish football player
- Jerry McAuley (1839–1884), Irish-born American convicted criminal, who founded America's first gospel rescue mission
- Ken McAuley (1931–1992) Canadian professional ice hockey player
- Linda McAuley, British radio presenter
- Maria McAuley (1847–1919), American co-founder of the McAuley Water St Mission, in New York City
- Pat McAuley (1921–1970), Scottish footballer
- Paul J. McAuley (born 1955), British author
- Pearse McAuley (born c. 1965), Irish Provisional IRA Volunteer
- Robin McAuley (born 1953), Irish musician
- Roisin McAuley, Irish novelist
- Sean McAuley (born 1972), English footballer
- Tony McAuley (1939–2003), Irish TV and radio director and producer
- William McAuley (born 1975), better known by his stage name Bleu, American musician, singer, songwriter, and record producer

McCauley

- Linda McCauley, American scientist

== See also ==
- Irish clans
