= Aulay =

Aulay is a Scottish masculine given name. It is an Anglicisation of the Scottish Gaelic Amhladh, Amhlaidh, Amhlaigh, and Amhlaibh. The standard Irish Gaelic form of these names is Amhlaoibh (pronounced [ˈəulˠiːvʲ], Munster Irish: [ˈəulˠiː]); which can be Anglicised as Auliffe and Humphrey.

The Old Irish personal name Amlaíb is a Gaelicised form of the Old Norse Óláfr, and is recorded in the Annals of Ulster as being introduced into Ulster by "Amlaíb, son of the king of Lochlann" In the 9th century, Óláfr may have been pronounced more like the Old Norse Áleifr. A Classical Gaelic form of this Old Irish name is Amhlaíbh.

The older Irish Gaelic names Amalgaid and Amhalghaidh (pronounced "owl-ghee"), were borne by an early king of Munster, and an early king of Connacht. Even though these names were of a different origin than the above Gaelicised Norse names, they were "totally confused" in the later Middle Ages with them. In later times, Amalgaid and Amhalghaidh were Anglicised as Auley; as well as Awley, which was a spelling commonly used by the Magawleys of Calry.

In the Irish counties of Antrim and Armagh, Amley is found as a variant of Aulay or Auley and gives rise to the surname MacAmley or Macamley.

== Notable people with these names ==
=== Personal name ===
Aulay

- Aulay Macaulay (died 1788), an English inventor of a system of shorthand
- Sir Aulay MacAulay of Ardincaple (died 1617), a Scottish clan chief
- Aulay MacAulay Morrison (1863–1942), a Canadian lawyer and politician

Amhlaoibh

- Amhlaoibh Ó Súilleabháin (1780–1838), an Irish language author, linen draper, politician, and one time hedge school master

Amalgaid

- Amalgaid mac Congalaig (died 718), an Irish king of Brega, from the Uí Chonaing sept of Cnogba (Knowth) of the Síl nÁedo Sláine branch of the southern Ui Neill
- Amalgaid mac Éndai (died 601), an Irish king of Munster, from the Eóganacht Áine branch of the Eoganachta
- Amalgaid mac Fiachrae (died 440), an Irish king of Connacht, from the Ui Fiachrach sept

Amlaíb

- Amlaíb Conung (died c.875), a Norse or Norse-Gael leader in Ireland and Scotland in the years after 850.
- Amlaíb mac Sitriuc, the son of the Norse-Gael king of Dublin, Sigtrygg Silkbeard, a member of the Uí Ímharr dynasty
- Amlaíb Cuarán, a 10th-century Norse-Gael who was king of York and king of Dublin
- Amlaíb of Scotland (died 977), was king of Scots during the 970s
- Amlaíb mac Gofraid (died 941), a member of the Norse-Gael Uí Ímair dynasty, was king of Dublin from 934 to 941
- Olaf II of Norway, the Norse-Gaels called him Amlaíb
- Amlaíb Ua Donnabáin (died 1201), king of Uí Chairpre Áebda slain by William de Burgh and the O'Briens

=== Within a patronymic name ===
Amalgado

- Conaing mac Amalgado (died 742), an Irish king of Brega, from the Uí Chonaing sept of Cnogba (Knowth) of the Síl nÁedo Sláine branch of the southern Ui Neill
- Cúán mac Amalgado (died 641), an Irish king of Munster, from the Eóganacht Áine branch of the Eóganachta
- Dúngal mac Amalgado (died 759), an Irish king of Brega, from the Uí Chonaing sept of Cnogba (Knowth) of the Síl nÁedo Sláine branch of the southern Ui Neill

=== Other ===
- Cín Lae Amhlaoibh, an Irish language diary written by Amhlaoibh Ó Súilleabháin
- Dónall Mac Amhlaigh (1926–1989), an Irish writer
- Dùn Anlaimh, a crannog located on the Hebridean island of Coll, Scotland
- Dunan Aula, a cist located in Craignish, Argyll and Bute, Scotland; traditionally named after "Olaf, son of the king of Denmark"
- Mac Amhlaoibh and Mac Amhalghaidh (Irish septs), Irish septs and clans
- Muireann Nic Amhlaoibh (born 1978), an Irish musician and singer from County Kerry, Ireland

== "Hamlet" hypothesis ==
Hugh Kenner (1989) has argued that the name Amloði (the Old Icelandic form of the name Hamlet) originates with the Irish form Amhlaoibh.

== See also ==
- List of Irish-language given names
- List of Scottish Gaelic given names
