= Clan MacAulay =

Scottish clan historically seated at Ardincaple Castle, in Scotland

- Clann Amhlaoibh
- Crest: A boot couped at the ankle and thereon a spur Proper
- Motto: Dulce periculum

Profile
- Region: Highland
- District: Argyll
- Plant badge: Scots fir or cranberry
- Clan MacAulay no longer has a chief, and is an armigerous clan
- The Laird of Ardincaple
- Historic seat: Ardencaple Castle
- Last Chief: Aulay MacAulay
- Died: about 1767

Clan MacAulay (Scottish Gaelic: Clann Amhlaoibh, [ˈkʰl̪ˠãũn̪ˠ ˈãũl̪ˠɤv]), also spelt Macaulay or Macauley is a Scottish clan. The clan was historically centred on the lands of Ardincaple, which are today consumed by the little village of Rhu and burgh of Helensburgh in Argyll and Bute. The MacAulays of Ardincaple were located mainly in the traditional county of Dunbartonshire, which straddles the "Highland Line" between the Scottish Highlands and Lowlands. Clan MacAulay has been considered a "Highland clan" by writers and has been linked by various historians to the original Earls of Lennox and in later times to Clan Gregor. The MacAulays of Ardincaple, like Clan Gregor and several other clans, have traditionally been considered one of the seven clans which make up Siol Alpin. This group of clans were said to have claimed descent from Cináed mac Ailpín, King of the Picts, from whom later kings of Scotland traced their descent. The chiefs of Clan MacAulay were styled Laird of Ardincaple.

Clan MacAulay dates, with certainty, to the 16th century. The clan was engaged in several feuds with neighbouring clans. However, the clan's fortunes declined in the 17th and 18th centuries. After the decline and fall of Clan MacAulay, which ended with the death of Aulay MacAulay in the mid-18th century, the clan became dormant. With the revival of interest in Scottish clans in the 20th century a movement was organised to revive Clan MacAulay. The modern organisation strove to unite the three unrelated groups of MacAulays, and all who bore the surname MacAulay, under one clan and chief. In 2002, the clan appointed a potential chief of Clan MacAulay, but his petition for formal recognition was denied by the Lord Lyon King of Arms. The Lord Lyon ruled that the petitioner did not meet two criteria: anyone without a blood link to a past chief must be Clan Commander for ten years before being considered for recognition, and that the chiefship in question was of the MacAulays of Ardincaple and not of all MacAulays. To date, Clan MacAulay does not have a chief recognised by the Lord Lyon King of Arms, and therefore can be considered an Armigerous clan.

There are many different families of MacAulays from both Ireland and Scotland which are not related and are considered to have no historical connection with Clan MacAulay. These include the Scottish Macaulays from the Western Isles (the Macaulays of Lewis and possibly the MacAulays of Uist). Irish families of MacAulays with no connection with Clan MacAulay are the McAuleys of County Offaly and County Westmeath, the McAuleys in Ulster (County Fermanagh), and the "MacAuleys of the Glens" (County Antrim). The "MacAuleys of the Glens", however, have been thought to have been originally Scottish.

== Origins ==
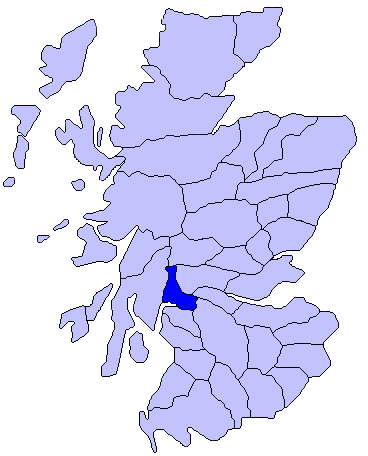
Location of the Lennox in relation to Scotland.

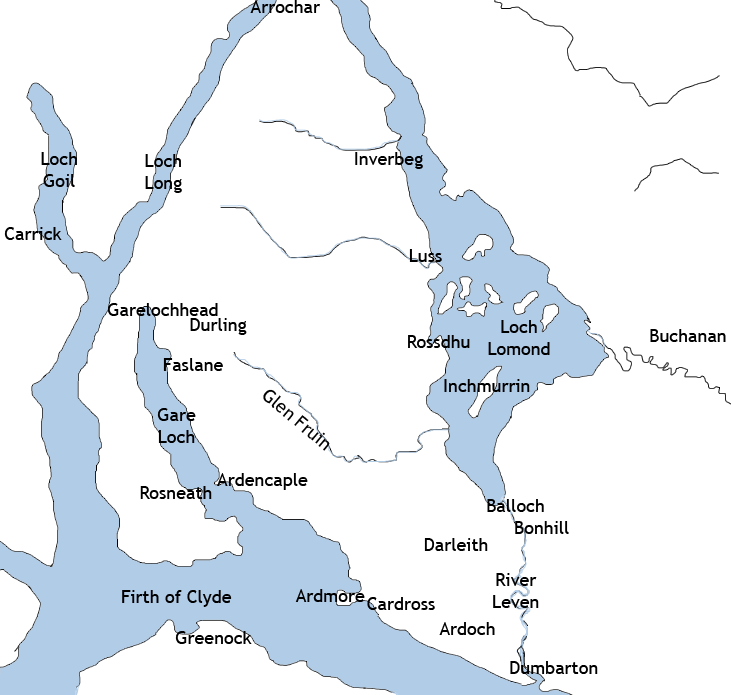
Area of influence of Clan MacAulay within the Lennox.

Clan MacAulay, or the family of the MacAulays of Ardincaple, is first recorded within the lands of Dunbartonshire, which was controlled in the Middle Ages by the mormaers (earls) of Lennox. Within the kindred of the mormaers, forms of the Gaelic given name Amhlaíbh were used by family members; and today the patronymic form of this name can be Anglicised as MacAulay. One such Amhlaíbh was a younger son of Ailín II, Earl of Lennox. This Amhlaíbh was the subject of a lay attributed to the poet Muireadhach Albanach Ó Dálaigh in which Muireadhach's Lennox property was named Ard nan Each. (Note: Clancy stated that the location of Ard nan Each was unidentified. His version of the lay, lines 9–12 runs thus: "Amhlaíbh, you dark eyebrowed man, / we don't prosper on your land: / being yours at Ard nan Each– / woe that you plot my bondage!". Newton's version, lines 9–12, runs thus: "O Amhlaoibh, O brown eyebrowed one, / Your land does not befit me / Which you have at Ard nan Each; / Woe to the person who conspires at my hindrance".) The Gaelic àrd means "high"; and each means "horse". Amhlaíbh and his descendants were the lords of Faslane and an extensive tract of land along the Gare Loch. The seat of Clan MacAulay was located at Ardincaple, which is situated on the shores of the Gare Loch in what is now the village of Rhu and town of Helensburgh. The place-name Ardincaple has been stated to be derived the Gaelic form of "cape of the horses" and "height of the horses". (Note: Watson gave "cape of the horses". Newton gave "height of the horses".) According to William Charles Maughan writing at the end of the 19th century, the Ardincaple estate had two main residences, one at Ardincaple, the other to the north at Faslane. Maughan stated that the site of the castle of Faslane could be distinguished, at the time of his writing, "by a small mound near the murmuring burn which flows into the bay". Geoffrey Stell's census of mottes in Scotland lists only four in Dunbartonshire; one of which is Faslane (grid reference NS249901), another listed as a "possible" is at Shandon (grid reference NS257878); Shandon being located between site of Faslane and the town of Helensburgh. Maughan wrote that at Faslane there stood an oak tree at place called in Scottish Gaelic Cnoch-na-Cullah (English: "knoll of the cock"). According to legend, when a cock crowed beneath the branches of the old oak upon the knoll, a member of Clan MacAulay was about to die. (Note: Maughan wrote: "A good way down from the house, near the shore, there stands the old oak tree, under whose boughs, according to tradition, the crowing of a cock presaged the death of a Macaulay. The name of the spot Cnoch-na-Cullah, or "Knoll of the Cock" seems appropriate to the legend".)

The actual ancestry of Clan MacAulay is uncertain. The recorded chiefs of the clan were the lairds of Ardincaple and styled with the territorial designation: of Ardincaple. The early 18th century Scottish heraldist Alexander Nisbet claimed the clan descended from Morice de Arncappel who was listed in the Ragman Rolls as swearing homage to Edward I in 1296. (Note: According to Bain, the seal is blazoned: a "Stag's head cabossed; between the antlers a small animal and fleur-de-lys: 'S' MAURIC' DE ARNCAPIL.'".) According to Nisbet, "Maurice de Arncaple is the ancestor of the Lairds of Ardincaple in Dunbartonshire, who were designed Ardincaples of that Ilk, till King James V.'s time, that Alexander, then the head of the family, took a fancy and called himself Alexander Macaulay of Ardincaple, from a predecessor of his own of the name of Aulay, to humour a patronymical designation, as being more agreeable to the head of a clan than the designation of Ardincaple of that Ilk". Later the 18th century antiquary (and chief of Clan MacFarlane) Walter MacFarlane stated that the MacAulays of Ardincaple derived their name from an Aulay MacAulay of that Ilk, who lived during the reign of James III (reigned 1440–1488). (Note: "Lower upon the firth of Clyde is Ardincaple antiently possessed by a family of the same surname, but about the reign of King James the 3rd from Aulay Ardincaple of that Ilk, the name of M^{c}Aulay came to be the surname of this antient family whose successour is Archibald McAulay of Ardincaple".)

According to George Fraser Black, the territorial designation Ardincaple did not become an ordinary surname until the 15th century. Several men with the surname Ardincaple or styled of Ardincaple are recorded in the Mediaeval Scottish records. Johannes de Ardenagappill was a charter witness in Lennox in about 1364. Arthur de Ardincapel witnessed a charter by Donnchadh, Earl of Lennox in about 1390. In 1489, a remission was granted to Robert Arnegapill for his part in the holding of Dumbarton Castle against the king of Scots. Later in 1513, Aulay Arngapill of that Ilk is mentioned in records. Later in 1529, an escheat of goods of Awlane Ardincapill of that Ilk is recorded. (Note: Black stated that Awlane is a miscopying error for Awlaue which equates to Aulay.) According to the 19th-century historian Joseph Irving, an early laird of Ardincaple was Alexander de Ardincaple, who in 1473, served on the inquest of the Earl of Menteith. Another laird, Aulay de Ardincaple, was invested on a precept from John Stewart, 3rd Earl of Lennox, in the lands of Faslane adjoining Ardincaple in 1518. Aulay and his wife, Katherine Cunningham, had sasine of the lands of Ardincaple in 1525. Several historians have stated that the first Laird of Ardincaple to take the surname MacAulay was Alexander de Ardincaple, son of this Aulay de Ardincaple. Alexander lived during the reign of James V (reigned 1513–1542). There is record in 1536 of an Awla McAwla of Ardencapill; another Awla McAwla was clerk of the watch of Queen Mary's guard in 1566.

== History ==
During the 15th and 16th centuries in west Dunbartonshire, the clans MacFarlane, MacAulay, and Colquhoun raided and plundered each other's lands and combined to sweep the lowlands of its flocks and herds. Other clans—among them the MacGregors, Campbells, Camerons and Buchanans—invaded the district later. In July 1567, after Mary, Queen of Scots, was forced to abdicate the Scottish throne in favour of her infant son, James, Walter MacAulay of Ardincaple was one of the signators of the bond to protect the young prince. "The Laird of M'Cawla of Ardincaple" appears in the General Band of 1587 as a principal vassal of the Duke of Lennox. In 1594, the "M'Cawlis" appear in the Roll of Broken Clans.

=== Feud with clans Buchanan and Galbraith ===
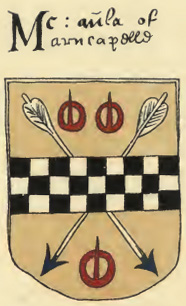
A facsimile of the arms of "Mc: aula of Arncapelle". (Note: Note the similarity to various Stewart arms: "... branches of the Stewart family bear the basic coat with suitable difference. Thus Stewart of Barscube, near Barrochan, bears Or, a fess chequy azure and argent between three buckles gules".)

During the 16th century members of Clan MacAulay were in conflict with members of clans Buchanan and Galbraith. On 1 August 1590, Walter MacAulay, son of Allan MacAulay of Durling, was killed on the "Highway and street of Dunbarton" in a clash against a contingent of Buchanans, who were led by Thomas Buchanan, Sheriff Depute of Dunbarton. Also wounded in the encounter was Walter's brother, Duncan MacAulay, who was wounded through the "harn pan" (brain); John dhu MacGregor, who was wounded behind his shoulder blade so that "his lights and entrails might be seen" (lungs); James Colquhoun, who was wounded in the "wamb" (stomach); and others including a MacAulay, Miller, and MacGibbon. When a complaint was registered on 29 September, the defenders failed to appear and were "put to the horn" (denounced as rebels). On 6 October 1590, Thomas Buchanan of Blairlusk, John Buchanan, his son John Buchanan Burgess of Dunbarton, and others were formally charged in Edinburgh with the murder of Walter MacAulay. The accused were ordered to appear before the Justice at Edinburgh on 21 December 1590. The case was then deferred to March and again the accused failed to appear. The following May saw the Bond of Manrent between MacAulay of Ardincaple and MacGregor of Glenstrae, in which both chiefs swore to assist each other, their "kin and friends in all their honest actions against whatsoever person or persons the Kings Majesty being only excepted".

In spring of 1593, Robert Galbraith, Laird of Culcreuch, purchased a Commission of Justiciary (or a " Letter of Fire and Sword" used to legally attack and destroy another clan) to pursue Clan Gregor and "their ressetters and assisters". The MacAulays and Colquhouns were suspicious of Galbraith's real intentions and on 3 May 1593, the chiefs of the two clans complained to the Privy Council that Galbraith of Culcreuch had only purchased the commission under counsel from George Buchanan, and that Galbraith had no intentions of actually harassing the MacGregors. It seemed more likely that the Galbraiths, allied with the Buchanans, would direct their vengeance against the MacAulays and Colquhouns under the guise of hunting and clearing Clan Gregor from the Lennox. To complicate matters, the Laird of Ardincaple had married the Laird of Culcreuch's widowed mother against his consent and Galbraith had "gevin vp kindnes, and denunceit his euill-will to him with solempne vowis of revenge" (given up kindness, and denounced his evil will to MacAulay with solemn vows of revenge). Due to the influence of the Duke of Lennox, the Letter of Fire and Sword were taken from the Galbraiths and Buchanans. Ardincaple had however been sparing of the entire truth. No mention was made of the bond of manrent between him and the MacGregor chief. According to Ronald Williams, it is unlikely the Privy Council was aware of this bond between. Even so, the Privy Council required securities of Ardincaple not to assist Clan Gregor.

=== Siol Alpin: MacGregors and MacAulays ===
The traditional descent of the seven clans of Siol Alpin.

Around the end of the 16th century Clan Gregor were in constant disputes and were at times outlawed. In order to strengthen its position the clan proceeded to enter in alliances with clans who were reputed to share a common ancestry. One such alliance was concluded on 6 July 1571 between James Macgregor of that Ilk and Luchlin Mackinnon of Strathardill. Another such alliance was formalised twenty years later while the MacGregors were outlawed, on 27 May 1591 with Clan MacAulay. This formal agreement, known as a Bond of Manrent, was between Aulay MacAulay of Ardincaple and Alasdair MacGregor of Glenstrae. In the bond, Ardincaple acknowledged Glenstrae as his chief, and of being a cadet of the House of MacGregor, and therefore promised to pay the MacGregor chief his calp. The giving of calp, a tribute of cattle or the best eighth of a part of goods to a superior lord or chief, was a significant custom in Gaelic society. The contract between Ardincaple and Glenstrae gave the MacGregors some temporary relief from the Buchanans and Galbraiths. Prior to this contract, Ardincaple does not appear to have been involved with Clan Gregor in any way. According to Irving, even though the Ardincaple was at feud with the Buchanans it is unclear how such an alliance would benefit his own clan. Irving wrote that Ardincaple must have known that any connection with Clan Gregor "would end (as it actually did) in a manner most disastrous to all connected with the turbulent Macgregors".

According to the 19th-century historian William Forbes Skene, the contract is evidence of an ancestral connection between clans Gregor and MacAulay. Within the bond, both Ardincaple and Glenstrae stated that they were offshoots of the same family: "Alexander M'Gregor of Glenstray on the ane part and Awly M'Cawley of Ardingapill on the other part understanding ourselfs and our name to be M'Calppins of auld and to be our just and trew surname". (Note: Approximate translation into modern English: "Alasdair MacGregor of Glenstrae on the one part and Aulay MacAulay of Ardincaple on the other part, understanding ourselves and our names to be MacAlpins of old and to be our just and true surname".) Skene was of the opinion that the MacAulays did not descend from the Mediaeval earls of Lennox, and further concluded that Clan MacAulay was a member of Siol Alpin – a group of clans which could claim descent from Kenneth MacAlpin (Cináed mac Ailpín) whom Scots considered to be their first king. (Note: Skene wrote: "There can be no doubt, therefore, that the Macaulay's were a branch of the clan Alpine, and the mistake as to their origin has probably arisen from the similarity of name, and from their situation necessarily making them, for the time, followers of the earl of Lennox".) Later historians have shown that such bonds were used by the MacGregors to secure allegiances with weaker clans, and that such a bond was may have been forced upon the MacAulays by the more powerful MacGregors. (Note: George Eyre-Todd, writing in the early 20th century, states: "In 1591 the MacGregors were threatening to make things more than uncomfortable for their neighbours on the shores of Loch Lomond, Gareloch, and Loch Long. They secured the alliance of MacFarlane of Arrochar, and it was possibly only to protect himself from their vengeance that MacAulay in 1591 found it prudent to sign the bond of manrent".)

Following the Battle of Glen Fruin, between Clan Gregor and Clan Colquhoun in February 1603, there was much public outcry against the rebellious MacGregors. By an Act of the Privy Council, on 3 April 1603, it was made an offence to bear the name MacGregor, or to give and shelter to a MacGregor. The Earl of Argyll, who was responsible to the Privy Council for the actions of the MacGregors, was entrusted to bring the force of the law against this lawless clan. Being deeply suspicious of Ardincaple's dealings with Glenstrae, one of Argyll's first moves was to bring acts against Ardincaple. On 17 March 1603, Aulay MacAulay of Ardincaple and his sureties were ordered to appear and answer for aiding, supplying, and intercommuning with Alasdair MacGregor of Glenstrae and other MacGregors. He was also to answer for not "rising ye fray" and pursuing the outlawed clan Gregor in the Lennox. Ardincaple was accused of bringing the MacGregor "thevis and rebells" to the Colquhoun lands of Luss and for their part in stealing from the Colquhouns of Luss. Again the influence of the Duke of Lennox saved Ardincaple and his clan from the same fate as Glenstrae and his. On 7 April 1603, James VI wrote from Berwick to the Justice General and his deputies, declaring Ardincaple to be innocent of the alleged crimes and that he was to accompany the king to England with the Duke of Lennox. (Note: The king's letter states: "... And We, vnderstanding that the said Aulay M^{c}cauley is altogidder frie and innocent of the saidis allegit crymes laid to his chairge; and that he is to accumpany ws to our realme of Ingland, with our darrest cousing the Duik of Lennox, his maister ...". An approximate translation into modern English: "... And we, understanding that the said Aulay MacAulay is altogether free and innocent of the said alleged crimes laid to his charge; and that he is to accompany us to our realm of England, with our dearest cousin the Duke of Lennox, his master ...".) By the time the King's letter was received, Ardincaple had already left the Lennox district as part of the Duke of Lennox's train, which accompanied James VI on his way to England to be declared King James I of England. The outlawed Glenstrae was finally apprehended by Argyll on 18 January 1604 after almost a year in hiding. and brought to Edinburgh to stand trial. The illiterate Glenstrae consented to give a preliminary statement which was titled a 'confession' and convicted him out of his own mouth. Within his 'confession', Glenstrae accused Argyll of trying to persuade him to kill the chief of the MacAulays: "I Confess, before God, that he did all his craftie diligence to intyse me to slay and destroy the Laird Ardinkaippill, M^{c}kallay, for ony ganes kyndness or freindschip that he mycht do or gif me. The quhilk I did refuis, in respect of my faithfull promeis maid to M^{c}kallay of befor". (Note: Approximate translation into modern English: "I confess, before God, that he did all his crafty diligence to entice me to slay and destroy the Laird of Ardincaple, MacAulay, for any gain of kindness or friendship that he might do or give me. That which i did refuse, in respect of my fateful promise made to MacAulay before".)

=== Argyll's feud with Ardincaple ===
Archibald Campbell, 7th Earl of Argyll pursued a violent feud with Aulay MacAulay of Ardincaple during the late 16th and early 17th century. Argyll's lieutenants in the area were Duncan Campbell, Captain of Carrick and Neil Campbell of Lochgoilhead, who led raids into Ardincaple's lands attempting to slay the MacAulay chief. The Campbells of Carrick were seated at Carrick Castle on the shores of Loch Goil (about 15 kilometres (9.3 mi) northwest of Ardincaple). In 1598, Duncan Campbell the Captain of Carrick, registered a bond of 300 merks for each of his men in Rosneath to keep from harming Ardincaple. At the same time, Robert Sempill of Foulwood registered a bond of 2,000 merks for Campbell of Carrick to not harm Ardincaple and his followers. The following year, Lennox legally evicted Donald Campbell of Drongie and several of his followers from the lands of Mamoir, Mambeg, and Forlancarry along the banks of the Gare Loch. The Campbells of Drongie were close supporters of the Campbells of Carrick, and in retaliation a combined force of Campbells of Carrick and Drongie assembled at Rosneath (on opposite shore of the Gare Loch from Ardincaple) and laid waste to the duke's new acquisitions. When the case was presented to the Privy Council on 17 May 1600, both Campbell of Carrick and Campbell of Drongie were denounced as rebels.

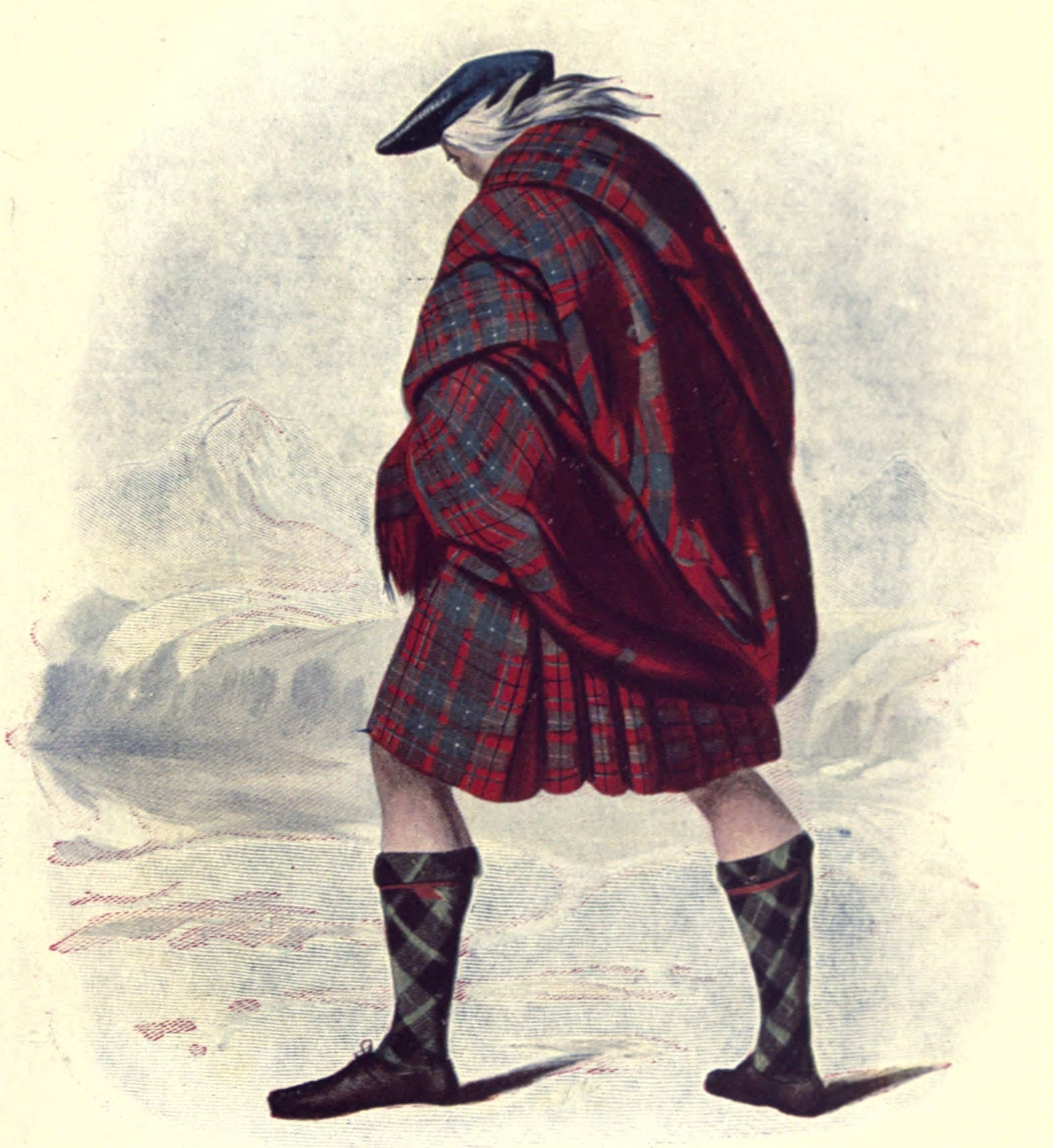
R.R. McIan's Victorian era romanticised depiction of a member of Clan MacAulay. The tartan depicted is not the most common 'MacAulay' tartan today; but a tartan attributed to Clan Cumming.

On 25 November 1600, evidence was brought forth to the Privy Council of an attempt on Ardincaple's life on 24 September 1600. The evidence pointed to the Captain of Carrick's men coming at night to Ardincaple and attacking followers of the laird and killing one, Malcolm Galbraith. A second attempt Ardincaple's life was carried out at night as he was staying at Nether Greenock. Ardincaple, Patrick Dennestoun (one of Ardincaple's servants), and Archibald Connel were all shot in the encounter. Again the Privy Council denounced the Captain of Carrick and his men as rebels. At the end of November 1600, the Captain of Carrick and 100 followers invaded the lands of Ardincaple armed with "hagbuts, pistolets, bows, darlochs and habershons". The force hid in the woods of Ardincaple for one night, taking several prisoners before fleeing. In the morning, a rider making towards the house of Ardincaple was presumed to be Ardincaple himself and nearly killed, before he was identified as a Campbell and servitor to the Earl of Argyll. Carrick's force, for fear of being pursued by men of the district, left the area after destroying houses, hamstringing animals, and making off with livestock belonging to other tenants of the duke. In the process the Carrick men "spuilyeit the houssis of John Dow McAula in Garelocheid and Patrik McCaula in Aldonit". For their actions, the participating Campbells were again denounced as rebels.

As stated before, Alasdair MacGregor of Glenstrae claimed in his confession that Argyll had attempted to convince him to slay Ardincaple. A record in The Treasurer's Books, dated November 1602, record one such instance: "Item, to Patrik M'Omeis, messinger, passand of Edinburghe, with Lettres to charge Ard Earle of Argyle to compeir personallie befoir the Counsall, the xvj day of December nixt, to ansuer to sic things as salbe inquirit at him, tuiching his lying at await for the Laird of Ardincapill, vpone set purpois to have slain him, xvj li".

=== After 1600 ===
After the episode at Glen Fruin between clans Gregor and Colquhoun in 1603, western Dunbartonshire slowly became more "settled" or peaceful. The MacGregors ceased to exist as a clan and the resident clans of MacAulay, MacFarlane, and Buchanan became less powerful as their lands slowly passed into the hands of strangers. In 1614, Angus Og MacDonald of Dunyvaig seized Dunyvaig Castle, which had been held by the Bishop of the Isles. Sir Aulay MacAulay of Ardincaple, with twenty of his men, accompanied the Bishop to Islay to demand the surrender of the castle.

On 26 March 1639, Covenanters captured Dumbarton Castle to prevent it from being used as a Royalist base in the event of an invasion from Ireland. Once secured, the Earl of Argyll placed Walter MacAulay, Laird of Ardincaple, as keeper of the castle with a garrison of forty men. In 1648, the parish of Row (modern Rhu) was created at the instigation of Aulay MacAulay, Laird of Ardincaple, who wanted to separate from the parish of Rosneath on the opposite side of the Gare Loch. He built the first parish kirk a year later and provided land for the kirk, minster's manse, and garden.

The Glorious Revolution of 1688 saw the overthrow of the Roman Catholic, James II of England, in favour of the Protestant, William III of Orange. Though most of the English accepted William, Jacobites within Ireland and Scotland opposed him in favour of the deposed James. In 1689, the Earl of Argyll's offer to raise a regiment of 600 men in aid of William was accepted. Argyll's regiment was to consist of 10 companies of about 60 men each. That same year, Archibald MacAulay of Ardincaple raised a company of fencibles in aid of William. William and his wife Mary were crowned King and Queen of Scotland as William II and Mary II on 5 November 1689. In 1690, "Ardencaple's Company" within the Earl of Argyll's Regiment was commanded by Captain Archibald MacAulay of Ardencaple, Lieutenant John Lindsay, and Ensign Robert MacAulay "Anshent" (ancient). Later in 1694, Archibald's younger brother, Robert, is listed as Captain Robert MacAulay in the Earl of Argyll's Regiment of Foot. Even after the revolution had succeeded there was still a fear of invasion in Dunbartonshire by adherents to the expelled Jacobite king. Local parishes were required to muster their men. An example of the size of one particular muster around 1693 is as follows: in Kilmaronock, fifty men and ten guns; in Gleneagles, seventy-four men and three-score swords; in Luss, seventy men "with arms conforme"; in Cardross, one hundred men and thirty stand of arms; and in Rhu, there were eighty-men and fifty-six firelocks. At first the individual parishes selected their own officers, but at general musters they were divided into two companies—one containing those above Leven, and those living below in the other. At a shire mustering at Kilpatrick in 1696, MacAulay of Ardincaple was selected as Captain of the company above Leven, with Noble of Ferme, Lieutenant, and Dugald MacFarlane of Tullibintall, Ensign.

At the beginning of the 18th century, a group of MacAulays migrated to the former counties of Caithness and Sutherland. William Buchanan of Auchmar's 18th-century account of the surname MacAulay stated that a group of MacAulays in Caithness claimed to descend from the MacAulays of Ardincaple.

==== In Ireland ====
During the early 17th century, Clan MacAulay was involved in the Plantation of Ulster, as James VI began colonising regions of Ireland with English and Scottish settlers. Several MacAulays were transplanted from Scotland to Ulster during this era. One such region was the precinct of Portlough (within the barony of Raphoe, in County Donegal) which comprised 12,000 acres (49 km^{2}; 19 sq mi). In 1610, Ludovic Stewart, 2nd Duke of Lennox was allotted 3,000 acres (12 km^{2}; 4.7 sq mi) of land within the precinct. There were eight other allotments; one of which was of 1,000 acres (4.0 km^{2}; 1.6 sq mi) to Alexander MacAulay of Durling, gentleman. (Note: Hill lists the grant to Alexander MacAulay of Durling, as: "Grant to Alexander McAula of Durlin, gent. The small proportion of Ballyweagh, or Ballyneagh, containing Mullanchelosk, one quarter; Boylelawny, one quarter; Ballyveagh, one quarter; Levallymore, one quarter; Ballyivegly, 2 quarters; and 2/3 of a quarter of Roughan, next to Ballyvegly; in all 1,000 acres, with free fishing in Loughswilly. Three out of eight parts of the quarter of Negracky, containing 60 acres, are excepted from this grant. The premises are created in the manor of Ballyreagh, with 300 acres in demesne, and a court baron. Rent. 5l. 6s. 8d. Irish. To Hold forever, as of the castle of Dublin, in common socage, 16 July, 8th [1610]".) The king appointed various commissioners to visit the landlords to whom the allotments were made in order to take account of their progress. In July 1611, on such inspection was made in the precinct of Portlough. The report stated of the duke's allotment: "Duke of Lennox, chief undertaker of 2000 acres. Sir Aulant Aula, Knight, his agent, resident, with some British families; no preparation for building, save some timber trees felled and squared". For the allotment to Alexander MacAulay of Durling, the report stated: "Alexander McAula of Durlinge; 1000 acres; appeared not, nothing done". In 1619, Nicholas Pynnar surveyed the undertakers and recorded of the Duke of Lennox's portion: "3000 acres, Duke of Lennox: a very strong castle, built of lime and stone, but no freeholders. The well inhabited and full of people". For the MacAulay portion the report stated: "1000 acres, Alexander McAula: stone house and bawn; 2 freeholders, 9 lessees; able to produce 30 men with arms". (Note: Pynnar's survey of the MacAulay portion, as published by Hill in 1877, reads: Alexander McAwley alias Stewart hath 1,000 acres, called Ballyneagh. Upon this there is built a Bawne of Lime and Stone 70 feet square, with four Flankers, and a Stone House in it. I find planted and estated upon this Land, of Brittish Birth, Freeholders, 2, viz., 1 having 200 acres. 1 having 60 acres. Lesses for years, 9, viz., 3 having 200 acres le piece. 2 having 180 acres. 1 having 120 acres. 2 having 60 acres le piece. 1 having 40 acres. Total, 11 Families, who, with their Undertenants, are to make 30 Men armed; these have taken Oath of Supremecy. Here is good store of Tillage, and I saw not one Irish Family on the Land.) Later, Alexander MacAulay of Durling, also known as 'Alexander MacAulay, alias Stewart', sold his allotment to Alexander Stewart. According to Hill, Alexander Stewart was the ancestor of the Stewart Marquesses of Londonderry. Alexander MacAulay of Durling also succeeded Sir Aulay Macaulay as Laird of Ardincaple and chief of Clan MacAulay.

A branch of the MacAulays of Ardincaple settled in County Antrim, with the leading member of the family owning the Glenarm estate for some time until it passed to the MacDougalls in 1758. (Note: "A branch of the MacAuleys settled in the county of Antrim, and there acquired the estate of Glenerm; but Ardincaple changed proprietors, and the estate was acquired by its present possessors, the MacDougalls, by whom it was entailed in August 1758".)

=== Fall of the clan and loss of Ardincaple ===
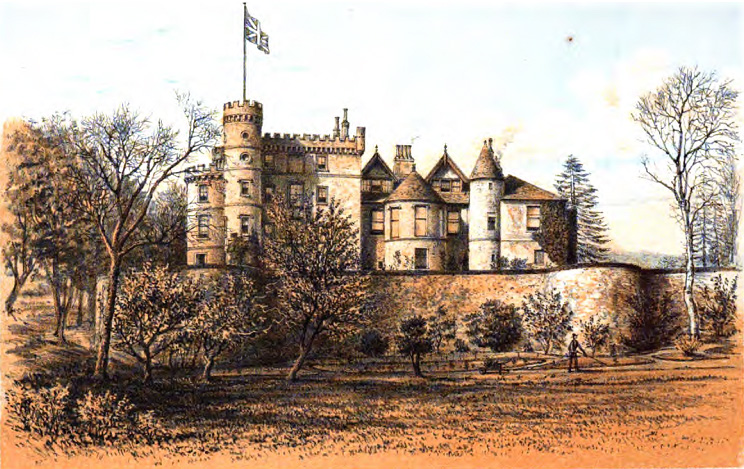
Ardencaple Castle c. 1879, then occupied by H. E. Crum-Ewing of Srathleven, Lord Lieutenant of Dunbartonshire.

The power of Clan MacAulay and the fortune of the Lairds of Ardincaple diminished from the 17th century into the 18th century. Successive lairds were forced to divide and sell, piece by piece, the lands once governed by the clan. As the laird's resources dried up, their lands fell into decay, and the once expansive lands of Ardincaple shrank to only a few farms.

The last Macaulays seem to have been a perfect type of the true old Celtic school of men who thought much of their Chiefery, of their old connection with Clan Gregor, and of the retainers whom they could send out to fight or reive in alliance with them, but who thought nothing of the acres under their own power which could be made to bear the fruits of industry and of peace.

— George Campbell, 8th Duke of Argyll, Scotland As It Was and As It Is.

By the early 1750s, even the roof of Ardincaple Castle, seat of the clan chief, had fallen in. The overall condition of the castle had deteriorated to such an extent that the next laird was forced to abandon it and live in nearby Laggarie. The bulk of the Ardincaple estate ultimately passed into the hands of John Campbell, 4th Duke of Argyll. The last chief of the MacAulays, Aulay MacAulay, died at High Laggarie (now encompassed by the tiny village of Rhu) landless and without an heir to succeed as chief in about 1767. In 1794, Lord Frederick Campbell (brother of John, 5th Duke of Argyll) supervised the draining of the marsh and bog-ridden former lands of the Lairds of Ardincaple. The poor state of the lands of Ardincaple before that year is illustrated in the statement by George Campbell, 8th Duke of Argyll: that much of the land could not bear the weight of a cow, and local men of the time remembered when horses would be lost in the bogholes prevalent in the area.

=== Modern era: clan associations ===
Since the death of the last chief, in the 18th century, the MacAulays of Ardincaple have ceased to exist as a clan. There is currently no clan chief, and no member of the clan has been granted the undifferenced arms of the MacAulays of Ardincaple. However, with a revival of Scottish interest in the 20th century several MacAulays unsuccessfully attempted to prove a genealogical link to the last chief, and a movement was organised to revive the clan. In 1997 Iain McMillan MacAulay was made interim leader, or clan commander. Later in 1998, during its first assembly, the organisation's objectives were determined: to unite three unrelated groups of MacAulays under one chief – Clan MacAulay (the MacAulays of Ardincaple), the Macaulays of Lewis, and the Macaulays of Wester Ross; this new chief would then, in effect, be chief of all MacAulays. In 1999 MacAulay intended to petition the Lord Lyon King of Arms to be recognised as chief but was challenged by Iain Davidson MacAulay, originally a native of Helensburgh who claimed a direct bloodline to the chiefs of the clan.

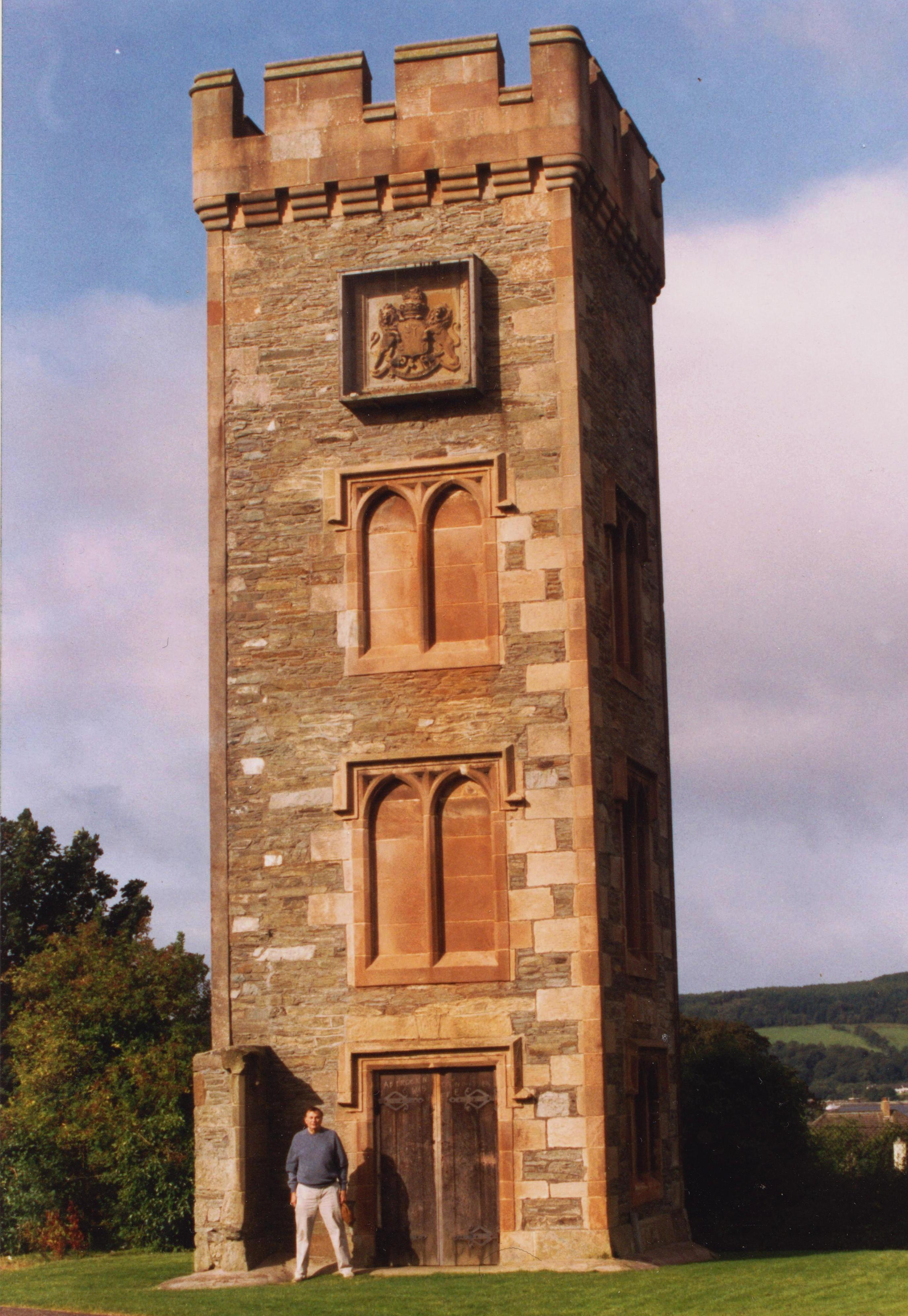
Ardencaple Castle, located near Helensburgh, Scotland. Today, all that remains of the grand turreted mansion is a solitary tower.

In 2001, an ad hoc derbhfine took place at Tulloch Castle, Dingwall in Easter Ross with the intention of nominating a person to petition Lyon Court to become a recognised clan chief. Prior to the derbhfine Ross Herald wrote to six armigers and ten landowners supplied by the Clan MacAulay Association, who would be involved in the voting. The derbhfine, which was supervised by Ross Herald, took place in front of 50 clan members, and the voting was carried out by only 11 members. The derbhfine ruled that Iain McMillan MacAulay, then an 80-year-old armiger, should lead the clan. After being nominated as leader, MacAulay then petitioned the Lord Lyon King of Arms for the right to receive the undifferenced arms of the last chief of Clan MacAulay, legally making him clan chief. Later in 2002, the Robin Blair, the Lord Lyon King of Arms rejected MacAulay's petition. He ruled that a petitioner without a genealogical link to a past chief would have to rule as Commander of the Clan for ten years before being considered for recognition as a chief. Following this, The Scotsman reported that the reasoning behind his ruling was that recognising MacAulay as chief would discourage any further research into finding a blood link to the chiefs of the clan. And that such research was unnecessary. The Lord Lyon also stated, that with no historical evidence linking the Macaulays of Lewis and Clan MacAulay (the MacAulays of Ardincaple), "there does not seem to be any firm basis for considering the present Petition other than in the context of the Ardincaple MacAulays alone." Later in 2002, clan members then decided on a democratic process to select a clan chief. It was decided that a potential chief would have to be elected by all clan members for a duration of five years at a time, before being re-elected again. At the time it was also debated over whether a potential chief should have to be a resident in Scotland, however a decision on this could not be agreed upon. Following Iain McMillan MacAulay's death in 2003 his son, Diarmid Iain MacAulay, was elected by members as chief.

According to the website of the "Clan MacAulay Association in Scotland", there was a "clan gathering" held in Edinburgh during the Homecoming Scotland 2009 festivities, which took place from 25–26 July 2009. On 7 August 2011, the Clan MacAulay Association elected Hector MacAulay as "Chief of the Clan MacAulay Association", at the association's AGM. A "Clan MacAulay International Gathering" took place in August 2011, in Carnlough, County Antrim, Northern Ireland. The event was the first such gathering outwith Scotland.

The Cln Gathering in Crieff was held in 2013. There was then an International Clan Gathering of the Clan MacAulay in Oban in 2015. The Clan Gathering of 2017 took place again in County Antrim, Northern Ireland and was attend by nearly 200 from throughout the world. The next Clan Gathering will take place in Aviemore, Scotland from 5 to 8 September 2019. See the clan website for details - www.clanmacaulay.org.uk

== Unrelated Irish MacAuleys ==
Locations of the three unrelated Irish septs.

Today some of the McAuleys (and other various spellings of the name) living in Northern Ireland and the Republic of Ireland descend from Clan MacAulay (of Ardincaple). However, there are several different clans or septs of native Irish which bear exactly the same and similar names that are unrelated and have no connection at all with Clan MacAulay (of Ardincaple).

The Mac Amhalghaidh sept originating from lands in County Offaly and County Westmeath derive its name from the Old Irish name Amhalgaidh (just as Clan MacAulay). The sept is considered to be of native Irish origin, descending from Niall of the Nine Hostages. The chiefs of the sept are recorded in the Irish annals as "chiefs of Calry"; their lands were known in Elizabethan times as "MacGawleys Country".

The Mac Amhlaoibh sept from County Fermanagh in Ulster derive its name from Amhlaoibh, a Gaelic personal name derived from the Old Norse names Áleifr and Óláfr. The sept traces its descent from Amlaíb (d.1306), younger son of the first Maguire king of Fermanagh—Donn Óc (c.1286–1302). The family was one of the junior septs that dispossessed other non-Maguire families in the area of the Maguire lordship. In consequence of their military actions the family left its mark on the area in the name of the barony of Clanawley in County Fermanagh.

The Mac Amhlaoibh sept of County Cork are a branch of the MacCarthys. Today many members of the sept bear names like MacAuliffe which is usually found within County Cork and hardly ever found outside of Munster. The chiefs of the sept resided at Castle MacAuliffe which was located near Newmarket, County Cork. The territory of the sept was described in 1612 as "Clan Auliffe".

The "MacAuleys of the Glens" are thought to be of Scottish descent. Located in the Glens of Antrim, the MacAuleys were allies of the MacDonnells in the 16th century. The MacDonnells held parts of Clannaboy while the MacAuleys, MacGills, and MacAllisters occupied the northeast coast of Antrim. On the plain of Bun-na-mairgie, near Ballycastle, the MacDonnells (led by Sorley Boy MacDonnell) fought the MacQuillans. Before the battle, the MacQuillans appealed to the O'Neills of Lower Claneboy and to the MacAuleys and MacPhoils of the middle Glens of Antrim for assistance against the MacDonnells. The two small clans (the MacAuleys and MacPhoils) were two days late to the battle; when they arrived, they were only spectators to a battle which was near its climax. Sorley Boy MacDonnell then rode out to the chief of the MacAuleys and persuaded him to join his ranks, as did the MacPhoils. Their combined force then drove the MacQuillans to the banks of the river Aura, where they were finally defeated and the chief of the MacQuillans slain in what is known as the Battle of Aura. Festivities lasted for several days after the battle and a cairn, called "Coslin Sorley Boy", was raised on the mountain Trostan.

== Clan profile ==
- Etymology of the name: The clan has been thought by some people to descend from the family of the earls of Lennox. Within the family, the personal name Amhlaibh was given to several individuals. In the mid 20th century, George Fraser Black stated that the clan's surname MacAulay (and its numerous variations) originated from the Gaelic patronymic name Mac Amhalghaidh (meaning "son of Amalghaidh / Amhalghadh"). The Old Gaelic personal name Amalghaidh / Amhalghadh, pronounced almost like "Aulay" or "Owley", is of uncertain meaning.
- Clan member's crest badge: In most cases, crest badges are made up of a clan chief's heraldic crest and heraldic motto. However, in the case of Clan MacAulay, no coat of arms of a chief of the clan has ever been matriculated by the Lord Lyon King of Arms, the head of the heraldic authority in Scotland. The crest badge appropriate for a clan member contains the crest: a boot couped at the ankle and theron a spur proper; and the motto: dulce periculum (translation from Latin: "danger is sweet"). In 1608, Sir Aulay MacAulay of Ardincaple was a Shire Commissioner for Dunbartonshire (prior to the Acts of Union 1707, a Shire Commissioner was the equivalent of the English office of Member of Parliament). Sir Aulay was one of two commissioners who were tasked with regulating the price of boots and shoes.
- Clan badge: There have been two clan badges (or plant badges) attributed to Clan MacAulay: cranberry and scots pine. Both clans MacAulay and MacFarlane have been attributed with a badge of cranberry. Clan MacFarlane, also a west-Dunbartonshire clan, claims a descent from Alwyn II, Earl of Lennox. The badge of scots pine has been attributed to all seven clans of Siol Alpin: Clan Grant, Clan Gregor, Clan MacAulay, Clan Macfie, Clan Mackinnon, Clan Macnab, and Clan MacQuarrie.

=== Heraldry ===
No coat of arms of a chief of the clan has ever been matriculated by the Lord Lyon King of Arms. Even so, in the 19th century, several heraldists listed different arms for the MacAulays of Ardincaple. The 19th century Ulster King of Arms, Sir John Bernard Burke listed the (undated) arms of "Macaulay (Ardincaple, co. Argyll)", blazoned: gules two arrows in saltire argent surmounted of a fess chequy of the second and first between three buckles Or. The 19th century heraldist Robert Riddle Stodart published an undated facsimile of a different coat of arms of "Mc: aula of Arncapelle" (which is also pictured above within the article). The seal of Aulay Macaulay of Ardincaple, in 1593 bore: a fess chequy and in chief a buckle. An early grant of arms, to a member of the clan and descendant of the MacAulays of Ardincaple, was that of George M'Alla, merchant of Edinburgh. His coat of arms was registered by Lyon Court in 1672 and is blazoned: gules, two arrows in saltire argent surmounted of a fess checquy of the second and first between three buckles or, a bordure indented of the last; crest: a boot couped at the ankle thereon a spur all proper; motto: dulce periculum. The celebrated 19th-century historian Thomas Babington Macaulay, 1st Baron Macaulay was granted (English) arms that alluded to those of the MacAulays of Ardincaple. This was despite his having no connection at all with Clan MacAulay; he was descended from the unrelated Macaulays of Lewis.

MacAulay heraldry

The heraldic elements within the seal of Aulay MacAulay of Ardincaple, 1593

MacAulay of Ardincaple
(per Stodart, undated, not registered at Lyon Court)

MacAulay of Ardincaple
(per Burke, undated, not registered at Lyon Court)

George M'Alla
(reg. at Lyon Court, 1672)

Thomas Babington Macaulay, 1st Baron Macaulay
(not registered at Lyon Court)

According to Stodart, the fess checquy and buckles, prominent in 'MacAulay heraldry', are derived from the arms of the Stewarts. The basic Stewart coat of arms is blazoned: Or, a fess chequy azure and argent. The buckles used in 'Stewart heraldry' are ultimately derived from the canting arms of Alexander Boncle (d. by 1300), blazoned: gules, three buckles Or. Boncle's daughter (who in time became his heiress) married Sir John Stewart (d. 1298), younger son of Alexander Stewart, 4th High Steward of Scotland. (Note: Sir John Stewart was killed at the Battle of Falkirk, leading the archers of the Forest.) Together the couple founded the 'Bonkyl' Stewart branch of the clan, and their descendants tended to use the 'Bonkyl' buckles as their heraldic differencing. One of the couple's sons, Sir Allan Stewart of Dreghorn (d. 1333), founded the Stewart of Darnley branch of the clan, which in time became the earls and dukes of Lennox.

Non-MacAulay heraldry

Basic undifferenced arms of Stewart

Alexander Boncle
(c. 1300, Lord Marshal's Roll)

=== Tartan ===
There have been several published tartans associated with the surname MacAulay.

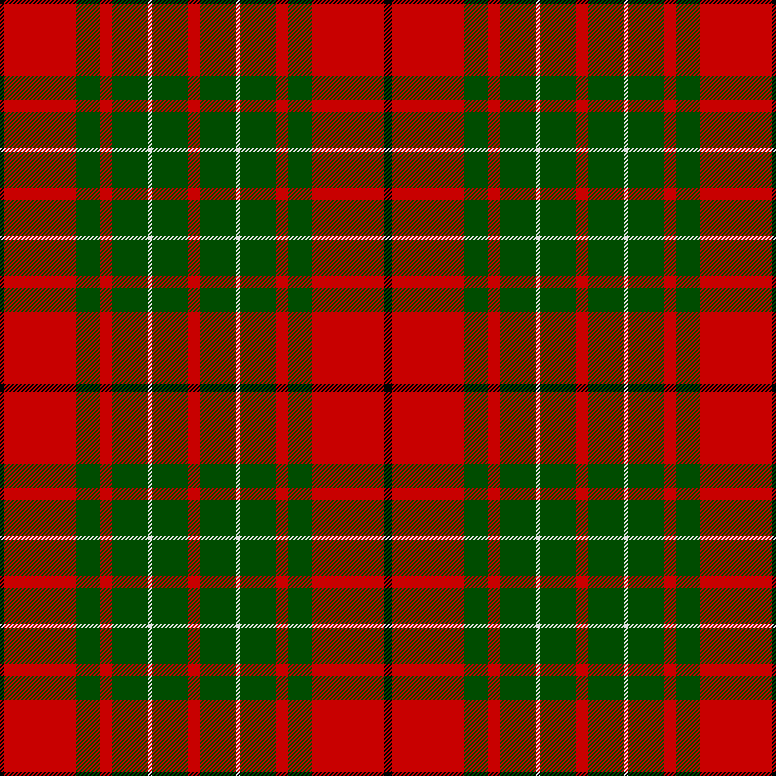

MacAulay or Comyn/Cumming: this tartan was first published by James Logan as a MacAulay tartan and was illustrated in his joint work with R. R. McIan The Clans of the Scottish Highlands, in 1845. An almost identical tartan, listed as a "Cymyne" (Comyn/Cumming) tartan, appeared in the 1842 work Vestiarium Scoticum, by the infamous Sobieski Stuarts. In the 1850 work of W. and K. Smith, it is listed as Cumming tartan; the Smiths claimed the tartan had the sanction of the head family of Cumming.

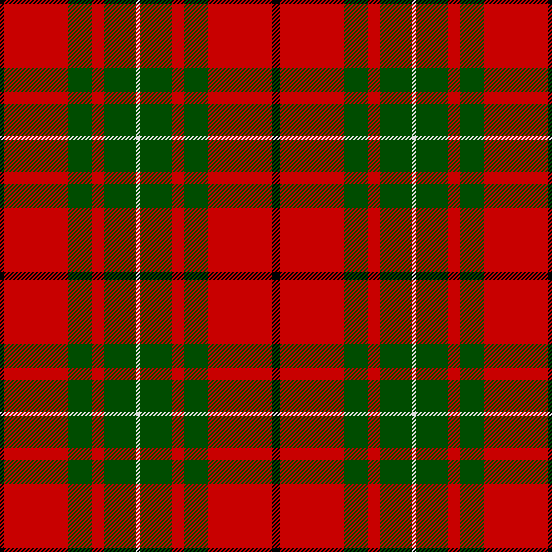

MacAulay: This is a shortened version of the tartan published by Logan (above) and is first found in the 1881 work by M'Intyre North, who had copied (possibly erroneously) Logan's thread counts. The tartan then appears in James Grant's work of 1886, with Logan's original MacAulay tartan being listed again as a Comyn/Cumming. According to tartan scholar Donald Calder Stewart, there are several possibilities as to how the shortened version came to be: a copyist's error could have left out four lines from Logan's count to produce this version, or manufacturers seeing Logan's design listed as a Cumming in the Smith work may have made the change to eliminate confusion. This shortened version looks similar to the MacGregor tartan, with whom the MacAulays have been associated. The tartan also appears in the Clans Originaux, which dates from 1880. Frank Adam and Thomas Innes of Learney, writing in the first half of the 20th century, claimed that this is the tartan of the MacAulays of Ardincaple and that the Macaulays of Lewis then wore the Macleod tartan.

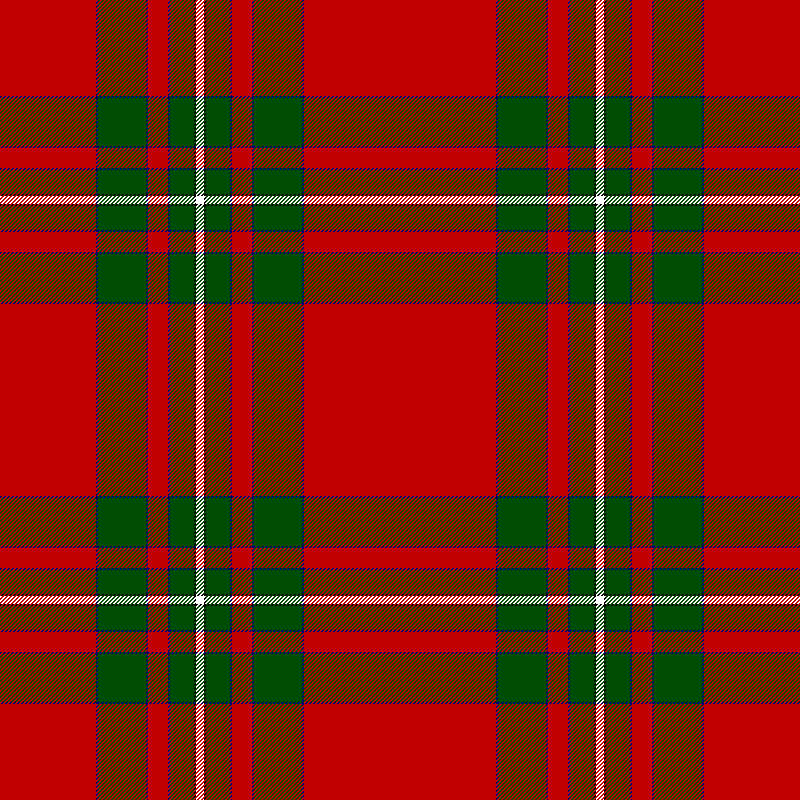

MacAulay: This tartan shows a definite similarity to the MacGregor tartan. It was first published in the David MacGregor Peter's The Baronage of Angus and Mearns in 1856; where it is described as: "12 red, 1/4 blue, 6 green, 1/4 blue, 2 1/2 red, 1/4 blue, 3 green, 1/4 black, 1 white, 1/4 black, 3 green, 1/4 blue, 2 1/4 red, 1/4 blue, 6 green, 1/4 blue, 24 red."

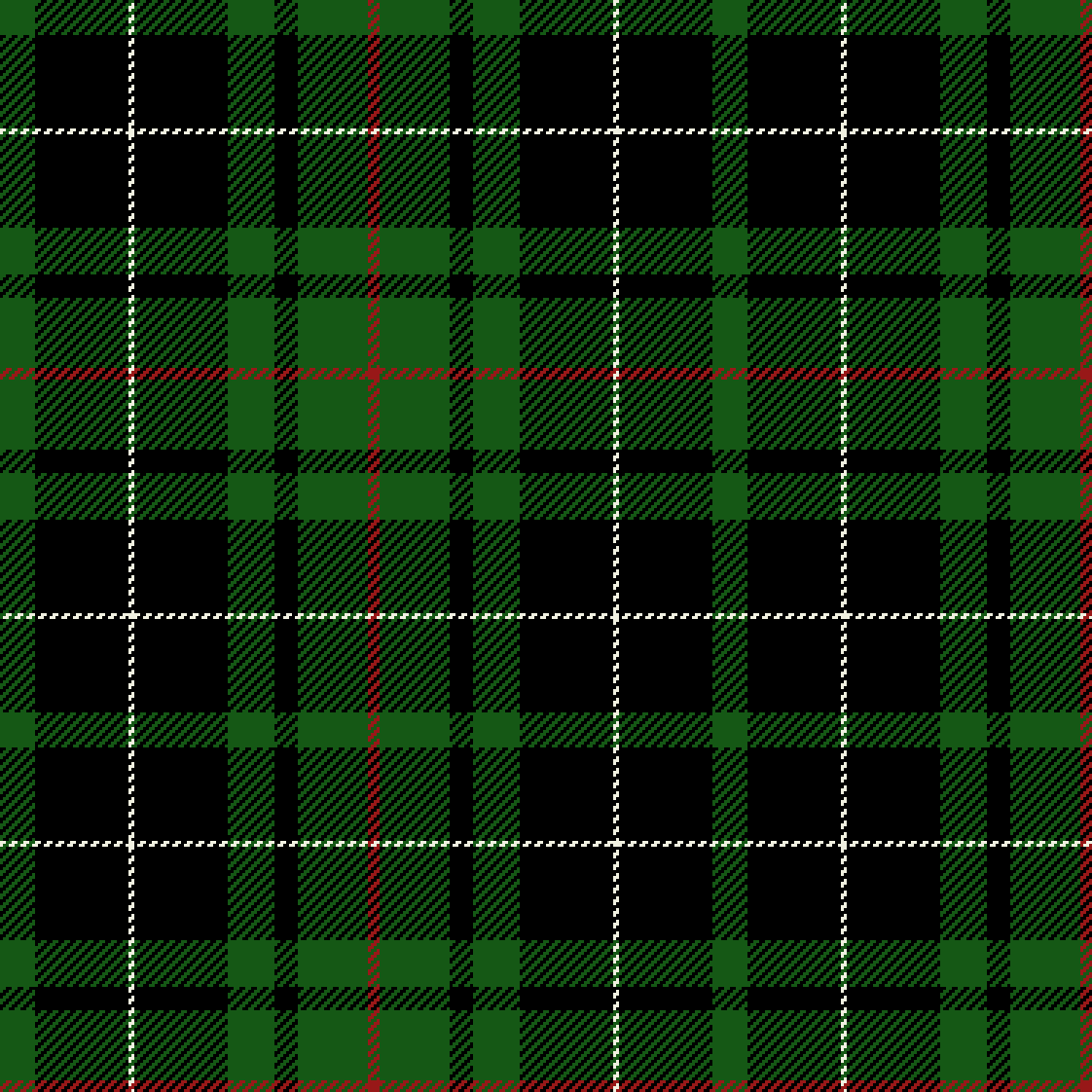

Hunting MacAulay: Tartan scholar Donald Calder Stewart described this as a "modern tartan" and that it conforms to the early MacAulay tartan recorded by Logan (top left). The Scottish Register of Tartans states that this tartan dates from 1850.

=== Associated families ===
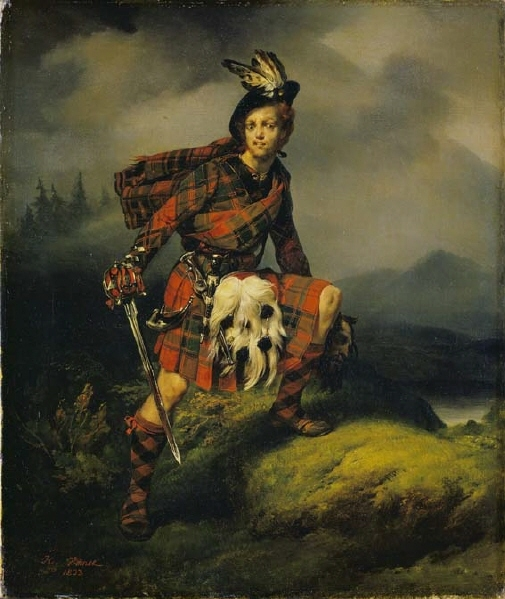
Allan M'Aulay, by Horace Vernet, 1823. M'Aulay holds the severed head of Hector MacEagh, one of the "children of the mist".

One of the 'official' Clan Campbell septs is MacPhedran—a name derived from MacPheaderain, meaning "son of little Peader". The Gaelic Peadar is a cognate of the English Peter; and both are forms of the Greek Petros, meaning "stone", "rock". William Buchanan of Auchmar's 18th-century account of the surname MacAulay states that the original member of this sept was a MacAulay. This sept dwelt in the lands of Sonachan, on Loch Awe, in what is largely Clan Campbell territory. The earliest account of the sept is in 1439, when Domenicus M'Federan was granted confirmation for the lands of Sonachan by Sir Duncan Campbell of Lochawe. According to David Sellar, the MacArthurs of Darleith descend from the MacAulays of Ardincaple. Darleith is located quite close to the old MacAulay seat at Ardincaple, about 8 kilometres (5.0 mi).

=== In popular culture ===
A fictional "M'Aulay" clan appeared in Walter Scott's 1819 novel, A Legend of Montrose, which was set during the James Graham, 5th Earl of Montrose's Highland campaign against the Covenanters in 1644. One of the main characters within the novel is Allan M'Aulay, a member of Montrose's army, and the younger brother to Angus, the clan's chief. Within the novel, Allan M'Aulay feuds with the MacEaghs, who are also known as the "children of the mist". Historically, the term "children of the mist" referred to the line of MacGregors who were disinherited in the 16th century. The character of Allan M'Aulay was based upon the historical James Stewart of Ardvorlich, sometimes called the "Mad Major".

== See also ==
- Ardencaple Castle, once the seat of the chiefs of Clan MacAulay
- Siol Alpin, the seven clans which were once thought to have a common descent from Alpin, father of Kenneth MacAlpin
- Macaulay of Lewis, the clan of Macaulays on the Isle of Lewis who have no relation with Clan MacAulay
