= Shandon Castle =

Shandon Castle may refer to:

- Shandon Castle, Cork, Ireland
- Shandon Castle, Argyll and Bute, Scotland
