= Ardencaple =

Ardencaple may refer to:

- Ardencaple Castle, a lighthouse and former castle in Argyll and Bute, Scotland.
- Ardencaple Farm, a settlement in Kenya's Eastern Province.
