= Siol Alpin =

Family of seven Scottish clans

Lineage of the seven clans of Siol Alpin.

Siol Alpin (from Gaelic, Sìol Ailpein: Seed of Alpin) is a family of seven Scottish clans traditionally claiming descent from Alpin, father of Cináed mac Ailpín, King of the Picts, of whom the Scots tradition considered the first King of Scots. The seven clans that make up Siol Alpin are: Clan Grant, Clan Gregor, Clan MacAulay, Clan Macfie, Clan Mackinnon, Clan Macnab, and Clan MacQuarrie.

== Historical examples of a Siol Alpin tradition ==
There are several historical examples that show the strength of the Siol Alpin tradition.

=== Clan Gregor and Clan Grant ===
The Siol Alpin tradition was so strong in the clans Gregor and Grant that in the early part of the eighteenth century the two clans met at Blair Atholl to discuss re-uniting them. In the discussions, which lasted fourteen days, it was agreed that if the proscription against the surname MacGregor could be reversed then the new clan would take that name, otherwise MacAlpin of Grant would then be used. On the issue of the chiefship of the combined clan there was disagreement, and discussions eventually broke down. Though several Grants, including the Laird of Ballindalloch, "showed their loyalty to the ancient kinship by adding the MacGregor patronymic to their name".

=== Clan Gregor and Clan MacAulay ===
On 27 May 1591 Aulay MacAulay of Ardincaple and Alasdair MacGregor of Glenstrae entered into a bond of manrent. In the bond the two chiefs promised to aid each other against anyone but the King. Also, Ardincaple acknowledged being a cadet of the House of MacGregor, and promised to pay the MacGregor chief his calp. (A calp was a tribute of cattle or the best eighth of a part of goods. The payment of the calp was a significant custom in Gaelic society; giving one's best animal to the person acknowledged as his Chief). A passage from the bond runs: "Alexander M'Gregor of Glenstray on the ane part and Awly M'Cawley of Ardingapill on the other part understanding ourselfs and our name to be M'Calppins of auld and to be our just and trew surname". From this statement Skene concluded that there was no doubt that the MacAulays claimed descent from Siol Alpin.

=== Clan MacKinnon and Clan MacNab ===
On 12 July 1606 Lauchlan MacKinnon of Strathairdle and Finlay Macnab of Bowaine, entered into a bond of friendship. In the bond the two chiefs claimed to "come from one house and one lineage", promising to lend aid to each other. This bond was seen as further proof, by Skene, that the MacKinnons were descended from Siol Alpin.

=== Clan Gregor and Clan MacKinnon ===
Another bond involving the MacKinnons, this time between the MacKinnons and MacGregors, has also been seen as proof on a Siol Alpin descent. In 1671, in Kilmorie, Lauchlan MacKinnon of Strahairdle and James Macgregor of Macgregor, entered into the bond, stating that the two chiefs descended "fra twa breethren of auld descent".

=== Clan Grant and Clan Mackinnon ===
Following the failed Jacobite rising of 1715, Iain Dubh, chief of Clan MacKinnon, lost his lands under the Act of Attainder. His forfeited lands were then bought from the Government by the chief of Clan Grant and then handed over to Iain Dubh's heirs. The author, Charles MacKinnon, claims that there can be no reason that a chief, so far removed from the Isle of Skye, bought another clan's lands and then gave them back - other than a belief in common ancestry. And that the two clans belonged to the same family, Siol Alpin.

== Heraldic examples of the Siol Alpin tradition ==
The belief in their Alpinian descent is shown in the clan badges (sometimes known as plant badges) of the seven clans. Clan badges were worn in the bonnets of highlanders to distinguish friend from foe, and all seven clans share Scots Pine as their clan badge. In addition to the clan badges, the mottoes used within the crest badges of several of the clans allude to the Siol Alpin tradition. For instance, Clan Gregor: 'S Rioghal Mo Dhream (translation from Gaelic: "Royal is My Race"); Clan Macfie: Pro Rege (translation from Latin: "For the King"). While the slogan of Clan MacKinnon is Cuimhnich bas Alpein (translation from Gaelic: "Remember the death of Alpin").
