= Aulay MacAulay of Ardincaple =

Scottish laird, knight and clan chief

Sir Aulay MacAulay of Ardincaple
- The heraldic elements within the seal of Aulay MacAulay of Ardincaple, 1593
- Born: 16th century
- Died: December 1617
- Known for: Chief of Clan MacAulay
- Title: Laird of Ardincaple
- Successor: Alexander MacAulay of Ardincaple (a first cousin)
- Spouses: 1. Joanna Cunningham; 2. Margaret Crawford
- Children: no children
- Parent(s): Walter MacAulay of Ardincaple; Margaret Drummond

Sir Aulay MacAulay of Ardincaple (died 1617) was a Scottish laird, knight, clan chief, and a shire commissioner. He was the son and heir of Walter MacAulay Ardincaple, who was the laird of Ardincaple and chief of Clan MacAulay. The MacAulay estate of Ardincaple was situated in the location of the modern village of Rhu and Helensburgh, which both lie on the eastern shore of the Gare Loch, in Argyll and Bute. As chief of his clan, he entered into a contract with the chief of the MacGregors, pledging service and assistance to their chief. His clan feuded with the Buchanans, and his marriage to the widow of a deceased Galbraith chief brought forth feuding with that clan. He also feuded with the Campbells, particularly the Captain of Carrick. The Campbells made several attempts on his life and he was wounded one such encounter. Towards the end of his life he was knighted for his services. On his death he was succeeded by his first cousin.

== Personal ==
Aulay MacAulay was born in the 16th century; the son and heir of Walter MacAulay, laird of Ardincaple, and chief of Clan MacAulay. According to the 19th-century historian Joseph Irving, Walter and his elder half-brother, Alexander, were likely the first of the clan to take the surname MacAulay. Aulay MacAulay's mother—the wife of Walter MacAulay of Ardincaple—was Margaret Drummond, eldest daughter of Alexander Drummond of Carnock. Aulay MacAulay of Ardincaple was married twice. His first wife was Joanna Cunningham, daughter of Cuthbert Cunningham of Corsehill. He later married Margaret Crawford, sometime before 24 April 1592, who was from the family of the Crawfords of Kilbirnie. Margaret Crawford was also the widow (and cousin) of James Galbraith of Culcreuch, 16th chief of Clan Galbraith. Ardincaple's marriage caused tension between him and his new son-in-law—Robert Galbraith of Culcreuch, 17th chief of Clan Galbraith.

== Chief of Clan MacAulay ==
After the death of his father, Ardincaple became chief of Clan MacAulay. The clan was centred at Ardincaple Castle—which according to Irving, was erected by Aulay's father. The Ardincaple estate was located in what is today the village of Rhu, and town of Helensburgh, in Argyll and Bute. The area was within the Lennox district, which was then controlled by the dukes of Lennox. In the Roll of Landlords and Baillies of 1587, Ardincaple was listed as one of the principal vassals of the Duke of Lennox. (Note: He appears listed as "The Laird MacCawla of Ardincaple".)

Approximation of the lands possessed by some of the clan chiefs within the Lennox, in the 16th century (clans Buchanan, Campbell, Colquhoun, MacAulay, MacFarlane, and Gregor).

=== Bond of manrent with the chief of Clan Gregor ===
In the 15th and 16th centuries, the 'native' clans of the Lennox—the MacAulays, MacFarlanes, and Colquhouns—raided and plundered each other's lands and combined to sweep the lowlands of its flocks and herds. However, around this time period other clans entered the district—among them were the MacGregors, Campbells, Camerons and Buchanans.

On 27 May 1591, Ardincaple and Alexander MacGregor of Glenstrae, chief of Clan Gregor, signed a bond of manrent. In the bond, Ardincaple acknowledged Glenstrae as his chief and of being a cadet of the House of MacGregor, and therefore promised to pay the MacGregor chief his calp. The giving of calp—a tribute of cattle or the best eighth of a part of goods to a superior lord or chief—was a significant custom in Gaelic society. According to historian Ronald Williams, the contract between Ardincaple and Glenstrae gave the MacGregors some temporary relief from the Buchanans and Galbraiths. Also, at around this period in time, the MacAulays were feuding with the Buchanans. According to Irving, prior to this contract, Ardincaple did not appear to have been involved with Clan Gregor in any way. Irving went on to state that even though the Ardincaple was at feud with the Buchanans, it is unclear how such an alliance would benefit his own clan. Irving wrote that Ardincaple must have known that any connection with Clan Gregor "would end (as it actually did) in a manner most disastrous to all connected with the turbulent Macgregors".

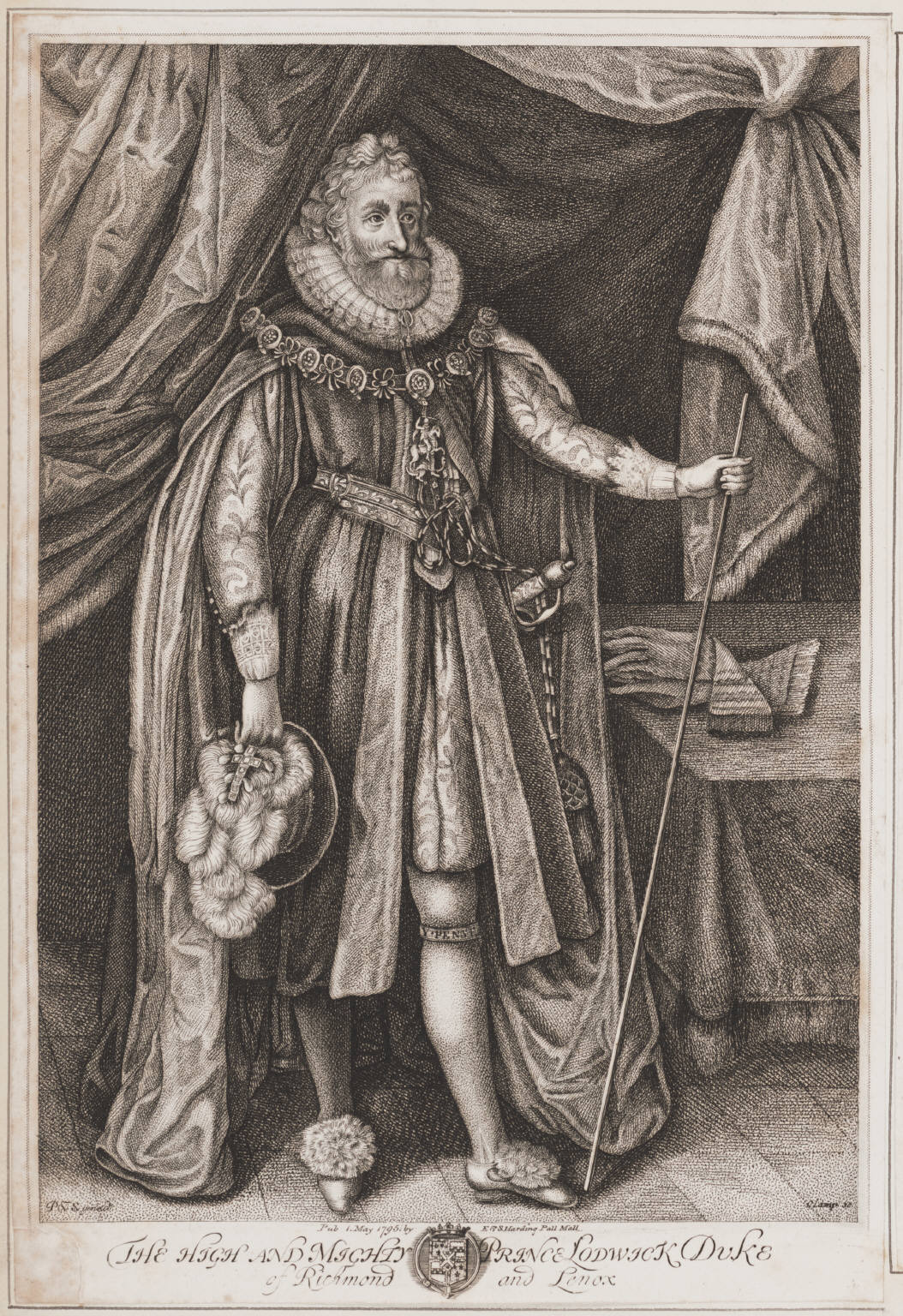
The influence of Ludovic Stewart, 2nd Duke of Lennox saved Ardincaple from his enemies, numerous times.

=== Feuding with Galbraith of Culcreuch ===
In 1593, Robert Galbraith of Culcreuch was given a Commission of Justiciary to pursue the outlawed Clan Gregor. The MacAulays and Colquhouns were, however, suspicious of Culcreuch's real intentions. On 3 May 1593, the chiefs of the two clans complained to the Privy Council that Culcreuch had only purchased the commission under counsel from George Buchanan, and that Culcreuch had no intention of harassing the MacGregors. The MacAulays and Colquhouns feared that it was much more likely that the Galbraiths, allied with the Buchanans, would direct their vengeance against themselves under the guise of hunting and clearing Clan Gregor from the Lennox. Due to the influence of the Ardincaple's superior, Ludovic Stewart, 2nd Duke of Lennox, the letters of Fire and Sword were taken from the Galbraiths and Buchanans. According to Williams, Ardincaple had been sparing of the entire truth, for no mention was made of the bond of manrent between himself and the now outlawed Clan Gregor chief. Williams was of the opinion that it was unlikely that the Privy Council was aware of such an agreement between the two chiefs. Even so, the Privy Council demanded securities of Ardincaple to insure that he not assist Clan Gregor.

=== Feuding with the Campbells ===
Archibald Campbell, 7th Earl of Argyll pursued a violent feud with Ardincaple during the late 16th and early 17th century. Argyll's lieutenants in the area were Duncan Campbell, Captain of Carrick and Neil Campbell of Lochgoilhead, who led raids into Ardincaple's lands attempting to slay the MacAulay chief. The Campbells of Carrick were seated at Carrick Castle on the shores of Loch Goil (about 15 kilometres (9.3 mi) northwest of Ardincaple). In 1598, Carrick registered a bond of 300 merks for each of his men in Rosneath to keep from harming Ardincaple. At the same time, Robert Sempill of Foulwood registered a bond of 2,000 merks for Carrick not to harm Ardincaple and his followers. The following year, the Duke of Lennox legally evicted Donald Campbell of Drongie and several of his followers from the lands of Mamoir, Mambeg, and Forlancarry along the banks of the Gare Loch. The Campbells of Drongie were close supporters of the Campbells of Carrick, and in retaliation a combined force of Campbells of Carrick and Drongie assembled at Rosneath (on opposite shore of the Gare Loch from Ardincaple Castle) and laid waste to the duke's new acquisitions. When the case was presented to the Privy Council on 17 May 1600, both Campbell of Carrick and Campbell of Drongie were denounced as rebels.

On 25 November 1600, evidence was brought forth to the Privy Council of an attempt on Ardincaple's life on 24 September 1600. The evidence pointed to Carrick's men coming at night to Ardincaple and attacking followers of the laird and killing one—Malcolm Galbraith. A second attempt on Ardincaple's life was carried out at night as he was staying at Nether Greenock. On this occasion, Ardincaple, Patrick Dennestoun (one of Ardincaple's servants), and Archibald Connel were all shot in the encounter. Again the Privy Council denounced Carrick and his men as rebels. At the end of November 1600, Carrick and 100 followers invaded the lands of Ardincaple armed with "hagbuts, pistolets, bows, darlochs and habershons". The force hid in the woods of Ardincaple for one night, taking several prisoners before fleeing. In the morning, a rider making towards the house of Ardincaple was presumed to be Ardincaple himself and nearly killed, before he was identified as a Campbell (servitor to the Earl of Argyll). Carrick's force, for fear of being pursued by men of the district, left the area after destroying houses, hamstringing animals, and making off with livestock belonging to other tenants of the duke. In the process the Carrick men "spuilyeit the houssis of John Dow McAula in Garelocheid and Patrik McCaula in Aldonit". For their actions, the participating Campbells were again denounced as rebels.

=== Suspicions of aiding Clan Gregor ===
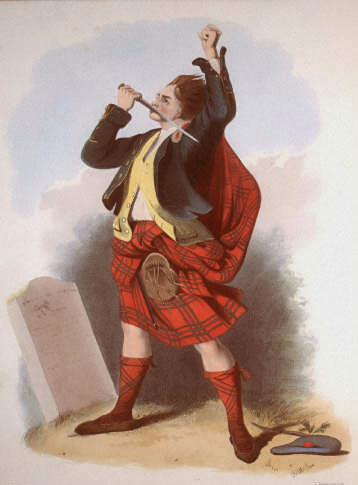
R. R. McIan's Victorian era romanticised depiction of a Clan Gregor clansman swearing an oath of vengeance against the Campbells.

Following the Battle of Glen Fruin, between Clan Gregor and Clan Colquhoun in February 1603, there was much public outcry against the rebellious MacGregors. By an Act of the Privy Council, on 3 April 1603, it was made an offence to bear the name MacGregor, or to give add and shelter to one. The Earl of Argyll, who was responsible to the Privy Council for the actions of the MacGregors, was entrusted to bring the force of the law against this lawless clan. Being deeply suspicious of Ardincaple's dealings with Glenstrae, one of Argyll's first moves was to bring acts against Ardincaple.

On 17 March 1603, John Stewart of Ardmaleish, Sheriff of Bute, became surety for Ardincaple; that he would appear in Edinburgh, on 17 May 1603, and answer to the charges of aiding, supplying, and inter-communing with Alasdair MacGregor of Glenstrae and other MacGregors. Ardincaple was also to answer for not "rising ye fray" and pursuing the outlawed clan in the Lennox. Ardincaple was accused of bringing the MacGregor "thevis and rebells" to the Colquhoun lands of Luss and for their part in stealing from the Colquhouns of Luss. Again the influence of the Duke of Lennox saved Ardincaple and his clan from the same fate as Glenstrae and his. On 7 April 1603, James VI wrote from Berwick to the Justice General and his deputies, declaring Ardincaple to be innocent of the alleged crimes and that he was to accompany the king to England with the Duke of Lennox. (Note: The king's letter states: "... And We, vnderstanding that the said Aulay M^{c}cauley is altogidder frie and innocent of the saidis allegit crymes laid to his chairge; and that he is to accumpany ws to our realme of Ingland, with our darrest cousing the Duik of Lennox, his maister ...". An approximate translation into modern English: "... And we, understanding that the said Aulay MacAulay is altogether free and innocent of the said alleged crimes laid to his charge; and that he is to accompany us to our realm of England, with our dearest cousin the Duke of Lennox, his master ...".) By the time the king's letter was received, Ardincaple had already left the Lennox district as part of the Duke of Lennox's train, which accompanied James VI on his way to England to be declared King James I of England.

The outlawed Glenstrae was finally apprehended by Argyll on 18 January 1604 after almost a year in hiding. and brought to Edinburgh to stand trial. The illiterate Glenstrae consented to give a preliminary statement which was titled a 'confession' and which convicted him out of his own mouth. Within his 'confession', Glenstrae accused Argyll of trying to persuade him to kill Ardincaple: "I Confess, before God, that he did all his craftie diligence to intyse me to slay and destroy the Laird Ardinkaippill, M^{c}kallay, for ony ganes kyndness or freindschip that he mycht do or gif me. The quhilk I did refuis, in respect of my faithfull promeis maid to M^{c}kallay of befor". (Note: Approximate translation into modern English: "I confess, before God, that he did all his crafty diligence to entice me to slay and destroy the Laird of Ardincaple, MacAulay, for any gain of kindness or friendship that he might do or give me. That which i did refuse, in respect of my fateful promise made to MacAulay before".) Glenstrae and several of his leading men were then executed.

Despite Ardincaple's pledge of allegiance to Glenstrae in 1591, Irving noted that once Clan Gregor was outlawed Ardincaple turned against the clan, making "himself conspicuous by the energy with which he turned against them". The 19th-century historian William Anderson stated that Ardincaple probably intended to avert suspicions upon himself, for his prior dealings with the clan.

=== Later life ===
The crest badge worn by members of Clan MacAulay bears a boot couped at the ankle and theron a spur proper.

In 1597, Ardincaple was suretor to Lachlan Maclean of Coll who had to give up Breachacha Castle when required by the king. (Note: "... and 1597, Aula McCawlay becomes surety for Lauchlane McClayne of Coill to give up the house of Brekoch when required by the king".) He was knighted before 1610. In 1608 he served as Commissioner for Dumbartonshire (as a minor baron). (Note: A Shire Commissioner was the equivalent of the English office of Member of Parliament.) He was one of two commissioners who were tasked with regulating the price of boots and shoes. When in 1614, Angus Og MacDonald of Dunyvaig had seized Dunyvaig Castle—which had been held by the Bishop of the Isles—Sir Aulay MacAulay of Ardincaple, with twenty of his men, accompanied the bishop to Islay to demand the surrender of the castle. Sir Aulay MacAulay of Ardincaple died in December 1617. He left no issue by either of his two wives. He was succeeded by his first cousin, Alexander MacAulay of Durling (son of Aulay MacAulay of Durling, Sir Aulay's uncle).

== Personal heraldry ==
No coat of arms of a MacAulay chief has ever been matriculated by the Lord Lyon King of Arms, the head of the heraldic authority in Scotland. Aulay Macaulay of Ardincaple's seal, in 1593, is blazoned: a fess chequy and in chief a buckle. These elements are also used in the heraldry of 'MacAulays' to this day. According to the 19th century heraldist Robert Riddle Stodart, these elements are ultimately derived from the heraldry of the Stewarts.

== Ancestors ==
Ancestors of Sir Aulay MacAulay of Ardincaple
Sir Aulay MacAulay of Ardincaple	Father; Walter MacAulay of Ardincaple	Paternal Grandfather: Aulay de Ardincaple
Sir Aulay MacAulay of Ardincaple	Father; Walter MacAulay of Ardincaple	Paternal Grandmother: Elizabeth Knox
Sir Aulay MacAulay of Ardincaple	Mother: Margaret Drummond	Maternal Grandfather: Alexander Drummond of Carnock
Sir Aulay MacAulay of Ardincaple	Mother: Margaret Drummond	Maternal Grandmother: Marjorie Bruce (daughter of Bruce of Auchinbowie)

== See also ==
- Clan MacAulay, his clan

== Sources ==
- Adam, Frank; Innes of Learney, Thomas (1970). The Clans, Septs & Regiments of the Scottish Highlands (8th ed.). Edinburgh: Johnston and Bacon. ISBN 0-7179-4500-6.
- Anderson, William (1878). The Scottish Nation. Vol. 2. London: Fullarton & Co. ISBN 0-7884-0310-9.
- Campbell of Airds, Alastair (2002). A History of Clan Campbell: Volume 2: From Flodden to the Restoration. Edinburgh: Edinburgh University Press. ISBN 1-902930-18-5.
- Dewar, Peter Beauclerk, ed. (2001). Burke's landed gentry of Great Britain (19th, illustrated ed.). Burke's Peerage & Gentry. ISBN 978-0-9711966-0-5.
- Ewart, Gordon; Baker, Fiona; et al. (1998). "Carrick Castle: symbol and source of Campbell power in south Argyll from the 14th to the 17th century" (PDF). Proceedings of the Society of Antiquaries of Scotland. 128: 937–1016. doi:10.9750/PSAS.128.937.1016. S2CID 221292650. Archived from the original (PDF) on 11 June 2007.
- Foster, Joseph (1882). Members of Parliament, Scotland, including the minor barons, the commissioners for the shires, and the commissioners for the burghs, 1357-1882 (2nd, revised and corrected ed.). London.
- Fraser, William (1869). The Chiefs of Colquhoun and their Country. Vol. 1. Edinburgh: T. & A. Constable.
- Fraser, William (1869). The Chiefs of Colquhoun and their Country. Vol. 2. Edinburgh: T. & A. Constable.
- Gregory, Donald (1881). History Of The Western Highlands And Isles Of Scotland, From A.D. 1493 To A.D. 1625: With A Brief Introductory Sketch From A.D. 89 To A.D. 1493 (2nd ed.). London: Hamilton, Adams and Co.
- Irving, Joseph (1879). The Book of Dumbartonshire. Vol. 1. Edinburgh: W. and A. K. Johnston. ISBN 1-152-62807-0.
- Irving, Joseph (1879). The Book of Dumbartonshire. Vol. 2. Edinburgh: W. and A. K. Johnston. ISBN 1-152-62807-0.
- Johnston, Thomas Brumby; Robertson, James Alexander (1899). Historical geography of the clans of Scotland (3rd ed.). London: W. & A. K. Johnston.
- MacGregor, Amelia Georgiana Murray (1898). History of the Clan Gregor, From Public Records And Private Collections; Compiled at the Request of the Clan Gregor Society. Vol. 1. William Brown. ISBN 1-152-29784-8.
- MacLean, John Patterson (1889). A history of the Clan MacLean from its first settlement at Duard Castle in the Isle of Mull, to the present period including a genealogical account of some of the principal families together with their heraldry, legends, superstitions, etc. Cincinnati: R. Clarke.
- Pitcairn, Robert (1833). Criminal Trials in Scotland: From A.D. MCCCCLXXXVIII to A.D. MDCXXIV. Vol. 2. Edinburgh: William Tait. ISBN 1-146-77249-1.
- Stodart, Robert Riddle (1881). Scottish Arms: Being A Collection of Armorial Bearings, A.D. 1370–1678, Reproduced In Facsimile From Contemporary Manuscripts, With Heraldic And Genealogical Notes. Vol. 2. Edinburgh: William Paterson.
- Strathallan, William Drummond (1889). Laing, David (ed.). The genealogy of the most noble and ancient house of Drummond. Glasgow.
- Way, George; Squire, Romilly (2000). Clans & Tartans. Glasgow: HarperCollins. ISBN 0-00-472501-8.
- Williams, Ronald (1998). Sons of the Wolf: Campbells and MacGregors and the Cleansing of the Inland Glens. Isle of Colonsay: House of Lochaber. ISBN 1-899863-42-7.
- Wormald, Jenny (1985). Lords and Men in Scotland: Bonds of Manrent, 1442-1603. Edinburgh: John Donald. ISBN 0-85976-127-4.

Sir Aulay MacAulay of Ardincaple Clan MacAulay Died: December 1617
Preceded by Walter MacAulay of Ardincaple	Chief of Clan MacAulay –1617	Succeeded by Alexander MacAulay of Ardincaple
