= Faslane Castle, Shandon Castle, and St Michael's Chapel =

Locations mentioned within the article (click to enlarge).

Faslane Castle and Shandon Castle were two mediaeval Scottish castles which once stood near the shores of the Gareloch, in Dunbartonshire, between the locations which later became the village of Garelochhead and town of Helensburgh. In the 19th century, the castles were thought to have dated back to the Middle Ages. At that time period, they were situated in within the mormaerdom of Lennox, which was controlled by the mormaers of Lennox. Today nothing remains of Faslane Castle; though in the 19th century certain ruins of Shandon Castle were said to have still existed. Near the site of Faslane Castle sits the ruinous St Michael's Chapel, which has also been thought to date to the Middle Ages.

== Faslane Castle ==
Faslane Castle (grid reference NS24949016) is a castle which once stood near Faslane, in Argyll and Bute (and also within the old county of Dunbartonshire). The site of the castle is located about 1.7 miles (3 km) north of the modern town of Shandon; and about 1 mile (2 km) south of the town of Garelochhead. The site sits overlooking the Gareloch and is today dominated by Her Majesty's Naval Base Clyde.

In the Middle Ages, the lands of Dunbartonshire were then part of the Lennox, and were controlled by the mormaers of Lennox. The early 13th century mormaer Ailín II granted an extensive tract of land lying on the eastern side of the Gare Loch to one of his younger sons, Amhlaíbh. Descending from Amhlaíbh was Walter of Faslane, who was the great-grandson of Ailín II. On the death of Mormaer Domhnall, Walter became the representative of the male line of the house of Lennox. With his marriage to Margaret, daughter of Domhnall, Walter became mormaer in his own right.

The castle, according to 19th-century historian William Fraser, was said to have dated back to the 12th century. The 21st century mediaevalist Geoffrey Stell compiled a census of mottes within Scotland and listed only four in Dunbartonshire—one of which is Faslane. According to Fraser, the castle was often occupied by earls of Lennox, or members of their family.

Than to Faslan the worthy Scottis can pass,
Quhar erll Malcom was bidand at defence;
Rycht glaid he was off Wallace gud presence.

— Blind Harry, The Wallace

Faslane Castle makes an appearance in the 15th century epic poem, known as The Wallace, composed by the maker Blind Harry. The story runs that Wallace sacked the town of Dumbarton, and laid waste the castle of Rosneath—the modern village of Rosneath sits on the opposite side of the Gare Loch from the sites of Faslane, Shandon, and Ardincaple castles. He then proceeded across the loch to Faslane Castle, where he was warmly received by Mormaer Maol Choluim I.

In 1543, Faslane was bestowed by Matthew Stewart, Earl of Lennox on Adam Colquhoun. In 1567, it and Garelochhead were acquired by Campbell of Ardkinlass, who sold it before 1583 to Campbell of Carrick. In 1693 it was in the hands of Sir John Colquhoun of Luss, who feud it to Archibald MacAulay of Ardincaple. According to the 19th-century historian Joseph Irving, in the mid 18th century the ruined Faslane Castle "furnished a shelter to the last representative of a once powerful family"—the last clan chief of the MacAulays of Ardincaple.

Fraser stated in 1869, that no buildings or any part of the castle was then visible. He stated that the only remaining trace of the castle was a green mound, which overlooked the junction of two deep glens, between two small rivulets of which the banks were steep. William Charles Maughan stated that the site of the castle could be distinguished, at the time of his writing, "by a small mound near the murmuring burn which flows into the bay". Maughan also wrote that at Faslane there stood an oak tree at place called in Scottish Gaelic Cnoch-na-Cullah (English: "knoll of the cock"); and that according to legend, when a cock crowed beneath the branches of the old oak upon the knoll, a member of Clan MacAulay was about to die. (Note: Maughan wrote: "A good way down from the house, near the shore, there stands the old oak tree, under whose boughs, according to tradition, the crowing of a cock presaged the death of a Macaulay. The name of the spot Cnoch-na-Cullah, or "Knoll of the Cock" seems appropriate to the legend".)

It has been stated that the site of Faslane Castle was destroyed when the West Highland Railway was built over top of the site, in 1891–1894.

== St Michael's Chapel ==
56°4′10″N 4°48′53″W

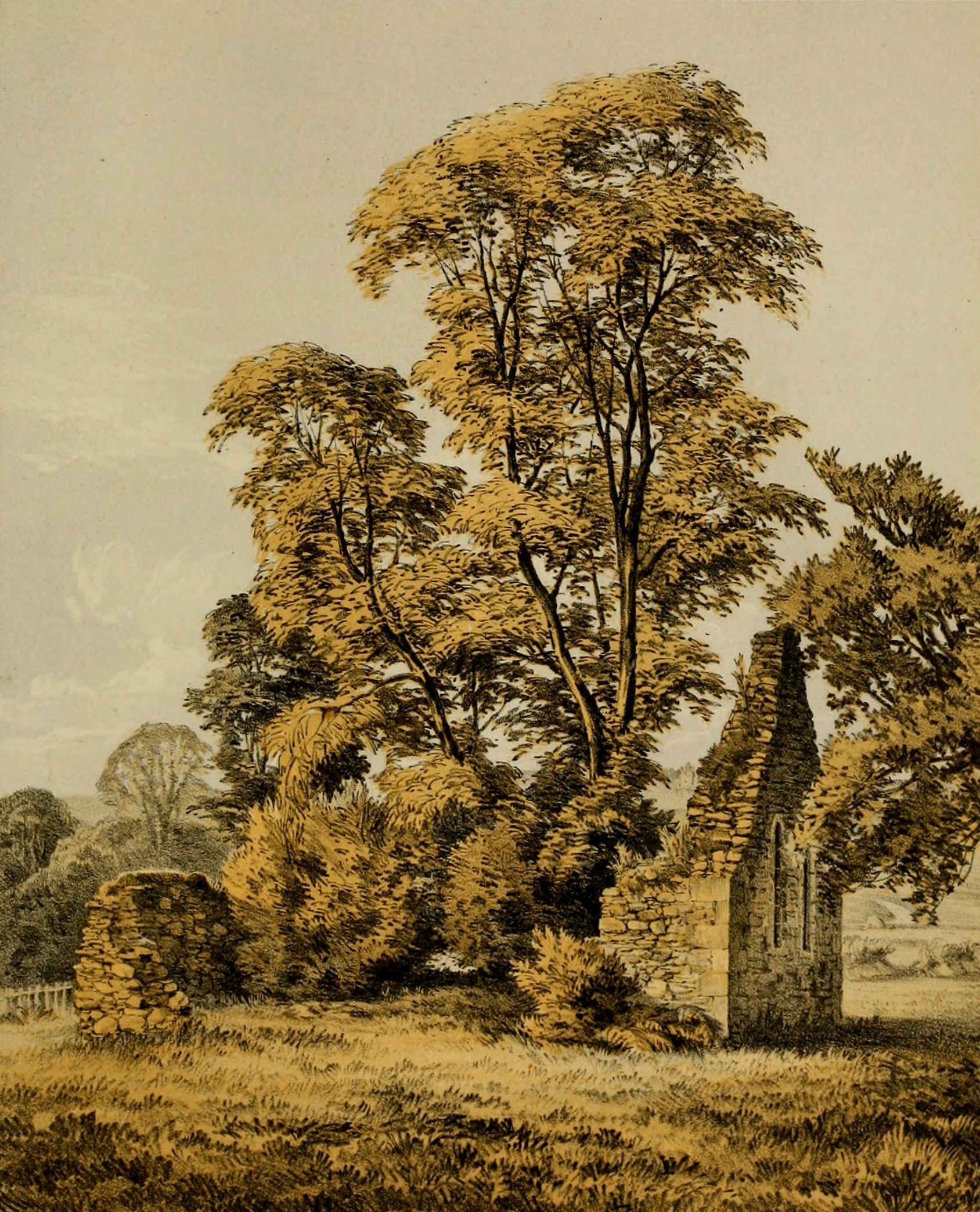
Ruinous St Michael's Chapel, about 1869.

Near the site of the castle is St Michael's Chapel (grid reference NS2489589862). Fraser described the ruins of the chapel as measuring 43 by 23 feet (13.1 by 7.0 m). He stated that stones had been removed from the site, except for two gable ends that still stood at the time of his writing (1869). He wrote that the foundations of what was reputed to be the priest's house, could still be seen between the chapel and the barn. On the site he noted that on the site of the stream, located beneath the bank, there was a spring called "The Priest's Well". George Chalmers, and the late 19th and early 20th century architects David MacGibbon and Thomas Ross, stated that the chapel had apparently been dedicated to St Michael, and that it may date from the 13th or 14th century. In 1963, the OS visited the site and noted that the chapel and the south wall had been rebuilt (without mortar), to a height of 1.3 metres (4.3 ft). However, there were no traces of the original burying ground, the priest's house, or the well. The site is currently situated within a modern cemetery.

The website for St Michaels Roman Catholic Church, in Dumbarton, states that there is a tradition of dedicating churches to the saint within the area. For example, in Glen Luss, there are the remains of a pre-Reformation church dedicated to the saint; in Helensburgh there is an Episcopalian church named 'Saint Michael and the Angels'; and in the Middle Ages there once was a chapel dedicated to St Michael in the Strathleven area of Dumbarton.

== Shandon Castle ==
56°3′6″N 4°47′59″W
Shandon Castle (grid reference NS257878) was a castle which once stood near the small village of Shandon—the village is situated between site of Faslane and the town of Helensburgh, which is situated on the shores of the Gare Loch. Fraser described the site of Shandon Castle as being on a hillside, above the house of Shandon. Fraser stated that remains of the castle still existed at the time of his writing and that the site was called "the old Dun". According to Fraser, no traditions concerning the castle then existed.

== See also ==
- Clan MacAulay, a Scottish clan which was once centred near the castle sites.
- Mormaer of Lennox, once lords of the Lennox district.

== Sources ==
- Irving, Joseph (1879). The Book of Dumbartonshire. Vol. 1. Edinburgh: W. and A. K. Johnston.
- Irving, Joseph (1879). The Book of Dumbartonshire. Vol. 2. Edinburgh: W. and A. K. Johnston.
- Fraser, William (1869). The Chiefs of Colquhoun and their Country. Vol. 2. Edinburgh: T. & A. Constable.
- Liddiard, Robert, ed. (2003). Anglo-Norman Castles. Woodbridge: The Boydell Press. ISBN 978-0-85115-904-1.
- Maughan, William Charles (1897). Annals of Garelochside, being an account historical and topographical of the parishes of Row, Rosneath and Cardross. Paisley: A. Gardner.
- Moir, James, ed. (1889). The Actis and Deidis of the Illustere and Vailyeand Campioun Schir William Wallace, Knicht of Ellerslie. Edinburgh: William Blackwood and Sons.
