= Allan M'Aulay =

Painting by Horace Vernet

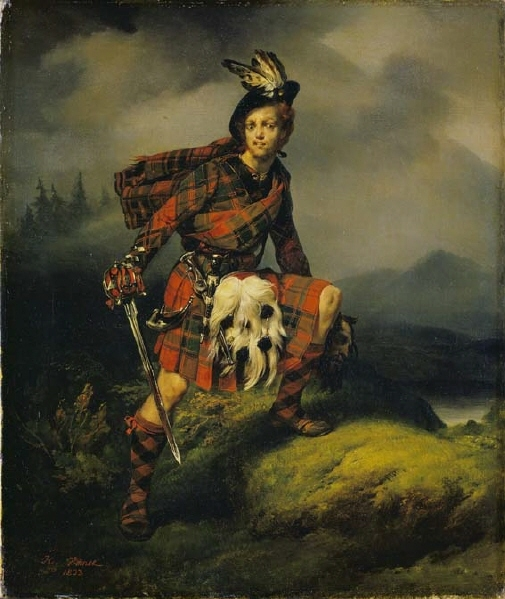
- Artist: Horace Vernet
- Year: 1823
- Type: Oil on canvas
- Dimensions: 64.7 cm × 54.7 cm (25.5 in × 21.5 in)
- Location: Wallace Collection, London

Allan M'Aulay is an 1823 painting by the French artist Horace Vernet. The work was inspired by Scottish author Sir Walter Scott's 1819 novel A Legend of Montrose. It depicts the character of Allan M'Aulay (a shortening of the historical Clan MacAulay). Allan M'Aulay Is shown carrying the severed head of his enemy Hector, killed in revenge for the murder of his own uncle.

Scott's novels were popular in France and inspired a number of depictions in music and art. The novel is set during the War of the Three Kingdoms in the mid-seventeenth century. It follows the fashionable romantic depiction of traditional Scottish Highlanders, which had reached its climax during George IV's Visit to Edinburgh in 1822.

It was exhibited at the Salon of 1824 in Paris. Today it is in the Wallace Collection in Marylebone, having been acquired in 1851 from a sale by the former French monarch Louis Philippe.

== Bibliography ==
- Ingamells, John. The Wallace Collection: French nineteenth century. Trustees of the Wallace Collection, 1985.
- Wrightsman, Jayne. The Wrightsman Pictures. Metropolitan Museum of Art, 2005.
