= Clan MacQuarrie =

Highland Scottish clan

- Crest: Out of an antique crown, An arm in armour embowed, grasping a dagger, all proper.
- Motto: Turris fortis mihi Deus, (translation from Latin: God is to me a tower of strength).
- Slogan: An t'arm breac dearg, (translation from Scottish Gaelic: The red tartaned army).

Profile
- Region: Inner Hebrides; Scottish Highlands
- District: Ulva, Staffa and the Isle of Mull
- Plant badge: pine.
- Clan MacQuarrie no longer has a chief, and is an armigerous clan
- Last Chief: Lachlan Macquarrie of Ulva
- Died: 1818

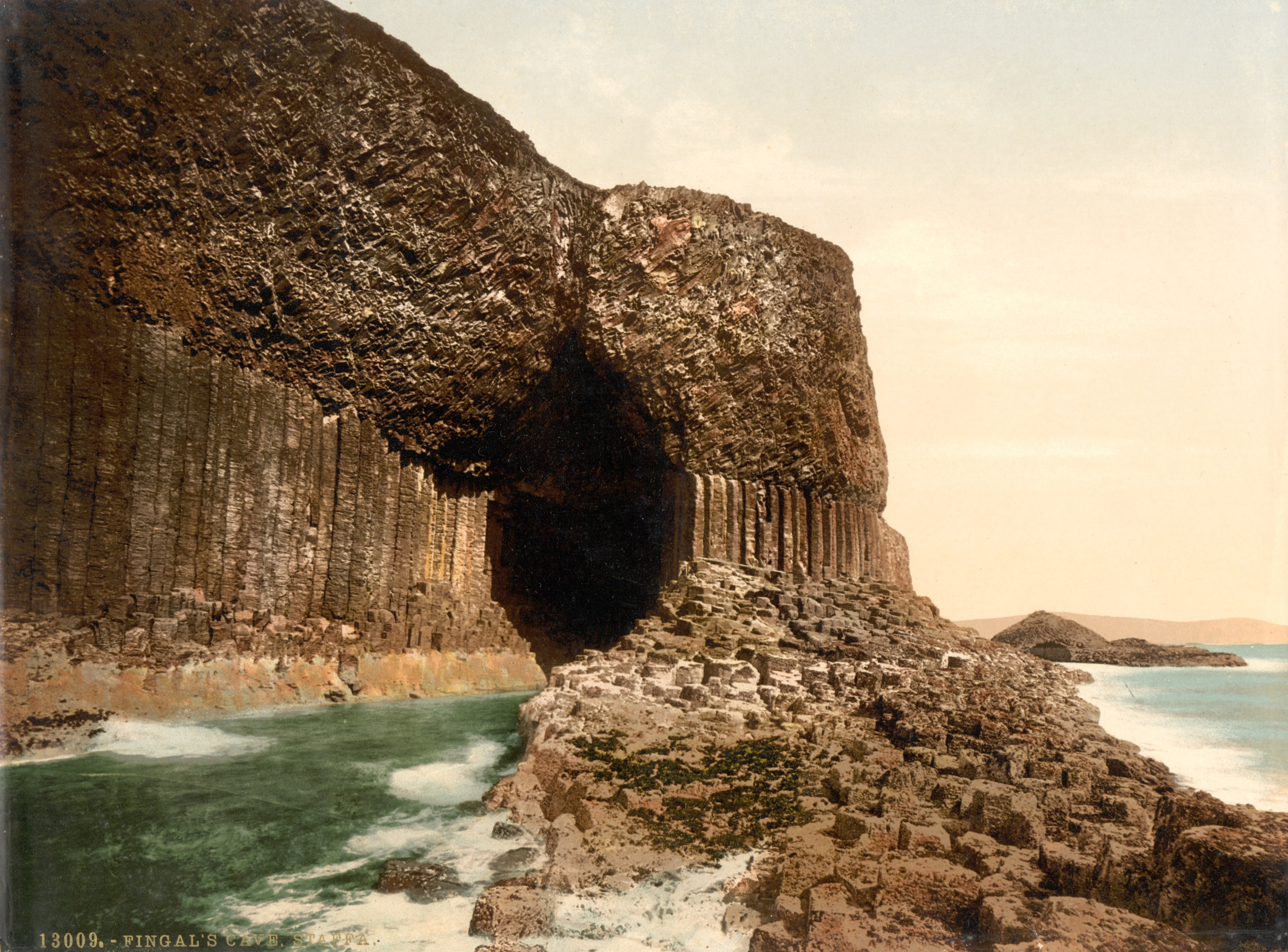
Fingal's Cave on Staffa, originally part of the MacQuarrie estate.

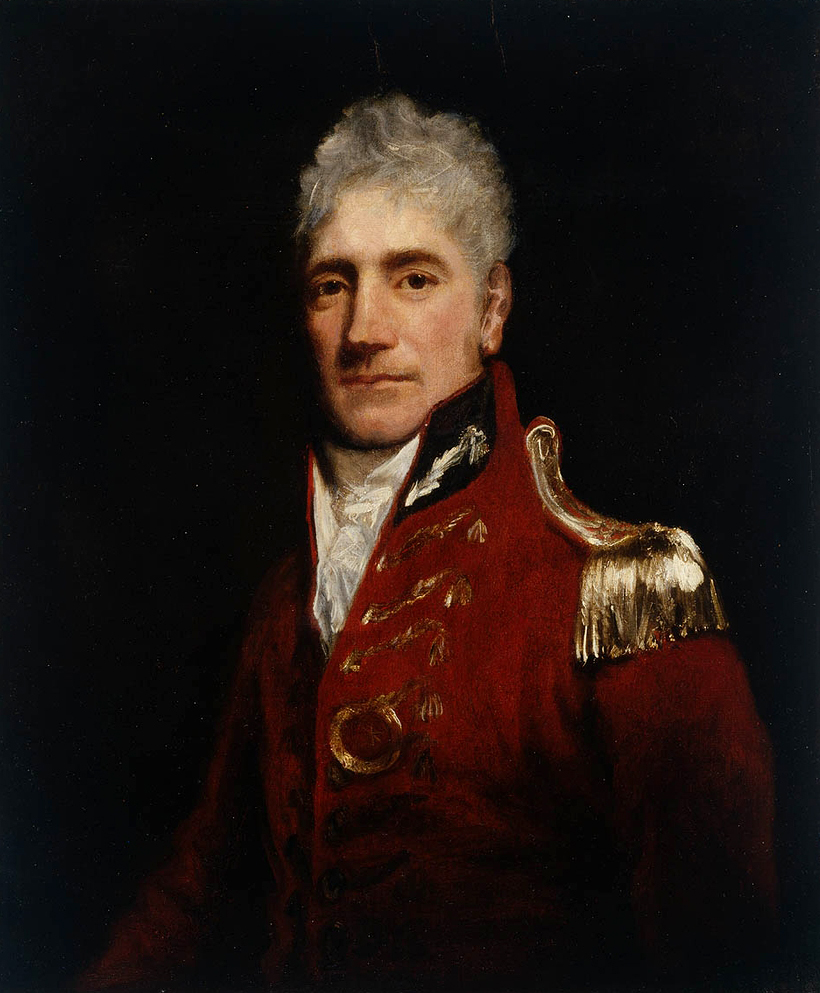
Major-General Lachlan Macquarie CB, "The Father of Australia."

Coat of arms belonging to the Chief of the MacQuarries of Ulva.

Clan MacQuarrie (also Quarrie, MacQuarie, McQueary, McQuary, MacQuaire, Macquarie) is an ancient Highland Scottish clan which owned the islands of Ulva, Staffa and Gometra as well as large tracts of land on the Isle of Mull, which are all located in the Scottish Inner Hebrides. Clan MacQuarrie (Scottish Gaelic for: son of Guaire) is one of the seven Siol Alpin clans descended from the Kings of the Picts and Dál Riata. Clan MacQuarrie is one of the four oldest Highland clans and can trace its ancestry to 9th century Kenneth MacAlpine, the first King of Scots. A 1450 manuscript describes the descent of Clan MacQuarrie from their namesake progenitor Guaire (Scottish Gaelic for: noble), brother of Fingon (ancestor of Clan MacKinnon) and Anrias (ancestor of Clan Gregor). They were fierce fighters in the Wars of Scottish Independence and fought in support of King Robert the Bruce at the Battle of Bannockburn in 1314.

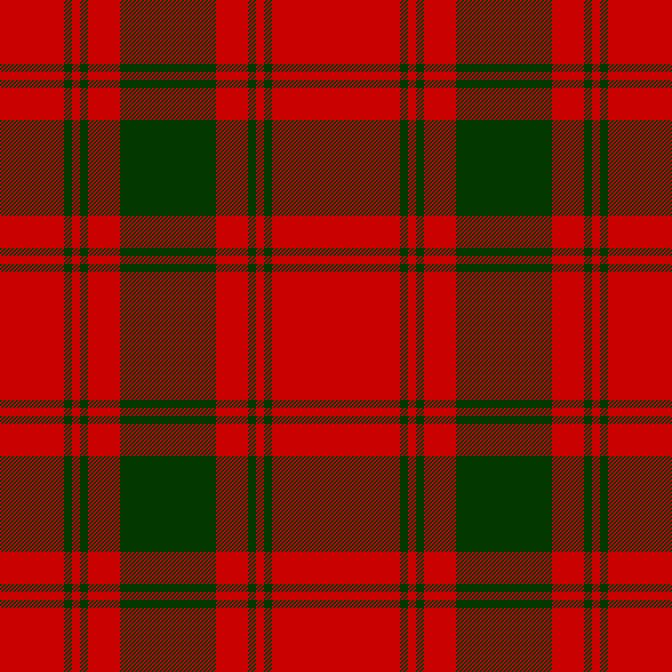
The MacQuarrie Modern tartan.

== History ==
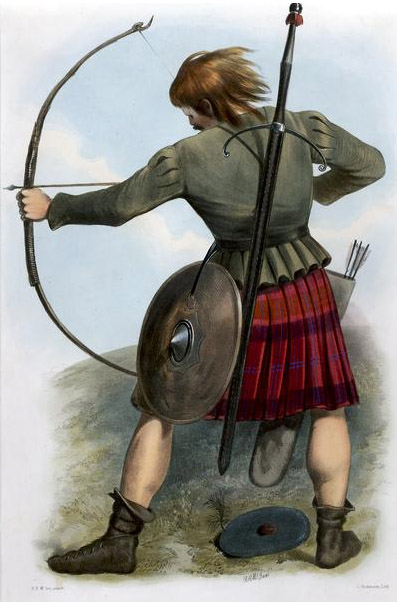
A Victorian era depiction of a member of the clan by R. R. McIan, from The Clans of the Scottish Highlands, published in 1845.

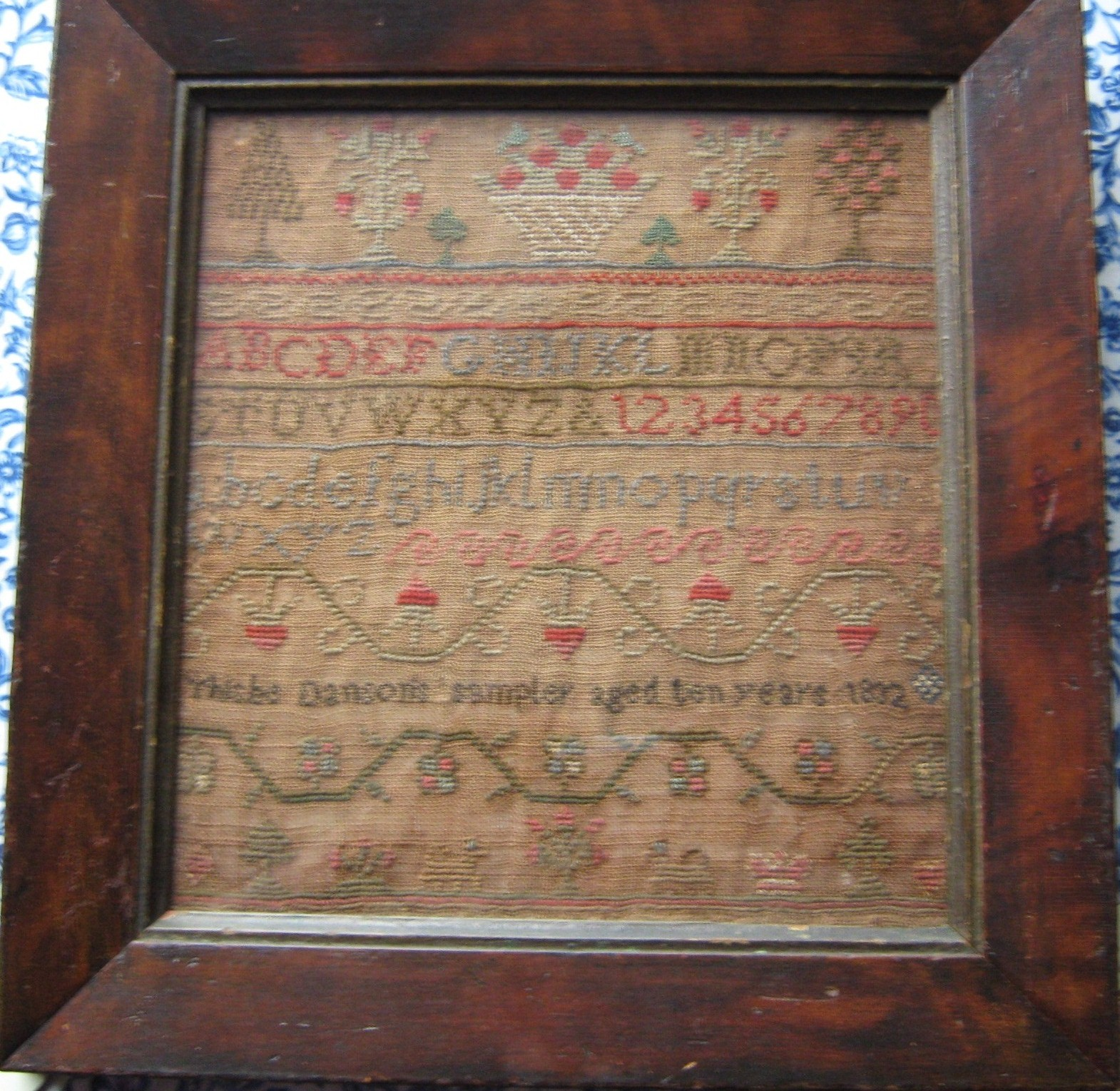
This Sampler was made by Thisbe Danson in 1832. She was great granddaughter to Lachlan MacQuarrie, XVI & last Chief of the Clan MacQuarrie.

Clan MacQuarrie is first found in possession of the island of Ulva in the Scottish Inner Hebrides, and followed the Lords of the Isles. The first record of Clan MacQuarrie is of the chief John Macquarrie of Ulva, who died in 1473. John's son, Dunslaff, was the chief of the clan during the forfeiture of the Lord of the Isles, after which the MacQuarries gained independence as a small, respected clan surrounded by a powerful ally in Clan MacLean. Following the fall of the Lordship of the Isles the clan followed Maclean of Dowart, and with the Macleans, the MacQuarries supported Domhnall Dubh's quest for the Lordship of the Isles at the beginning of the 16th century. In 1504 MacGorry of Ullowaa, along with other chiefs, was summoned to answer for aiding in Domhnall Dubh's failed rebellion.

The clan suffered grievously at the Battle of Inverkeithing on 20 July 1651, where they fought on the side of Charles II of England against an English Parliamentarian army led by John Lambert. During the battle many Scots deserted, and the remaining Scots were decisively defeated by the well-disciplined New Model Army of the English. Amongst the slain were Allan Macquarrie of Ulva, chief of Clan MacQuarrie, and most of his followers.

Clan MacQuarrie currently does not have a chief. The last chief of Clan MacQuarrie was Lauchlan Macquarrie of Ulva. MacQuarrie was head of the clan when Samuel Johnson and James Boswell visited Ulva in 1773. Debts to creditors forced the last chief to sell off his lands; and in 1778, at the age of 63, he joined the British Army. The chief then served in the American Revolutionary War, and died at the age of 103 on 14 January 1818.

The last chief and his wife Alice Maclean, daughter of Donald Maclean, 5th Laird of Torloisk, Isle of Mull, had eight children - four sons and four daughters. Three of his sons joined the British Army and died without issue; the only one to have children was his third son Donald, who was born around 1745. In July 1761, Donald was commissioned as one of the junior Ensigns in the Fencible Men of Argyllshire. After discharge from the army he moved to Liverpool, and on 28 October 1790 married Martha Lea at St Nicholas Church, Liverpool. They had one daughter, as recorded in a manuscript genealogy found amongst the papers of Lt. Colonel Charles MacQuarrie. It was compiled during the lifetime of the last Chief and because of certain births that are mentioned it was written sometime between 28 March 1816 and 14 January 1818. It states that Donald "follows the seafaring business and has one daughter who is married, in Liverpool, to the master of a trading vessel, who is employed in the foreign trade." Furthermore, the Liverpool Directory for the year 1818 describes Donald as "a Mariner, of 13 Ansdell Street, Liverpool."

The above-mentioned daughter, and thus granddaughter of Lauchlan MacQuarrie the XVI and last Chief of the clan, was called Agnes MacQuarrie and she was married on 28 January 1816 at Holy Trinity Church, Liverpool, to Captain William Danson, Master of the Frances, a ship named after his mother, and later Master of the Thisbe of Liverpool. A record of their marriage was published in the Monthly Magazine Vol. 41, 1816 - "Capt. William Danson of Workington to Miss McQuarrie of Liverpool".

On 6 April 1824, the Thisbe of Liverpool was reported to have sailed from Liverpool to Quebec, but it never arrived. The wreck of the Thisbe was reported in the Montreal Gazette on 24 Sep 1824: "A Jolly Boat with Thisbe of Liverpool on the stern, was picked up by the Margaret Ann, arrived at Miramichi, in longitude 36. The boat was bottom up. This vessel, it is stated sailed from Liverpool in April last with a very valuable cargo for Montreal and has not since been heard of."

Captain William Danson, his wife Agnes, née MacQuarrie, and four of their children perished on this journey, but their daughter Thisbe Danson (who was born at sea and named after the ship) survived and had issue, with descendants living today in the UK (Lancashire & Cumbria) and Pennsylvania, USA.

Donald MacQuarrie of Ansdell Street was buried in Liverpool on 10 June 1821 aged 75, and his wife Martha on 16 December 1827 aged 71.

A large portion of the ancient patrimonial property was repurchased by Major-General Lachlan Macquarie, brother of Lt. Colonel Charles MacQuarrie (see above) and Governor of New South Wales, and from whom Port Macquarie and Macquarie Island in the South Pacific derive their names. On 16 July 1804 both Lachlan MacQuarrie, the last Chief of the Clan, and his son Donald were present at the "christening" of Jarvisfield, the estate belonging to Major General Lauchlan Macquarie on the Isle of Mull. Governor Lachlan's mother and the last Chief were half-cousins. They both shared Lachlan MacQuarrie, the XIV Chief, as grandfather, but descended from different wives.

The Coat of Arms belonging to the Chief of the MacQuarries of Ulva is on display at Macquarie University in honour of Lachlan Macquarie.

== Military members ==
All of the following notes are taken from: Lachlan MacQuarrie XVI of Ulva, with notes on some Clansmen in India. By R. W. Munro, printed for private circulation, MCMXLIV.

- Archibald MacQuarrie, 86th Regiment (fl. 1802). A commission in the 86th Regt. was obtained for Archibald MacQuarrie (of Lagan-Ulva) by Major-General Lachlan MacQuarrie (see below).
- Charles MacQuarrie, 77th Regiment (fl.1796). Commissioned on 16 Jan. 1792 as Ensign in 77 Regt., in which Major-General Lachlan Macquarrie (see below) was then a Captain, but does not appear to have joined for some time after his appointment. Removed on 10 Jan. 1796 to 99th Regt.
- Major-General Lachlan Macquarie CB (1762-1824), 5th Governor of New South Wales and considered "The Father of Australia."

== Notable members ==
- Ralph McQuarrie (13 June 1929 – 3 March 2012) Academy Award-winning American conceptual designer and illustrator who designed the original Star Wars trilogy.
- Sir Albert McQuarrie (1 January 1918 - 13 January 2016) Conservative Member of Parliament for East Aberdeenshire 1979 - 1983. Banff and Buchan 1983 - 1987. Freeman City of Gibraltar 1982; Knight Batchelor 1987
- American filmmaker, Academy Award-winning screenwriter and director Christopher McQuarrie (born 25 October 1968).

== English spelling variants ==
As the MacQuarrie surname is very ancient and of Scottish Gaelic origin, a precisely accurate translation to the English language is impossible. Due to anglicisation and migration over eleven centuries many variants of the name MacQuarrie have been promulgated. Individuals and families with the following established spelling variants are members of clan MacQuarrie:

MacQuarrie, MacQuarie, Crarie, Crary, MacQuary, MacQuarry, McQuarrie, McQuarie, McQuary, McQuarry, McQueary, McQuerry, M'Quarrie, M'Quarie, M'Quary, M'Quarry, MacQuery, MacQuore, MacQuorie, MacQuorrie, MacQewry, McQuery, McQuore, McQuorie, McQuorrie, McQewry, M'Query, M'Quore, M'Quorie, M'Quorrie, M'Qewry, MacQuire, McQuire, MacQuaire, MacQuairie, MacQuhirrie, McQuharrie, McQuhurrie, McQuhore, McQuhorre, MacQuhirr, M'Quhoire, M'Quhury, M'Quhurrie, M'Quhurie, M'Quhyrry, M'Quhirrich, M'Qwhyrrcht, Makquhurrie, Makquhory, Makquharry, Makquhary, Makquharie, Makquyre, Makquoyrie, Quarry, MacWharrie, MacWharrey, Wharrey, M'Worich, M'Warie, M'Vorich, Makwidy, Wharrie, M'Coirry, McCurry, M'Corry, Corry, McCwerie, McCrary, McCreary, Makcory, Makcorry, Makcurre, M'Rore, MacGuaidhre, MacGuarie, MacGorrie, MacGorry, McGorre, McGorry, McGory, M'Goyre, M'Gourie, M'Gowry, M'Geir, Gorey, MacGurrie, MacGurr, Gurr, MacGuaire, MacGuire, MacGuire, MacGwyer, MacGwier, MacGyver, McGuaire, McGuire, McGwyer, McGwire, M'Guaire, M'Guire, M'Guire, M'Gwyer, M'Guire, Maguire, MacGeir, Quirie, Querry, and Query.

== See also ==
- Ulva
- Staffa
- Siol Alpin
- Isle of Mull
- Scottish clan
- King of Scots
- Scottish Highlands
