= Ardencaple Castle =

Former castle near Helensburgh

- Rhu, Helensburgh, Argyll and Bute, Scotland
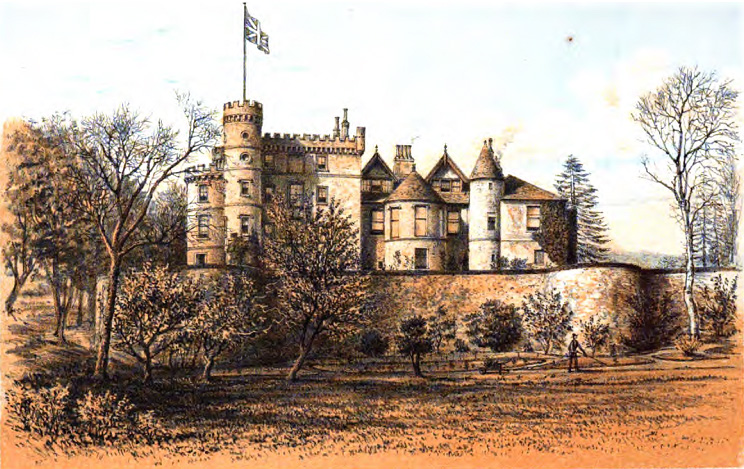
- Ardencaple Castle, 1879

Site information
- Controlled by: unknown lairds of Ardincaple: c.1100s-1460s MacAulay lairds of Ardincaple: c.1460s-1760s Campbells of Argyll: c.1760s-1852 Colquhouns of Luss: 1852-1923; H. Stromberg-Macaulay: 1923-1931; Adelaide Parker Voorheis: 1931-1934 consortium of developers: 1934-1937; Royal Navy (HMNB Clyde): 1937-
- Open to the public: Grounds only
- Condition: 1 remaining tower

Location
- Coordinates: 56°0′32.88″N 4°45′25.09″W
- Height: remaining tower: 45 feet (14 m)

Site history
- Built: original: c.12th century rebuilt c.18th & 19th centuries
- Built by: original: unknown rebuilt: Campbells of Argyll
- In use: c.12th century to 20th century Nav aid: 1957-present
- Demolished: 1957

Ardencaple Castle, also known as Ardincaple Castle, and sometimes referred to as Ardencaple Castle Light, is a listed building, situated about 1 statute mile (1.6 km) from Helensburgh, Argyll and Bute, Scotland. Today, all that remains of the castle is a tower, perched on the edge of a plateau, looking down on a flat tract of land between it and the shore of the Firth of Clyde. The original castle was thought to have been built sometime in the 12th century, and part of the remains of the original castle were said to have existed in the 19th century. Today, that sole remaining tower is used as a navigational aid for shipping on the Firth of Clyde. Because of its use as a lighthouse the tower has been called Ardencaple Castle Light.

== Lairds of Ardincaple ==
The word Ardencaple or Ardincaple has been said to be derived from the Gaelic Ard na gCapull, meaning "cape of the horses", or "of the mares", or "height of the horses". In 1351 this place name was recorded as Airdendgappil. From the Middle Ages the lands of Ardencaple were controlled by the Lairds of Ardincaple. By the late 15th century or 16th century the lairds had adopted the surname MacAulay. By this time the Laird of Ardincaple was considered the clan chief of Clan MacAulay.

The fortunes of the Lairds of Ardincaple failed in the 18th century, and they were forced to divide and sell, piece by piece, the lands of Ardincaple and their other estates to pay debts. Archibald MacAulay, 9th laird (died 1752), began the process around 1700, and the sales continued under his sons - one of whom wrote a primer on shorthand in an effort to raise money. By the time the 12th laird died around 1767, the roof had fallen in and the overall condition of the castle had deteriorated to such an extent that he had been forced to abandon his residence there and live in nearby Laggarie, having completed the sale of the MacAulay estates.

== Renovations to the Ardincaple Estate ==
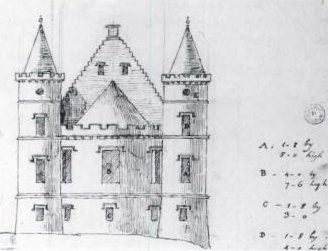
Sketch by Robert Adam of his planned addition to Ardincaple Castle in 1774.

The estate was then purchased by John Campbell, 4th Duke of Argyll, and remained in possession of the Campbells well into the 19th century. It was during the Campbell's tenure as lairds of Ardencaple in the 18th century that extensive development was done on the estate by Robert Adam - Scotland's foremost architect of the time. In 1764, while the house was in possession of Lord Frederick Campbell, Robert Adam was first consulted about work on the castle. The house was then irregularly shaped, and Adam came up with a plan for the addition of castle-style additions on the western side of the house which faced the Gare Loch. However, nothing came of this scheme and it wasn't until 1774 that Adam came up with a set of drawings for an addition to the southern half of the west front of the house. This addition was made up of three-bay-windowed, D-shaped tower set in between two smaller turrets (pictured left). Later photographs of Ardincaple Castle show that Adam's extension had been altered or that some features present in his sketch were omitted from being implemented. For instance, the conical roofs, the crow-stepped gable in the sketch do not appear in photographs of the castle. Photographs of Ardincaple Castle show that the tower and southern turret had one more storey than appear in Adam's sketch According to David King, it is possible that Adam was responsible for the added extra floor to the tower, but that is it very unlikely Adam altered the turret because the altered turret broke the symmetry of the addition. Also, Adam had planned that the tower would contain a D-shaped dressing room on its main floor (upper floor). However, it was later decided to make the room oval shaped. David King remarks that Adam had planned a pleasant ceiling for this room, but that there is no sign of it in photographs of 1957. George Campbell, 8th Duke of Argyll was born at Ardencaple Castle on 30 April 1823. By 1852 the Duchess Dowager of Argyll sold the Ardencaple estate to the wealthy Colquhouns of Luss.

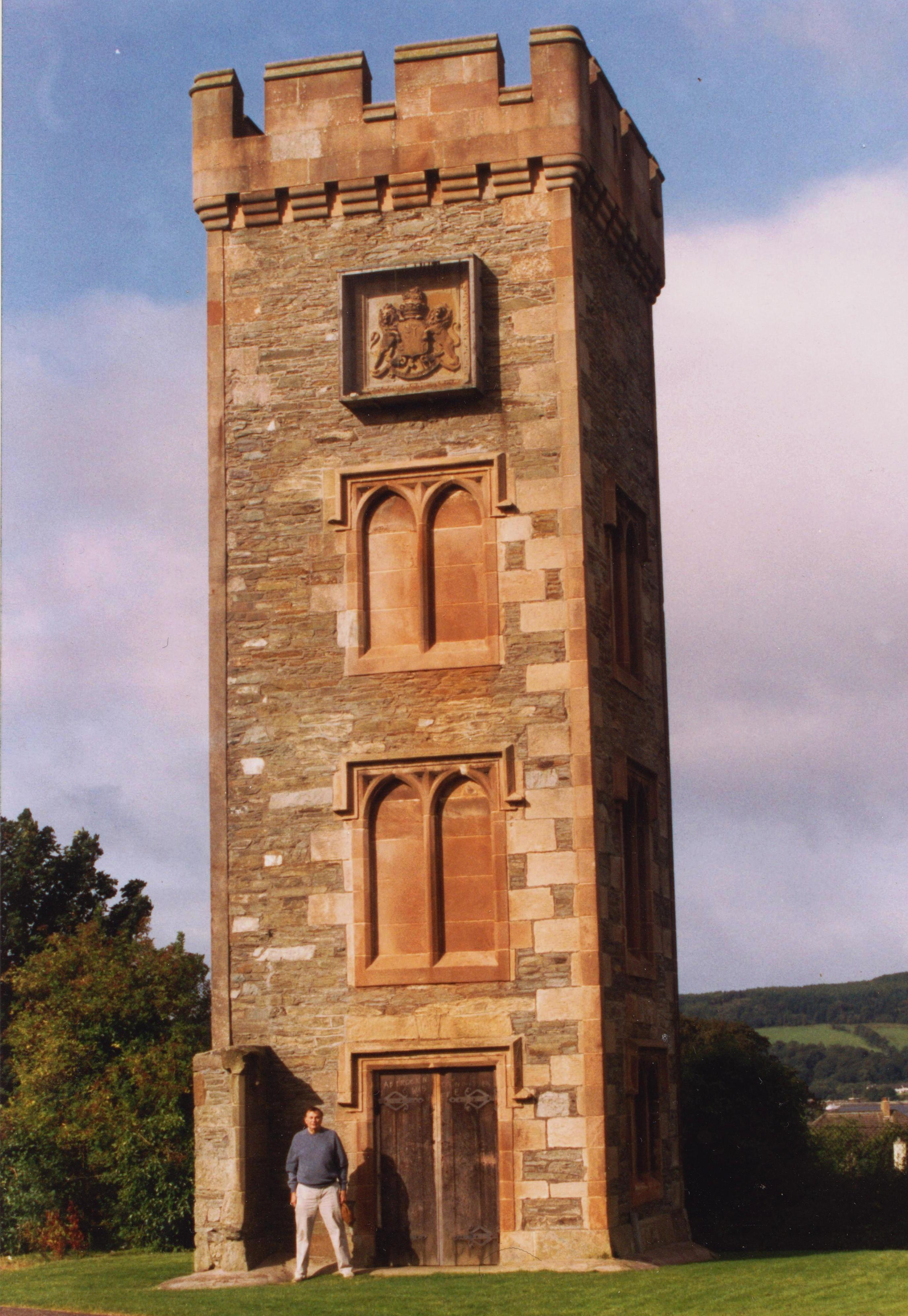
Ardencaple Castle Light. Today the tower is used as a navigational aid for shipping on the Firth of Clyde. Photo by Robie Macauley.

== Modern era and destruction of the castle ==
In 1923, Sir Iain Colquhoun sold the castle to Mrs. H. Macaulay-Stromberg, a wealthy American, who restored the castle and lived there until her death, in 1931. The castle then passed to Adelaide Parker Voorheis until 1935, when it passed to a consortium of developers who had constructed, in 1936-1937 a housing estate on what used to be the Tower Lawn. The castle then was requisitioned by the Royal Navy with the outbreak of World War II.

In 1957 most of the castle was demolished by the government in order to build naval housing for the nearby HMNB Clyde (Faslane Naval Base & Royal Naval Armaments Depot, Coulport), though one tower was left to be used as a mount for navigational beacons and transit lights for the Royal Navy. From then on, the 45-foot (14 m) high tower was known as "Ardencaple Castle Range Rear Light", and had two green lights mounted on its south-west corner. Ardencaple Castle has been considered a Category B listed building since 14 May 1971.

== Gallery ==
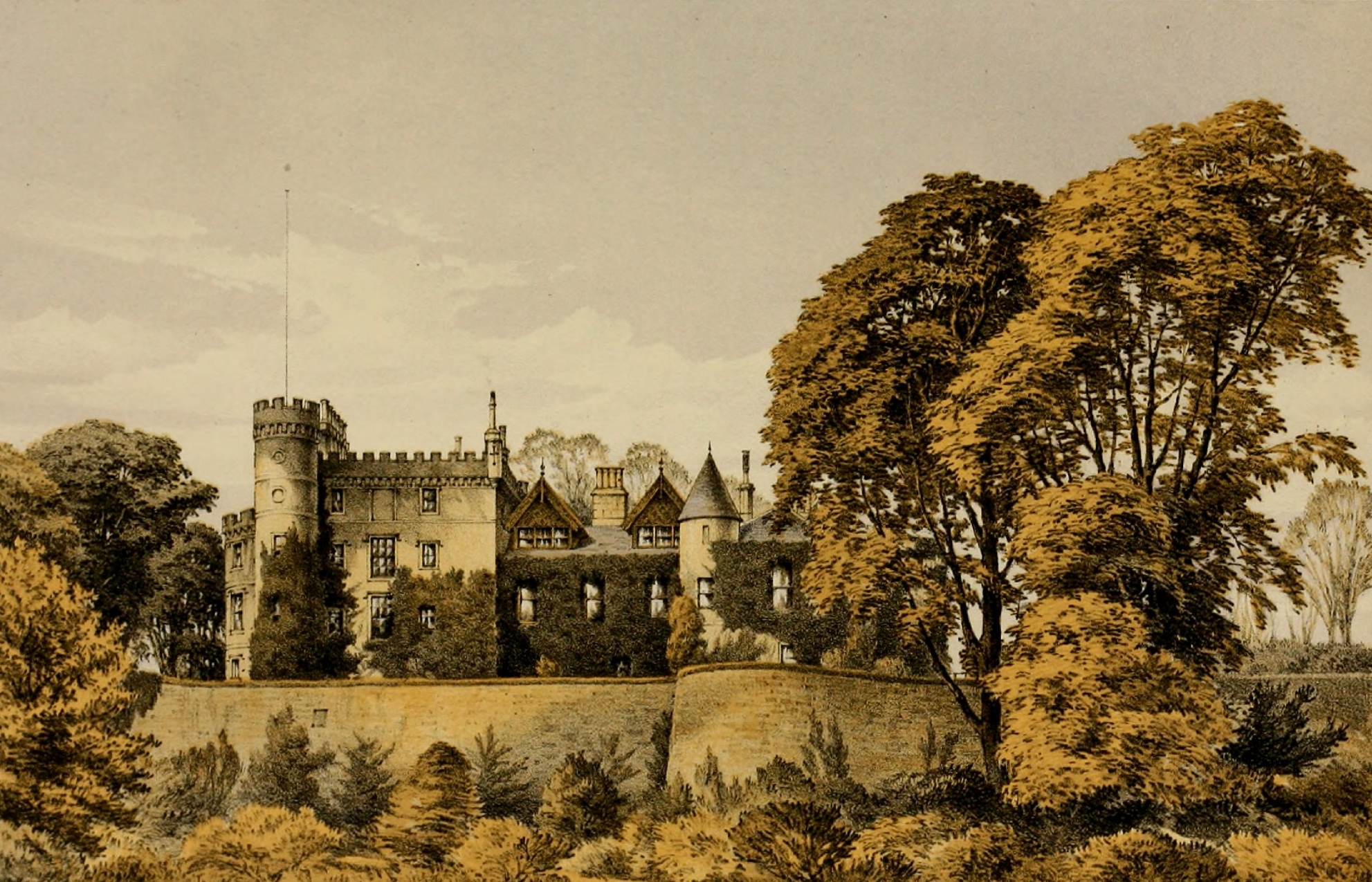
Sometime before 1869

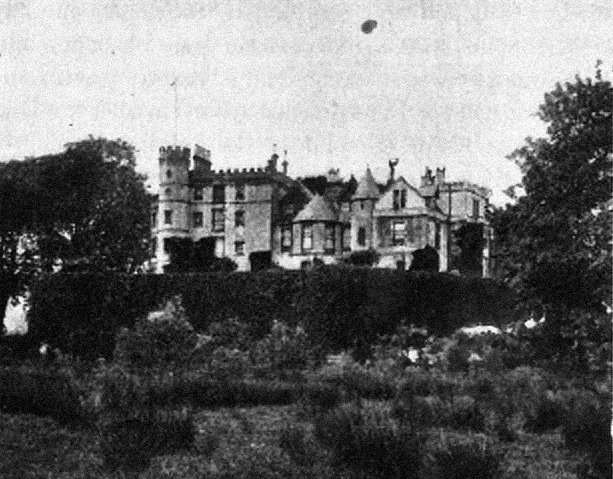
Photo taken around 1900

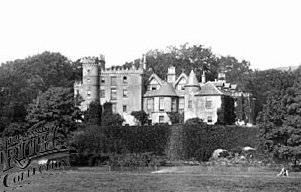
Photo published in 1901

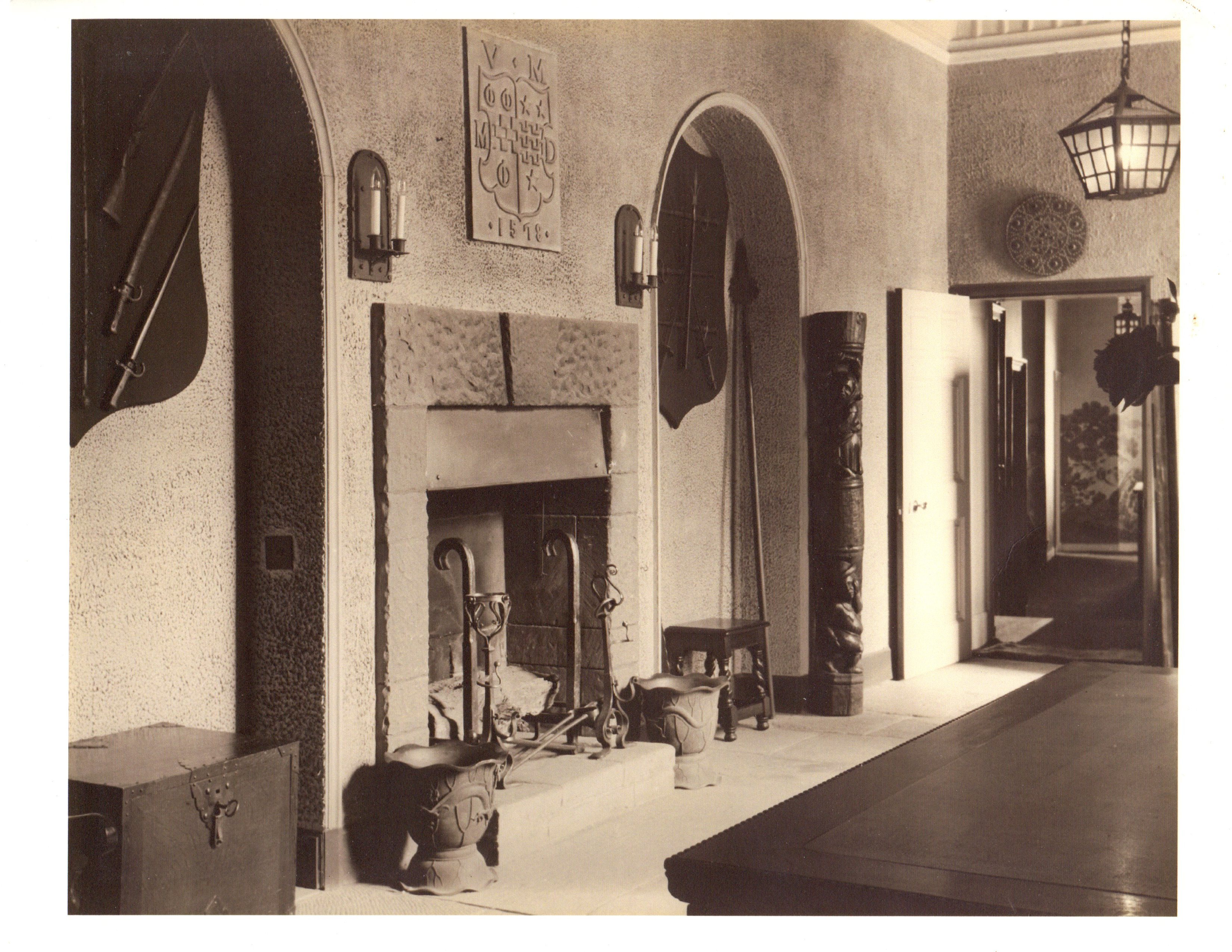
Grand fireplace, 1937

== See also ==
- Clan MacAulay
- Rhu
- Helensburgh
