= Rhu =

Village in Argyll and Bute, Scotland

Coordinates: 56°1′19″N 4°47′3″W

Rhu: Scottish Gaelic: An Rubha
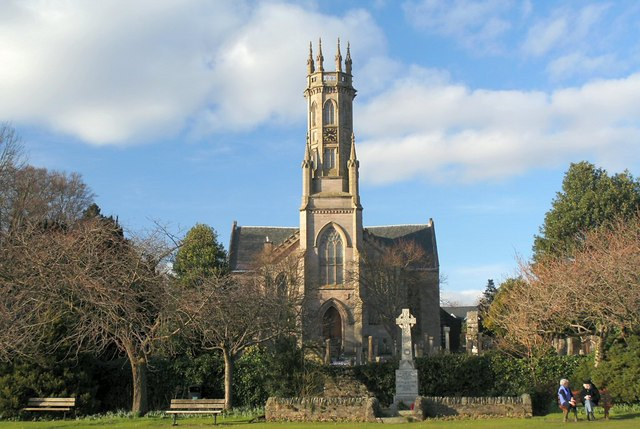
- Parish Church, Rhu

- Location within Argyll and Bute
- Population: 1,930 (2020)
- OS grid reference: NS269840
- Council area: Argyll and Bute
- Lieutenancy area: Dunbartonshire
- Country: Scotland
- Sovereign state: United Kingdom
- Post town: HELENSBURGH
- Postcode district: G84
- Police: Scotland
- Fire: Scottish
- Ambulance: Scottish
- UK Parliament: Argyll, Bute and South Lochaber
- Scottish Parliament: Dumbarton

Rhu (/ruː/; Scottish Gaelic: An Rubha [ən ˈrˠu.ə]) is a village and historic parish on the east shore of the Gare Loch in Argyll and Bute, Scotland.

The traditional spelling of its name was Row, but it was changed in the 1920s so that outsiders would pronounce it correctly. The name derives from the Scots Gaelic rubha meaning point. The parish of Row, containing also the town of Helensburgh and most of the village of Garelochhead, was formed out of Roseneath and Cardross in 1643–48.

It lies north-west of the town of Helensburgh on the Firth of Clyde, in Argyll & Bute, and historically in the county of Dunbartonshire. Like many settlements in the area, it became fashionable in the 19th century as a residence for wealthy Glasgow shipowners and merchants. It has its own Community Council, which covers both Rhu and Shandon.

== Rhu and Shandon Parish Church ==
Rhu and Shandon Parish Church dates from 1851 and stands on the site of an 18th-century predecessor. Amongst those buried in the kirkyard is Henry Bell, whose Comet was the world's first commercially successful steamship. In 1851 the marine engineer Robert Napier built the statue which today marks Bell's grave.

Famously a Theological controversy took place in Rhu known as the "Row Heresy", involving the Church of Scotland minister John McLeod Campbell who began to teach doctrines contrary to the Westminster Confession of Faith and was subsequently thrown out of the ministry in May 1831.

Since December 2015 the Parish Minister is the Reverend David T. Young BA, BD Min (Hons), MTh, RN.

== Rhu Primary School ==
Rhu Primary is a non-denominational and co-educational school situated in the heart of the village of Rhu. It enjoys close links with the adjacent church and surrounding village, in particular the playgroup and the senior citizens club. It is a community school which has grown up and developed with the neighbouring area and many members of the village make a very welcome contribution to the life of the school. School activities such as church services, concerts, sports days and fundraising activities are supported not only by the parents/carers but by the people of the village generally. It covers the stages P1 to P7, and after modernisation the school is housed in one main building.

== Yachting ==
Rhu is a base for yachting. There is a 235-berth marina and many yacht moorings as the loch is sheltered. The Royal Northern and Clyde Yacht Club has had its clubhouse in Rhu since 1937.

Near the entrance to the Gare Loch there are two sandspits opposite each other, one on either shore of Rhu and Rosneath, forming a narrow constriction about 430 metres (1,410 ft) across. This is known as either the "Rhu Narrows" or the "Rosneath Narrows". The loch would have been cut off and a lagoon formed if the "longshore drift" was allowed to occur naturally. Groynes prevent this from happening.

== Whisky smuggling ==
A large trade in illicit distillation of whisky was carried out during the 1700s/1800s. Most of the stills were in Aldownick Glen, a deep ravine 1/4 mile (400 m) from the church. In the Heart of Midlothian, Sir Walter Scott alludes to the smugglers here, and to this gorge under the name of the Whistlers Glen, so called probably from the fact that those on the outlook gave warning of the approach of a stranger by imitating the whistle of the curlew. When George IV visited Scotland, he expressed a desire to taste real smuggled whisky; and the Duke of Argyll procured a barrel from a still at the mouth of this glen for his consumption; though the bargain was a difficult one to make, the Duke having to meet the smugglers personally at the end of Row Point.

== Gala Day ==
Rhu and Shandon Gala is held each year, on the 2nd Saturday in June, and is one of Rhu's older traditions.

== Rhu Amateurs Football Club ==
Rhu Amateurs Football Club have been in existence since 1896, they played Garelochead on 1 January that year.

Rhu Amateurs Football Club won the Scottish Amateur Cup in 1967. They played the final at Hampden Park, Glasgow beating Penilee 3–1 after being behind 0–1 at half time. The goalscorers being Neil (Pony) Walsh who scored two and one from Barry Irvine.

Rhu AFC are still going strong and play home games at Ardenconnel Park in the village. There is a small club house that sells refreshments on match days.

== Rhu and Rangers Football Club ==
Rhu is the birthplace of footballer and co-founder of Rangers, Peter Campbell (born late 1850s in Rhu, Dunbartonshire; died January 1883). He made 24 Scottish Cup appearances for Rangers and scored 15 goals.

Matt Dickie was born in Rhu in 1873, and became a goalkeeper. He played his early football with teams in Helensburgh, then joined Renton, at that time a fading force in the early Scottish game, although they did appear in the Scottish Cup Final of 1895. That summer Matt Dickie joined Rangers, and he made his first team debut on 15 August 1895 in a 5–1 home win over St Mirren.

Members of another Rhu family played significant parts in the history of Rangers. James Parlane was at Ibrox as an inside forward in the Willie Waddell and Willie Thornton era, between 1945 and 1950, and his son Derek played at Ibrox as a striker for 10 years from 1970. It is thought that they were the only father and son to have played for the club at that stage. It was Willie Waddell who signed Derek.
