= Norse–Gaels =

People of mixed Gaelic and Norse heritage

Norse settlement

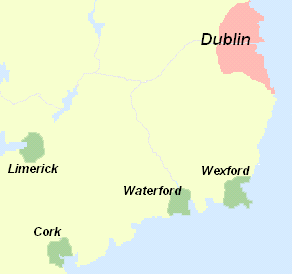
Regions of Scotland, Ireland and Man settled by the Norse

The Norse–Gaels (Old Irish: Gall-Goídil; Irish: Gall-Ghaeil; Scottish Gaelic: Gall-Gàidheal; Manx: Goal-Gael, 'foreigner-Gaels') were a people of mixed Gaelic and Norse ancestry and culture. They emerged in the Viking Age, when Vikings who settled in Ireland and in Scotland became Gaelicised and intermarried with Gaels. The Norse–Gaels dominated much of the Irish Sea and Scottish Sea regions from the 9th to 12th centuries. They founded the Kingdom of the Isles (which included the Hebrides and the Isle of Man), the Kingdom of Dublin, the Lordship of Galloway (which is named after them), and briefly ruled the Kingdom of York (939–944 AD). The most powerful Norse–Gaelic dynasty were the Uí Ímair or Ivar dynasty.

Over time, the Norse–Gaels became ever more Gaelicised and disappeared as a distinct group. However, they left a lasting influence, especially in the Isle of Man and Outer Hebrides, where most placenames are of Norse–Gaelic origin. Several Scottish clans have Norse–Gaelic roots, such as Clan MacQueen, Clan MacDonald, Clan MacDougall and Clan MacLeod. The elite mercenary warriors known as the gallowglass (gallóglaigh) emerged from these Norse–Gaelic clans and became an important part of Irish warfare. The Viking longship also influenced the Gaelic birlinn and longa fada, which were used extensively until the 17th century. Norse–Gaelic surnames survive today and include MacIvor, MacAskill, and [Mac]Cotter.

== Name ==
The meaning of Gall-Goídil is 'Foreign[er] Gaels' and although it can in theory mean any Gael of foreign origin, it was used of Gaels (i.e. Gaelic-speakers) with some kind of Norse identity. This term is subject to a large range of variations depending on chronological and geographical differences in the Gaelic language, e.g. Gall Gaidel, Gall Gaidhel, Gall Gaidheal, Gall Gaedil, Gall Gaedhil, Gall Gaedhel, Gall Goidel, Gall Ghaedheil, etc. The modern term in Irish is Gall-Ghaeil or Gall-Ghaedheil, while the Scottish Gaelic is Gall-Ghàidheil.

The Norse–Gaels often called themselves Ostmen or Austmen, meaning East-men, a name preserved in a corrupted form in the Dublin area known as Oxmantown which comes from Austmanna-tún (homestead of the Eastmen). In contrast, they called Gaels Vestmenn (West-men) (see Vestmannaeyjar and Vestmanna).

Other terms for the Norse–Gaels are Norse-Irish, Hiberno-Norse or Hiberno-Scandinavian for those in Ireland, and Norse-Scots or Scoto-Norse for those in Scotland.

== History ==
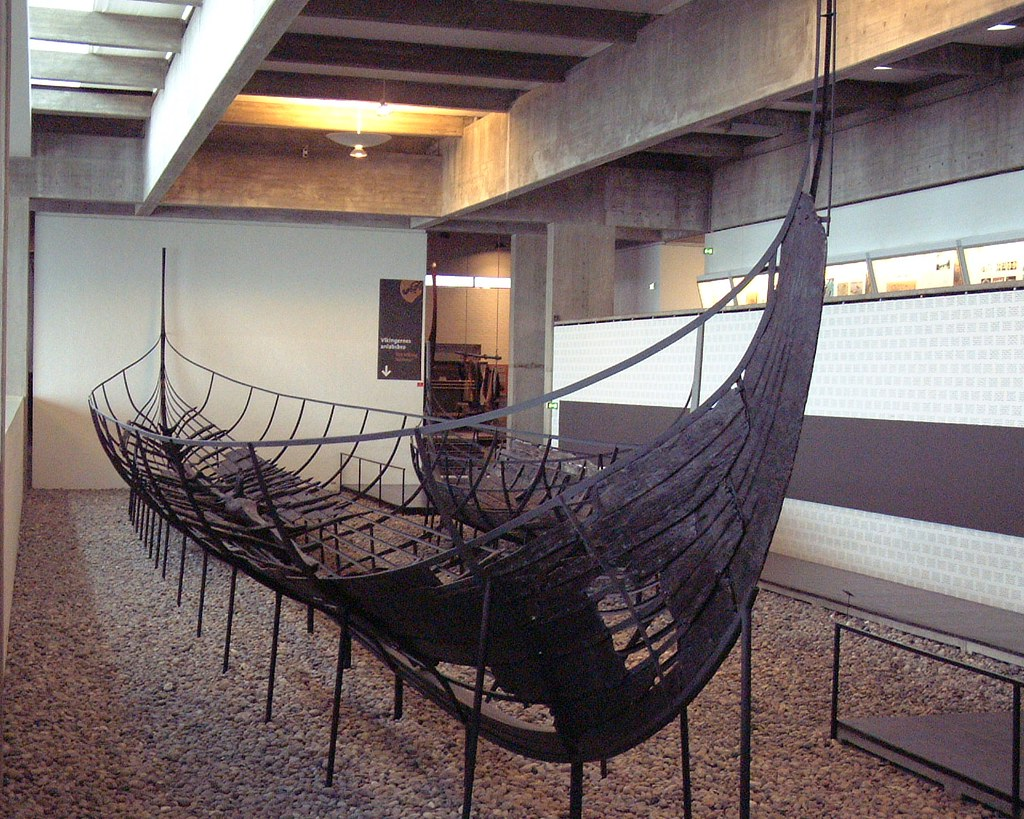
Skuldelev II, a Viking warship built in the Norse–Gaelic community of Dublin (c. 1042)

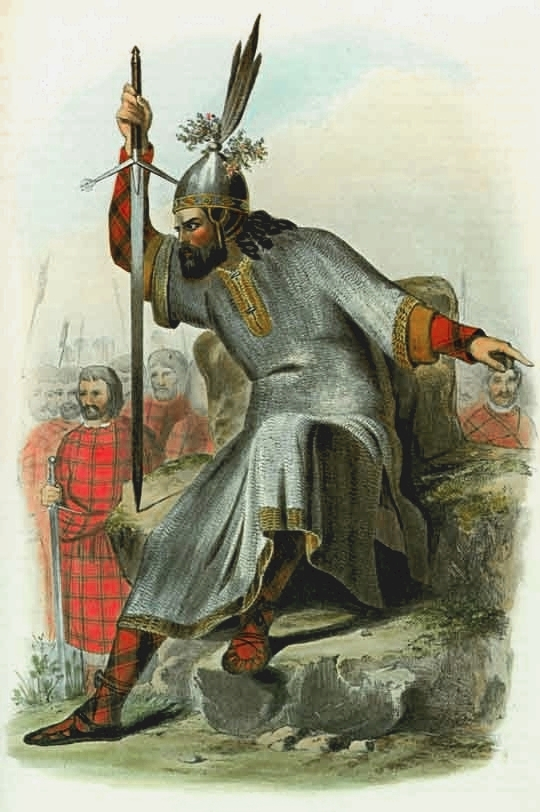
R. R. McIan's impression of a Norse–Gaelic ruler of Clan MacDonald, Lord of the Isles

The Norse–Gaels originated in Viking colonies of Ireland and Scotland, the descendants of intermarriage between Norse immigrants and the Gaels. As early as the 9th century, many colonists (except the Norse who settled in Cumbria) intermarried with native Gaels and adopted the Gaelic language as well as many Gaelic customs. Many left their original worship of Norse gods and converted to Christianity, and this contributed to the Gaelicisation.

Gaelicised Scandinavians dominated the region of the Irish Sea until the Norman era of the 12th century. They founded long-lasting kingdoms, such as those of Mann, Dublin, and Galloway, as well as taking control of the Norse colony at York.

=== Ireland ===
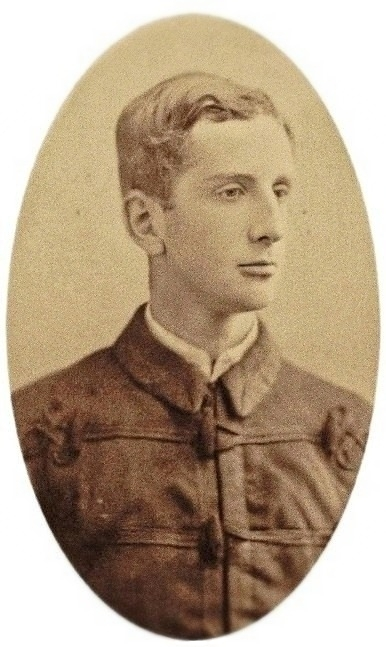
In 1873, Anthropological Institute of Great Britain and Ireland shows an Irishman as an example of the Nordic type.

The Norse are first recorded in Ireland in 795 when they sacked Rathlin Island. This island is located off of the Northeast coast of Ireland and contains with it many gravesites with formal evidence of existence. Annals of Ulster states that the first raid on this island was known as the Loscad Rechrainne o geinntib, otherwise known as 'the burning of Rechru by heathens.' Sporadic raids then continued until 832, after which they began to build fortified settlements throughout the country. Norse raids continued throughout the 10th century, but resistance to them increased. The Norse established independent kingdoms in Dublin, Waterford, Wexford, Cork and Limerick. These kingdoms did not survive the subsequent Norman invasions, but the towns continued to grow and prosper.

The term Ostmen was used between the 12th and 14th centuries by the English in Ireland to refer to Norse–Gaelic people living in Ireland. Meaning literally "the men from the east" (i.e. Scandinavia), the term came from the Old Norse word austr or east. The Ostmen were regarded as a separate group from the English and Irish and were accorded privileges and rights to which the Irish were not entitled. They lived in distinct localities; in Dublin they lived outside the city walls on the north bank of the River Liffey in Ostmentown, a name which survives to this day in corrupted form as Oxmantown. It was once thought that their settlement had been established by Norse–Gaels who had been forced out of Dublin by the English but this is now known not to be the case. Other groups of Ostmen lived in Limerick and Waterford. Many were merchants or lived a partly rural lifestyle, pursuing fishing, craft-working and cattle raising. Their roles in Ireland's economy made them valuable subjects and the English Crown granted them special legal protections. These eventually fell out of use as the Ostmen assimilated into the English settler community throughout the 13th and 14th centuries.

=== Scotland ===
The Lords of the Isles, whose sway lasted until the 16th century, as well as many other Gaelic rulers of Scotland and Ireland, traced their descent from Norse–Gaelic settlements in northwest Scotland, concentrated mostly in the Hebrides.

The Hebrides are to this day known in Scottish Gaelic as Innse Gall, 'the islands of foreigners'; the irony of this being that they are one of the last strongholds of Gaelic in Scotland.

=== Iceland and the Faroes ===
It is recorded in the Landnámabók that there were papar or culdees (Gaelic monks) in Iceland before the Norse. This appears to tie in with comments of Dicuil and is given weight by recent archaeological discoveries. The settlement of Iceland and the Faroe Islands by the Norse included many Norse–Gael settlers as well as slaves and servants. They were called Vestmen (Western men), and the name is retained in Vestmanna in the Faroes and the Vestmannaeyjar off the Icelandic mainland.

A number of Icelandic personal names are of Gaelic origin, including Njáll, Brjánn, Kjartan and Kormákur (from Niall, Brian, Muircheartach and Cormac). Patreksfjörður, an Icelandic village, was named after Saint Patrick. A number of placenames named after the papar exist on Iceland and the Faroes.

According to some circumstantial evidence, Grímur Kamban, seen as the founder of the Norse Faroes, may have been a Norse Gael:

According to the Faereyinga Saga ... the first settler in the Faroe Islands was a man named Grímur Kamban – Hann bygdi fyrstr Færeyar, it may have been the land taking of Grímur and his followers that caused the anchorites to leave ... the nickname Kamban is probably Gaelic and one interpretation is that the word refers to some physical handicap (the first part of the name originating in the Old Gaelic camb 'crooked' ... another that it may point to his prowess as a sportsman (presumably of camóige / camaige 'hurley' – where the initial syllable also comes from camb). Probably he came as a young man to the Faroe Islands by way of Viking Ireland, and local tradition has it that he settled at Funningur in Eysturoy.

== Mythology ==
Heinrich Zimmer (1891) suggested that the Fianna Cycle of Irish mythology came from the heritage of the Norse–Gaels. He suggested the name of the heroic fianna was an Irish rendering of Old Norse fiandr "enemies", and argued that this became "brave enemies" > "brave warriors". He also noted that Finn's Thumb of Knowledge is similar to the Norse tale Fáfnismál. Linguist Ranko Matasović, author of the Etymological Dictionary of Proto-Celtic, derives the name fíanna from reconstructed Proto-Celtic *wēnā (a troop), while linguist Kim McCone derives it from Proto-Celtic *wēnnā (wild ones).

== Modern names ==
Some modern surnames and forenames are of Norse-Gaelic origin.

=== Surnames ===
Gaelic	Anglicised form	"Son of-"
Mac Asgaill	MacAskill, McCaskill, Castell, Caistell	Áskell
Mac Amhlaibh (confused with native Gaelic Mac Amhlaidh, Mac Amhalghaidh)	MacAulay, MacAuliffe, Cowley, Cawley, MacCamley, McCamley, Kewley	Óláf
Mac Corcadail	McCorquodale, Clan McCorquodale, Corkill, Corkhill, Corkell, Corkey, McCorkindale, McCorkle, McQuorkell, McOrkil	Þorketill
Mac Coitir	Cotter, MacCotter, Cottier	Óttar
Mac DubhGhaill, Ó DubhGhaill,	Doyle, McDowell, MacDougal	Dubgall
Mag Fhionnain	Gannon	“the fair” (possibly in reference to someone with Norse ancestry)
Mac Ìomhair	MacIver, Clan MacIver, MacIvor, MacGyver, McKeever, etc.	Ivar
Mac Leòid	MacLeod	Ljótr
Mac Raghnall	Crellin, Crennel	Rögnvald
Mac Shitrig	MacKitrick, McKittrick	Sigtrygg
Mac Thórfinnr	MacToryn, MacThoryngt, McCorryn, MacCorran, Corran, Corrin, Turpin	Þorfinnr
Ross	Hrossey (Olde Norse for horse Island, now Mainland Orkney)	hross (meaning horse)

=== Forenames ===
Gaelic	Anglicised form	Norse equivalent
Amhlaibh (confused with native Gaelic Amhlaidh, Amhalghaidh)	Aulay (Olaf)	Ólaf
Goraidh	Gorrie (Godfrey, Godfred), Orree (Isle of Man)	Godfrið
Ìomhar (confused with native Gaelic Éibhear, Éimhear > Mac Éibhir, Mac Éimhir)	Ivor	Ívar (Ingvar)
Raghnall	Ranald (Ronald, Randall, Reginald)	Rögnvald
Somhairle	Sorley (or Samuel)	Sumarliði (Somerled)
Tormod	Norman	Þormóð
Torcuil	Torquil	Torkill, Þorketill

== See also ==
- Caill Tomair, a sacred grove near Dublin targeted by Brian Boru in the year 1000
- Scandinavian York
- Old English (Ireland)
- Clan Donald
- Earl of Orkney
- Faroe Islanders
- Gallowglasses
- Icelanders
- Kings of Dublin
- List of rulers of the Kingdom of the Isles
- Diocese of Sodor and Man
- Galley
- Lord of the Isles
- Lords of Galloway
- Papar

== Bibliography ==
- Downham, Clare (2009). "Hiberno-Norwegians and Anglo-Danes". Mediaeval Scandinavia. 19. University of Aberdeen. ISSN 0076-5864.
- Haywood, John (1995). The Penguin Historical Atlas of the Vikings. London: Penguin. ISBN 0140513280.
- McDonald, R. Andrew (1997). The Kingdom of the Isles: Scotland's Western Seaboard, c. 1100 – c. 1336. East Linton: Tuckwell Press. ISBN 1898410852.
- Ó Cróinín, Dáibhí (1995). Early Medieval Ireland, 400–1200. London: Longman. ISBN 0582015669.
- Oram, Richard (2000). The Lordship of Galloway. Edinburgh: John Donald. ISBN 0859765415.
- Scholes, Ron (2000). Yorkshire Dales. Ashbourne, Derbyshire: Landmark. ISBN 1901522415.
