= McCorkindale =

McCorkindale, and MacCorkindale, are surnames of Norse-Gaels origin.

== Origins and Variants ==
The surname is an anglicised form of the Scottish Gaelic MacCorcadail and Irish Gaeilge MacThorcadail which are patronyms meaning ‘son of ’ ‘(Mac)Corcadail’ and ‘(Mac)Thorcadail’ derive from the old Norse personal name ‘Thorketil’ composed of the elements Thor ‘God of thunder, strength, and war’, and ketil ‘cauldron’, ‘kettle’, or ‘helmet’.

If translated literally, it could be expressed as ‘son of Thors Helmet’ or ‘son of Thunder Cauldron’.

The following table lists shared surname variants derived from the old Norse meaning ‘son of Thorketil’:

Scottish Gaelic	Irish Gaeilge	Anglicised Variants	Son of
MacCorcadail	MacThorcadail	McCorkindale, MacCorkindale, MacCorcadale, MacCorcodale MacCorquodale, McCorquodale, MacQuorcodale, MacThorcadail, Corkindale, McCorkell, Corkill, MacCorkill, and McCorkle.	Þorkell

== Notable people ==
- Don McCorkindale (1904−1970), South African boxer
- Isabel McCorkindale (1885–1971), Scottish-born Australian temperance leader
- John McCorkindale (1867–1953), Scottish footballer (Partick Thistle, national team)
- John McCorkindale (born 1934), Scottish footballer (Kilmarnock FC, Gillingham FC)
- Simon MacCorkindale (1952−2010), English actor and film director
- Douglas H. McCorkindale (born 1939), American business executive

== See also ==
- Torquil
- Mac Torcaill
- List of Scottish Gaelic surname
- Norse-Gaels
- Clan McCorquodale
