= Corrin (surname) =

Origin
- Languages: Manx, Irish
- Meaning: "son of Odhran" "son of Thórfinnr" "son of Corraidhín/Corrán"
- Region of origin: Isle of Man, Ireland

Other names
- Variant forms: MacCorran, McCorryn, McCorrin, MacOran, Corean, Corran, Corine

Corrin is a surname of Manx and Irish origin.

There are several explanations have been proposed for the Manx name, including a derivation from the Gaelic patronymic Mac Odhráin, meaning “son of Odhrán”, as well as containing the Old Norse personal name Þorfinnr, meaning "Thor's finder".

In Ireland, Corrin is also recorded as an anglicized form of Ó Corraidhín, meaning “descendant of Corraidhín”

== Origins ==
Genealogical research have shown the certain patriarchs native to the Isle of Man have ancient Celtic roots. More specifically, those bearing the Corrin surname carry the Y-chromosome Haplogroup R1b, which indicates a paternal lineage traced back to the ancient Celts.

== Etymology ==
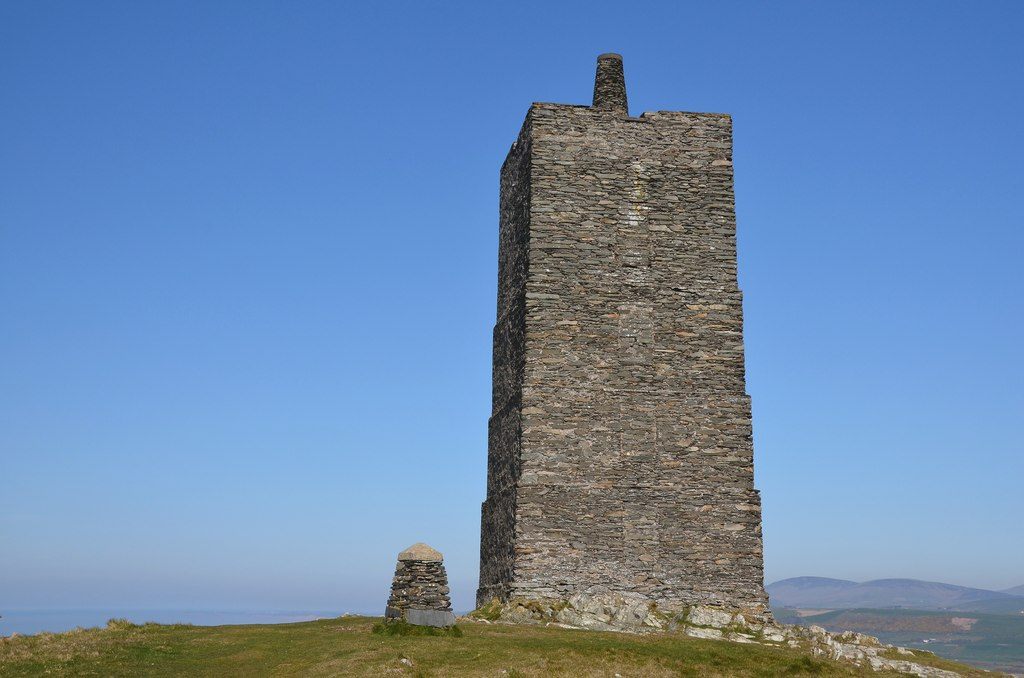
Corrin's Tower was built on Peel Hill near Peel in 1806 by a Mr. Thomas Corrin - an eccentric gentleman. Inscribed on one of the pillars: "Corrin's Pillar, 1850. This pillar was erected six feet distant from the base of this mount, and within the inclosure, upon its top rest the mortal remains of Alice Corrin and her two beloved children. This pillar, tower, and mount, were erected by Thomas Corrin, to perpetuate her memory until reanimated by the power of God."

=== Manx ===
Manx historian Arthur William Moore notes that the name might stem from the Irish contraction Mac Oran or Mac Odhrain ("son of Odhran"), which translates to "pale-faced" or "little dark-haired one"- a reference to Saint Odhran, who was reputedly Saint Patrick’s charioteer.

However, J. J. Kneen suggests a Norse-Gaelic origin, associating the name with Þorfinnr under the Gaelic form Mac Torin. Keen argues the family may took their name from Thorfinn Ottarsson, who was the son of Norse-Gaelic king, Óttar of Dublin. Thorfinn, a powerful Manx chief and warrior from the Hebrides, was instrumental to influence Somerled to nominate his son, Dugall, to claim the Lordship of the Isles from the Norse Vikings and unpopular ruler Godred Olafsson, and be proclaimed "King of the Isles". Ottarson would campaign under Somerled to invade the Kingdom of Mann and the Isles against the Vikings, as well as take part in the Battle of Epiphany. Somerled soon led an invasion against Godred Olafsson at the Battle of the Isle of Man, which would be a success. As a result of the victory, Somerled seized the Kingdom of Mann and the Isles.

These competing interpretations are thoroughly discussed in a study published in a journal by the Isle of Man Family History Society by Wally Corrin.

=== Irish ===
According to Irish genealogist Patrick Woulfe, Corrin is among the anglicized forms of the Irish surname Ó Corraidhín ("descendant of Corraidhín"), which he treats as a variant of Ó Corráin and identifies as the origin of the modern Irish surname Curran in Ireland. Woulfe notes that the personal name Corraidhín derives from a diminutive of corradh ("spear" or "little spear"), and records additional anglicized forms including O Corrin, O Corren, O Currine, Curreen, Curren, Currin, Creen, and Crean.

Woulfe separately records the patronymic Mac Corraidhín ("son of Corraidhín"), noting the historical anglicizations M’Corrine and M’Curine. While these forms could potentially resemble early Manx spellings, Woulfe's entries appear to treat the Irish lineages independently.

== Historical forms ==
Historical forms associated with the Manx surname include Mac Corrane (1422), Mac Corrin (1504), Mac Corryn and Mac Coryn (1515). Later spellings include Corrin, Corran, Corine, Coreene and Currin. A published compilation of Moore’s and Kneen’s references records Mac Corrin in 1504 and Mac Corryn and Mac Coryn in the early sixteenth-century manorial rolls.

Kneen also associated earlier names, including Maktory/Mactoryn and Mac Thoryngt, with the proposed Norse derivation. The compilation includes records concerning people connected with the Isle of Man as well as records from the island itself; However, it does not demonstrate a continuous pedigree linking all the bearers of these names, and it remains unproven.

== Families ==
=== Isle of Man ===
The Corrins, recorded historically as the McCorryns, are documented across several parishes of the Isle of Man in early church registers, land registries, and legal records, indicating a well-established presence. The family held land across multiple parishes, particularly in the south of the island in Rushen, Arbory, and Malew, where an early family seat was located near Rushen Abbey. Early sixteenth-century manorial records also note the variants M'Corran and McCoryn in the eastern parishes of Lonan, Onchan and Maughold. According to the Manorial Rolls, McCorryn households were established in Arbory by 1529, with John McCorryn and Jacob McCorryn recorded as holding land in the treen of Ballacarmyk. Subsequent records trace these arly Corrin landholdings across Ballacarmyk, Colby, Ardary, and other parts of Arbory, though it distinguishes recorded changes in tenancy from proposed family relationships, some of which remain conjectural.

=== Ireland ===
Woulfe describes Ó Corraidhín as common in Munster and south Leinster, although generally anglicized Curran. He associates the separate Mac Corraidhín family with Skreen in County Sligo and states that it was more numerous in County Leitrim by the end of the sixteenth century.

== Notable people ==
Notable people with the surname include:

- Brian Corrin (born 1945), Canadian Politician
- Emma Corrin (born 1995), English actor
- George Corrin (1922 – 2015), American scenic and graphic designer
- Hattie M. Strong (née Corrin), American philanthropist
- Matthew Corrin (born 1982), Canadian businessman
- Penelope Corrin (born 1975), Canadian actor and writer
- Jack Corrin (1932 – 2019), Manx politician and deemster on the Isle of Man
- James Robinson Corrin, Manx preacher and politician, co-founder of the Manx Labour Party
- John Corrin (1934 – 2005), Manx politician and Government Minister
- Regan Corrin (born 2007), Manx high jumper and long jumper
- Thomas Corrin (1878 – 1936), English footballer

== See also ==
- Thorfinn (name)
- Manx surnames
- Irish surnames
- Curran (surname)
- Cotter family
- Chronicles of the Kings of Mann and the Isles
- Dune: The Battle of Corrin
