= USS McKeever =

USS McKeever may refer to more than one United States Navy ship:

- USS Edward J. McKeever Jr. (SP-684), a patrol vessel and minesweeper in commission from 1917 to 1919
- USS McKeever Brothers (SP-683), a patrol vessel and minesweeper in commission from 1917 to 1919
