= McCaskill =

McCaskill is a surname. Notable people with the surname include:

- Alton McCaskill (born 2003), American football player
- Amal McCaskill (born 1973), American professional basketball player
- Billie June McCaskill (1930 – 2011), American herbarium curator
- Claire McCaskill (born 1953), U.S. Senator from Missouri
- Ted McCaskill (1936 – 2016), Canadian professional hockey player
- Ian McCaskill (1938 – 2016), British weatherman
- Kirk McCaskill (born 1961), Canadian professional baseball player and son of Ted
- Vern McCaskill (1902 – 1992), American nurseryman of Camellias and Irises, the father of Billie June.

== See also ==
- MacAskill (disambiguation)
