= Mac Íomhair =

- Mac Íomhair in a Gaelic type.
- Gender: Masculine
- Language: Irish

Other gender
- Feminine: Nic Íomhair, Bean Mhic Íomhair, Mhic Íomhair

Origin
- Language: Irish
- Meaning: "son of Íomhar"

Other names
- Variant form: Mag Íomhair

Mac Íomhair is a masculine surname in the Irish language. The name translates into English as "son of Íomhar". The surname originated as a patronym, however it no longer refers to the actual name of the bearer's father. The form Nic Íomhair is borne by unmarried females; the forms Bean Mhic Íomhair and Mhic Íomhair are borne by married females. A variant form of Mac Iomhair is Mag Íomhair; the feminine forms of this surname are likewise Nig Íomhair, Bean Mhig Íomhair, and Mhig Íomhair. All these Irish surnames have various Anglicised forms.

== Etymology ==
Mac Íomhair translates into English as "son of Íomhar". A variant form of the surname is Mag Íomhair. These surnames originated as patronyms, however they no longer refer to the actual name of the bearer's father. The names Iomhar, Imir, Ímair, Ímar, HÍmair are variant Gaelic derivatives of Ívarr, an Old Norse personal name. Native Gaelic surnames Mac Éibhir and Mac Éimhir also exist, and Flann Ó Riain, in his "What's That" column in The Irish Times, states that some Mac Íomhairs may originally have been Mac Éibhir.

== Feminine forms ==
Mac Íomhair and Mag Íomhair are masculine surnames. The form of Mac Íomhair for unmarried females is Nic Íomhair, whereas the (unmarried) feminine form of Mag Íomhair is Nig Íomhair; these names translate into English as "daughter of the son of Íomhar. The form of Mac Íomhair for married females is Bean Mhic Íomhair, whereas the (married) feminine form of Mag Íomhair is Bean Mhig Íomhair; these particular feminine names can also been rendered simply as Mhic Íomhair and Mhig Íomhair; these four surnames translate to "wife of the son of Íomhar.

== Anglicised forms ==
Mac Íomhair has been Anglicised variously as MacIvor, MacIver, MacKiver, MacKiever, MacÍmir, MacÍmair, MacÍmar, MacHÍmair, MacGyver, MacKever, MacKevor, MacKeever, McKeever, MacKeevor, MacCure, MacIvers, Ivers, Eivers,Èvors, and Keevers. Anglicised forms of Mag Íomhair include MacGeevor, MacGeever, and MacGaver. According to the Patrick Woulfe, the surnames are of Scottish origin. They may also be Native Irish.

== See also ==
- Ímar
- Uí Ímair
- Norse–Gaels
