= MacGyver (disambiguation) =

MacGyver is the title character of an American action-adventure television franchise.

MacGyver may also refer to:

== MacGyver TV franchise ==
- MacGyver (1985 TV series), a series that ran from 1985 to 1992
- MacGyver (2016 TV series), a reboot series that ran from 2016 to 2021

== Other ==
- MacGyver the Lizard (born 2012), Argentine red tegu lizard and Internet celebrity

== See also ==
- McIver
- MacIvor (disambiguation)
