= Stefán Kristjánsson =

Icelandic chess grandmaster (1982–2018)

- Stefán Kristjánsson at the 2007 European Team Chess Championship

Personal information
- Born: 8 December 1982 Reykjavík, Iceland
- Died: 28 February 2018 (aged 35) Reykjavík, Iceland

Chess career
- Country: Iceland
- Title: Grandmaster (2011)
- Peak rating: 2503 (March 2014)

Stefán Kristjánsson (8 December 1982 – 28 February 2018) was an Icelandic chess grandmaster and professional poker player.

Stefán began playing chess at the age of 11 and earned his international master title in 2002, at age 19. He won the Reykjavík Chess Championship twice, in 2002 and 2006. He achieved the required norms for his grandmaster title by 2006 and was awarded the title in 2011, after reaching a rating of 2500. He represented Iceland at five Chess Olympiads and four European Team Chess Championships.

Stefán did not compete regularly after attaining his grandmaster title. Outside of chess, he was also a successful poker player and gained fame in the Icelandic poker community. He died in 2018 at the age of 35, becoming the first Icelandic grandmaster to die.

== Chess career ==
Stefán was born on 8 December 1982 in Reykjavík. He began playing chess at the relatively late age of 11, at his elementary school Melaskóli. He showed talent and progressed quickly. His attacking playstyle, strong personality and common refusal to accept draws in equal endgames led to elder members of the Reykjavík chess community giving him the affectionate nickname "Pönkið" ("Punk"). Stefán continued to improve: he won the Icelandic School Chess Championship in 2000, and earned his international master title in 2002, at the age of 19. International master and journalist Björn Thorfinnsson described him as the strongest of his age group. Also in 2002, he won the Reykjavík Chess Championship, a feat he repeated in 2006.

Stefán earned his first grandmaster (GM) norm at the Drammen International, held at the start of 2005, scoring 7/9. He earned his second and third GM norms in 2006. The former came at the April First Saturday GM tournament, which he won, scoring 8/11 (+5–0=6; 2609 PR). He achieved the latter at the 22nd European Club Cup in October, scoring 5/7. Stefán began to compete less regularly after this point as he focused on other pursuits, but he dedicated himself to improving his rating in order to attain the GM title. He was awarded the title by FIDE in October 2011, after reaching a rating of 2500. He was the twelfth Icelander to achieve the GM title.

From 2000 to 2008, Stefán competed in nine international competitions for Iceland: five times at the Chess Olympiad (2000, 2nd reserve board; 2002, reserve board; 2004, 2nd reserve board; 2006, reserve board; 2008, board 4) and four times at the European Team Chess Championship (2001, board 4; 2003, board 3; 2005, board 2; 2007, board 4). His overall Olympiad score was 23/41 (+18–13=10), and his overall European Team Championship score was 16½/32 (+11–10=11). Iceland's best Olympiad result with Stefán on the team was 22nd in 2002, and their best European Team Championship result was 20th in 2001 and 2007.

Stefán achieved a peak rating of 2503 in March 2014, and was the No. 10 ranked Icelandic player as of November 2017 with a rating of 2447.

=== Notable games ===
The following games are examples of Stefán defeating players with Elo ratings over 2600.

- Zbyněk Hráček vs. Stefán Kristjánsson, 1st Milk Masters (8 October 2002), French Defence: Winawer. Poisoned Pawn Variation General (C18), 0–1. Stefán defeats 2607-rated Hráček in 26 moves with the black pieces.
- Stefán Kristjánsson vs. Ivan Sokolov, European Club Cup (4 October 2007), Italian Game: Classical Variation. Giuoco Pianissimo (C53), 1–0. Stefán outplays 2666-rated Sokolov positionally, resulting in Sokolov's resignation after move 46.
- Stefán Kristjánsson vs. Radosław Wojtaszek, European Team Chess Championships (29 October 2007), Dutch Defence: Raphael Variation (A80), 1–0. Stefán capitalises on 2635-rated Wojtaszek's mistakes; Black resigns after 26 moves.

== Poker career ==
Stefán developed an interest in poker following its rise in popularity on television. He was best known as an online player, but he also competed on the European Poker Tour at the Scandinavian Open in 2009. Björn Thorfinnsson stated that Stefán's ability to calculate variations in chess translated well to poker, and helped him become a successful player. He earned enough through the game to buy an apartment without debt as well as a Lexus, and gained fame in the Icelandic poker community.

== Personal life and death ==
Stefán had two sisters, Lára Kristín and Anna Margrét, and a son (born 2003/2004). In May 2010, Stefán's mother suffered a debilitating brain injury in Vesturbær after failing off a bicycle which Stefán had bought for her, and thereafter required around-the-clock care. This event affected Stefán very badly and he developed a drug addiction. He squandered much of the money he had earned from poker due to the addiction, which he was unable to shake.

Stefán died on 28 February 2018, aged 35. The cause of death was not publicly announced. Vísir.is reported that Stefán's death was greatly mourned by the Icelandic chess community; Björn Þorfinnsson wrote that it will take a long time for Icelandic chess to recover.
