= McCorkle =

McCorkle is a surname or middle name. Notable people with the surname include:

- Michael McCorkle "Mac" Jones (born 1998), NFL quarterback
- Chantal McCorkle (born 1968), American fraudster; wife of William J. McCorkle
- David Porter McCorkle (fl.1862–1871), American military officer
- George McCorkle (1947–2007), American guitarist and songwriter
- Jill McCorkle (born 1958), American short story writer, novelist, and educator
- Joseph W. McCorkle (1819–1884), American politician
- Kelly McCorkle (born 1979), American beauty contest titleholder
- Margit L. McCorkle (born 1942), American-born Canadian musicologist, music bibliographer, editor, translator, pianist, and harpsichordist
- Mark McCorkle (born 1967), American screenwriter and producer
- Matt McCorkle (born ?), American sound artist, sound designer, and audio engineer
- Paul McCorkle (1863–1934), American politician and cotton broker
- Ruth McCorkle (1941–2019), American nursing professor, writer, researcher, and oncology pioneer
- Sam McCorkle (born 1949), American football coach
- Samuel Eusebius McCorkle (1746–1811), American pioneer Presbyterian preacher, teacher, and education advocate
- Sean McCorkle (born 1976), American mixed martial artist
- Susannah McCorkle (1946–2001), American jazz singer
- William J. McCorkle (born 1966), American fraudster; husband of Chantal McCorkle

== In fiction ==
- Will McCorkle, a character on American television show Party of Five (1994–2000)

== See also ==
- Doc Corkle (1952), an American television sitcom
