= McKeever =

McKeever is a Scottish and Irish surname. The name is derived from the Gaelic Mac Íomhair, meaning "‘son of Íomhar". The Gaelic personal name Íomhar is a form of the Old Norse personal name Ivarr. Similar surnames or variants are McIver, MacIver, McIvor and MacIvor. Native Gaelic surnames Mac Éibhir and Mac Éimhir also exist, and Flann Ó Riain, in his "What's That" column in The Irish Times, states that some Mac Íomhairs may originally have been Mac Éibhir.

== People ==
- Andrew Edward McKeever (1894-1919), Canadian military aviator
- Brian McKeever (born 1979), Canadian Paralympic skier
- Ian McKeever (artist) (born 1946), British artist
- Ian McKeever (mountaineer) (1970-2013), Irish mountaineer
- Robin McKeever (born 1973), Canadian Paralympic and Olympic skier
- Sean McKeever (born 1972), American comic book writer

== Ships ==
- USS Edward J. McKeever Jr. (SP-684), a United States Navy patrol vessel and minesweeper in commission from 1917 to 1919
- USS McKeever Brothers (SP-683), a United States Navy patrol vessel and minesweeper in commission from 1917 to 1919

== See also ==
- Mac Íomhair
- Ímar
- Uí Ímair
- Norse–Gaels
- McIver
