= Mac Torcaill =

Irish family name

- Mac Torcaill in a Gaelic type.
- Gender: Masculine
- Language: Manx, Irish

Other gender
- Feminine: Nic Thorcaill, Bean Mhic Thorcaill, Mhic Thorcaill

Origin
- Languages: Manx, Irish
- Meaning: "son of Torcall"

Other names
- Variant forms: Mac Thorcaill, Mac Thurcaill

Mac Torcaill is a masculine surname in the Manx language and Irish language . The name translates into English as "son of Torcall". The surname originated as a patronym, however it no longer refers to the actual name of the bearer's father. The form Nic Thorcaill is borne by unmarried females; the forms Bean Mhic Thorcaill and Mhic Thorcaill are borne by married females. Variant forms of Mac Torcaill are Mac Thorcaill and Mac Thurcaill; the feminine forms of these two names are Nic Thorcaill, Nic Thurcaill, Bean Mhic Thorcaill, Bean Mhic Thurcaill, Mhic Thorcaill, and Mhic Thurcaill. All these Irish surnames have various Anglicised forms.

== Etymology ==
Mac Torcaill translates into English as "son of Torcall". Variant forms of the surname include Mac Thorcaill, and Mac Thurcaill. These surnames originated as patronyms, however they no longer refer to the actual name of the bearer's father. The name Torcall is a Gaelic derivative of the Old Norse personal name Þórkell, which is a shortened form of Þorketill.

== Feminine forms ==
Mac Torcaill, Mac Thorcaill, and Mac Thurcaill are masculine surnames. The form of Mac Torcaill and Mac Thorcaill for unmarried females is Nic Thorcaill, whereas the feminine form of Mac Thurcaill is Nic Thurcaill; these names translate into English as "daughter of the son of Torcall. The forms of Mac Torcaill and Mac Thorcaill for married females is Bean Mhic Thorcaill, whereas the feminine form of Mac Thurcaill is Bean Mhic Thurcaill; these particular feminine names can also be rendered simply as Mhic Thorcaill and Mhic Thurcaill; these four surnames translate to "wife of the son of Torcall.

== Anglicised forms ==
Mac Torcaill has been Anglicised variously as Thurkell, Thurkill, Thirkell, and Thurkle. Mac Thorcaill and Mac Thurcaill has been Anglicised as MacCorkill, MacCorkell, MacCorrikle, MacCorkle, Corkey and Corkhill.

== Families ==
According to Patrick Woulfe, Irish families with the surname are probably of Scottish origin.
