= Torfinn =

Torfinn is a Norwegian male given name.

== Origin ==
The name Torfinn is derived from Old Norse Þórfinnr, which is composed of Þór (meaning thunder, also the name of the Nordic god of thunder Thor) and finnr, which refers to Finnish people. Thus it has been hypothesised to mean thunder of/to the Finns.

== Notable people ==
Notable people with this name include:

- Torfinn Bentzen (1912–1986), Norwegian jurist
- Torfinn Bjarkøy (1952-2022), Norwegian civil servant
- Torfinn Bjørnaas (1914-2009), Norwegian resistance member
- Torfinn Haukås (1931-1993), Norwegian novelist
- Torfinn Opheim (born 1961), Norwegian politician
- Torfinn Skard (1891-1970), Norwegian horticulturist

== See also ==
- Thorfinn (disambiguation)
- Torfin, Minnesota, United States
