= Thorfinnsson =

Thorfinnsson is an Icelandic patronymic surname. Notable people with the surname include:

- Björn Thorfinnsson (born 1979), Icelandic chess player and journalist
- Bragi Þorfinnsson (born 1981), Icelandic chess grandmaster
- Paul and Erlend Thorfinnsson; Paul (died after 1098) and Erlend (died 1098) ruled together as Earls of Orkney
- Snorri Thorfinnsson (born between 1005 and 1013), the first European to be born in North America
