= McGeever =

McGeever is a surname. Notable people with the surname include:

- Charlie McGeever (born 1961), Irish sportsperson
- John McGeever (1939–2022), American football player
- Kitty McGeever (1966–2015), English actress and comedian
- Ryan McGeever (born 1994), Scottish footballer

== See also ==
- McKeever
