= Gannon =

Gannon is an Irish surname, meaning "descendant of the fair one," perhaps denoting someone of Norse ancestry in Ireland. It may also derive from the Anglo-Saxon feminine name "Gunnhildr." Notable people with the surname include:

== Artists and entertainers ==
- Craig Gannon (born 1966), English guitarist
- Jeff Gannon (born 1957), pen name of James Guckert, a former White House reporter
- Kim Gannon (1900–1974), American songwriter
- Mary Gannon (1829—1868), American vaudeville and general comic actress associated with many of the 18th and 19th century matron roles

== Politicians ==
- Bob Gannon (1959–2017), American businessman and politician
- Tom Gannon (1943–2021), American politician

== Sportspeople ==
- Conor Gannon (born 2002), Irish tennis player
- Jim Gannon (born 1968), English football manager
- Jim Gannon (rugby league) (born 1977), Australian professional rugby league player
- Jonathan Gannon, American football coach
- Kelli Gannon (born 1978), former field hockey midfield player from the United States
- Rich Gannon (born 1965), National Football League quarterback
- Tim Gannon (born 1948), polo player, co-founder of Outback Steakhouse
- Terry Gannon (born 1963), sportscaster for ESPN on ABC and ESPN

== Others ==
- Bryant Illong Gannon (1912–1942), Australian private who was killed in the 1942 Dili massacre
- John D. Gannon (1948–1999, computer scientist, professor at the University of Maryland
- John Mark Gannon (1877–1968), former archbishop of the Diocese of Erie in Pennsylvania
- Kathy Gannon (born 1954), Canadian journalist
- Mary Gannon (1867–1932), co-founder of the architectural firm Gannon and Hands
- Theresa Gannon, British forensic psychologist

== See also ==
- Gannon University, university in Erie, Pennsylvania
- An early romanization/spelling error of Ganon, villain from Nintendo's video game series franchise The Legend of Zelda
