= MacIvor =

MacIvor, Macivor, and McIvor may refer to:

- McIvor (surname), the Irish and Scottish surnames MacIvor, Macivor, and McIvor
- Shire of McIvor, former shire located about 110 kilometres (68 mi) north of Melbourne, Victoria, Australia. Nowadays its territory is part of the City of Greater Bendigo and the shires of Strathbogie and Mitchell
- McIvor Highway, an Australian highway, linking Bendigo and Heathcote.
