= Earl Thorfinn =

Earl Thorfinn may refer to:

- Thorfinn Turf-Einarsson, Earl of Orkney (Thorfinn Skullsplitter)
- Thorfinn Sigurdsson, Earl of Orkney (Thorfinn the Mighty)
- MV Earl Thorfinn, a 1990 ferry in the Orkney Ferries fleet

== See also ==
- Thorfinn (disambiguation)
