= Peter DeTroy =

American lawyer

Peter DeTroy (April 13, 1948 – May 28, 2016) was an American defense attorney from Portland, Maine. He graduated from Bowdoin College in 1969 and then received his law degree from the University of Maine School of Law in 1972. DeTroy was a prominent defense attorney. He served on the Falmouth School Board. He was partner in the firm Norman, Hansen & DeTroy from 1984 until his death. DeTroy was named one of 50 difference-makers in Maine by Maine Magazine in 2013. DeTroy represented the famed defense attorney F. Lee Bailey, who was then a Maine resident, in his attempt to be able to practice law in the state after having been disbarred elsewhere.

DeTroy died from a heart attack while riding his bicycle near his home on Munjoy Hill in Portland.
