= King's Gold =

2003 novel by Glenn Macaskill

- Author: Glenn Macaskill
- Language: English
- Genre: Novel
- Publisher: Crest Publishing
- Publication date: 2003
- Publication place: South Africa
- Media type: Print (Paperback)
- Pages: 316 (first edition, paperback)
- ISBN: 0-620-31002-2 (first edition, paperback)
- OCLC: 156268556

King's Gold is a novel by South African author Glenn Macaskill, published in 2003 by Crest Publishing.

== Contents ==
It contains graphic (though fictional) references to the Gukurahundi, the occupation of Matabeleland by Zimbabwe's Fifth Brigade in the 1980s. The majority of the book is centred on two main plotlines: The political efforts of the Zimbabwe African People's Union, and the discovery and subsequent extraction of an ancient treasure, a solid gold bird statue created at the whim of King Mzilikazi some 180 years before.
