= Torquil =

- Gender: Masculine
- Language: English

Origin
- Languages: 1. Scottish Gaelic, from Old Norse; 2. Norwegian, Swedish, from Old Norse
- Origin: 1. SG Torcall, from ON Þorketill; 2. Nr, Sw Torkel, from ON Þorketill
- Derivation: ON Þorr + ketill
- Meaning: "Thor" + "(sacrificial) cauldron"

Other names
- Cognates: 2. Thorkel; Torkil; Torkild; Torkjell

Torquil is an Anglicised form of the Norwegian and Swedish masculine name Torkel, and the Scottish Gaelic name Torcall. The Scottish Gaelic name Torcall is a Gaelicised form of the Old Norse name Þorkell. The Scandinavian Torkel is a contracted form of the Old Norse Þorkell, made up of the two elements: Þór, meaning "Thor" the Norse god of thunder; and kell (in some variants ketill), meaning "(sacrificial) cauldron".

A variant spelling of the Scottish Gaelic Torcall is Torcull. A similar Scottish Gaelic given name is Torcadall, which is also Anglicised as Torquil.

== Torquil ==
- Torquil (priest), Archdeacon of Dublin in 1180
- Torquil Campbell (born 1972), Canadian musician
- Torquil MacLeod (fl. 14th century), Scottish clan chief
- Torquil MacLeod (clan chief) (fl. c. 1500), Chief of Clan MacLeod of Lewis
- Torquil MacNeill, Scottish 16th century clan chief
- Torquil Mathewson, Scottish rugby union player
- Torquil Neilson, Australian actor
- Torquil Norman (1933–2025), British businessman and philanthropist
- Torquil Riley-Smith (born 1962), British radio executive

== Torquhil ==
- Torquhil Campbell, 13th Duke of Argyll (born 1968), Scottish peer
- Torquhil Matheson (1871–1963), senior British Army officer of the First World War

== Torcuil ==
- Torcuil Crichton (born 1964), Scottish politician

== See also ==
- Mac Torcaill
