= MacAskill =

MacAskill, also spelt Macaskill, MacCaskill, McAskill, McCaskill and McCaskell is a surname. It is an Anglicisation of the Scottish Gaelic Mac Asgaill, meaning "son of Asgall". The Gaelic name Asgall is a reduced form of the Old Norse personal name Ásketill, son of Torquil. Asketil was the last Viking King of Dublin, Ireland. He died circa 1171–2, resisting the English invaders of Ireland under King Henry II. He had placed his family under the protection of the Norse King of Man, and his grandson, Gilbert MacAsgaill, led a party sent by the King of Man to occupy and hold Dunscaith Castle, on the Sleat Peninsula, Isle of Skye. These are the first members of the name we can find in Scotland. The name is borne by a noted family on Skye, the MacAskills of Rubha an Dùnain, who historically followed the MacLeods of Dunvegan, possibly serving them as early as the fourteenth century (although documentation is lacking). In Gaelic the MacAskills are known as Clann t-Ascaill, and Clann t-Asgaill. In Scottish Gaelic, the surname is rendered MacAsgaill. In Irish, the surname is rendered Mac Ascaill. Early forms of the name on record in Scotland are Mackaiscail (in 1766), Mackaiscal (in 1769), and Macaiskill (in 1790). An early form of the name in England is Mac A skil (in 1311).

Notable persons with the name include:

- Angus MacAskill (1825–1863), Scottish born Canadian giant Gael, the tallest non-pathological giant and the strongest man who ever lived according to the Guinness book of world records
- Claire McCaskill (born 1953), American politician from Missouri
- Danny MacAskill (born 1985), Scottish stunt cyclist
- Stephen McCaskell (born 1989), Documentary filmmaker
- Dianne Macaskill, New Zealand archivist
- Glenn Macaskill, Zimbabwean-South African writer
- Ishbel MacAskill (1941–2011), Scottish singer
- J. D. McAskill (1907–1994), Canadian educator and politician
- Kenny MacAskill (born 1958), Scottish politician
- Klara MacAskill (born 1964), Hungarian-Canadian sprint canoer
- Ewen MacAskill (born 1952), Scottish journalist
- William MacAskill (born 1987), Scottish philosopher and author
- W. R. Macaskill (1887–1956), Canadian photographer

== See also ==
- MacAskills Lake, Inverness County, Nova Scotia, Canada
- McCaskill (disambiguation)
