= Crellin =

Crellin is a surname of Manx origin. It is a variant of Crennall, which is an Anglicized version of the Gaelic patronym Mac Raghnaill (son of Raghnall). Raghnall derives from the Old Norse name Rogvaldr (ruler of the gods). Notable people with the surname include:

- Benjamin Crellin, New Zealand comedian, actor and writer;
- Bertie Crellin (1902–1993), Australian rules footballer;
- Billy Crellin (born 2000), British footballer;
- David Crellin (born 1961), British actor;
- Jeffrey Crellin, Australian oboist;
- John Crellin (1899–1981), Manx politician;
- Lewis Crellin (1901–1990), Manx scholar;
- Max Crellin (1933–2020), Australian politician;
- Rachel Crellin, Manx archaeologist.

== See also ==
- Crellin, Maryland
