= F. Lee Bailey =

American criminal defense attorney (1933–2021)

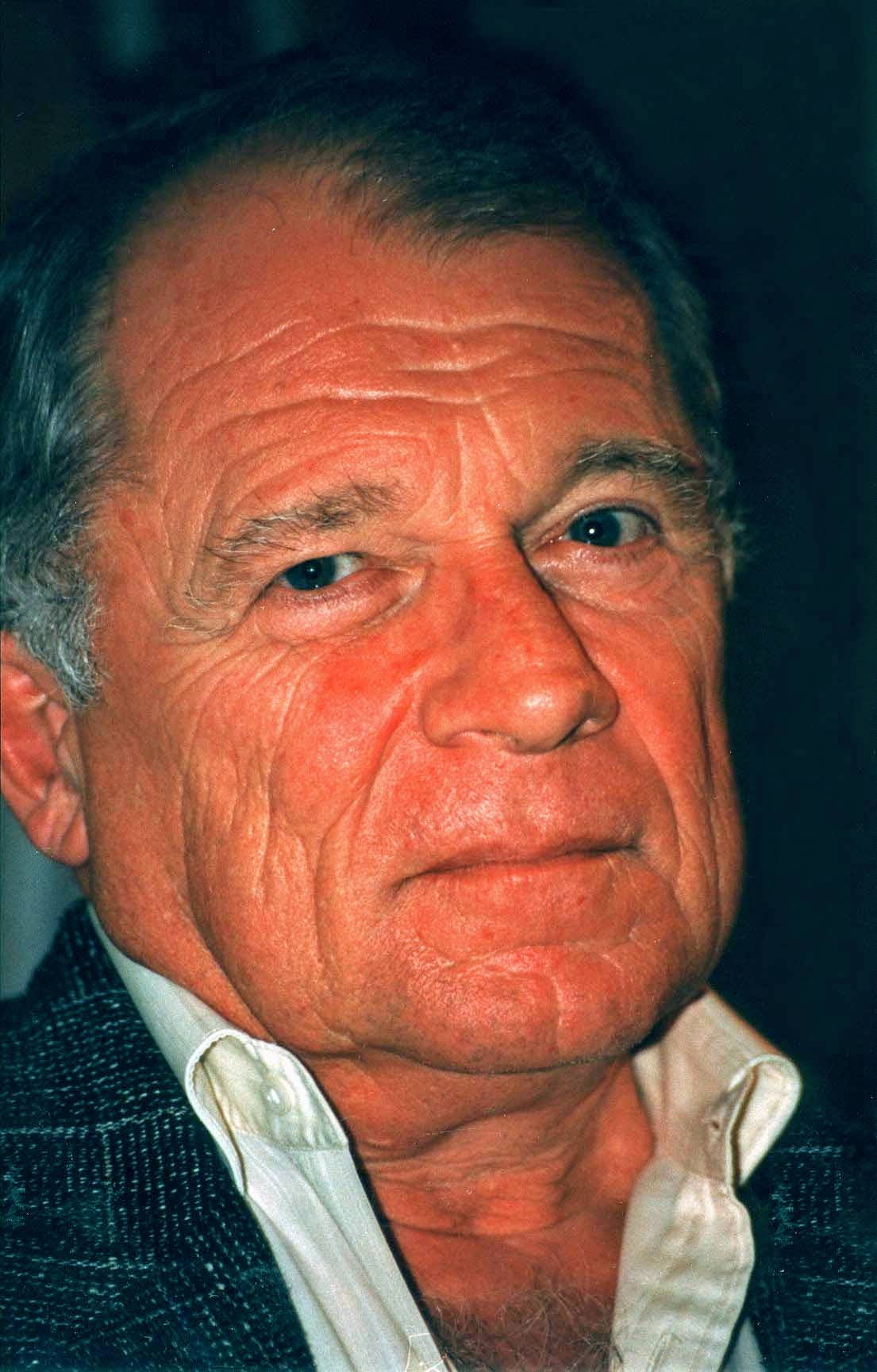
- Bailey in 1993
- Born: Francis Lee Bailey Jr. June 10, 1933; Waltham, Massachusetts, U.S.
- Died: June 3, 2021 (aged 87); Atlanta, Georgia, U.S.
- Education: Harvard University (attended); Boston University (LLB)
- Spouses: Florence Gott (m. 1960; div. 1961); Froma Portney (div. 1972); Lynda Hart (m. 1972; div. 1980); Patricia Shiers (m. 1985; died 1999)
- Children: 3
- Military career
- Branch: United States Navy; United States Marine Corps
- Service years: 1952–1956
- Rank: Second Lieutenant
- Units: VMFA-334; MAG-32

Francis Lee Bailey Jr. (June 10, 1933 – June 3, 2021) was an American criminal defense attorney and author of The Defense Never Rests.

Born in Waltham, Massachusetts, Bailey first came to nationwide attention for his involvement in the second murder trial of Sam Sheppard, a surgeon accused of murdering his wife. He later served as the attorney in a number of other high-profile cases, such as Albert DeSalvo, a suspect in the "Boston Strangler" murders, heiress Patty Hearst's trial for bank robberies committed during her involvement with the Symbionese Liberation Army, and U.S. Army Captain Ernest Medina for the My Lai Massacre. He was a member of the "Dream Team" in the trial of former football player O. J. Simpson, who was accused of murdering Nicole Brown Simpson and Ron Goldman. He is considered one of the greatest lawyers of the 20th century.

For most of his career, Bailey was licensed in Florida and in Massachusetts, where he was respectively disbarred in 2001 and 2003 for misconduct while defending Claude Louis DuBoc, who had been accused of trafficking marijuana. Following his disbarment, he moved to Maine, where he ran a consulting firm. He later sat for the bar exam in the state of Maine. In 2013, he was denied a law license by the Maine Board of Bar Examiners, a decision Bailey appealed that same year where the appellate court overturned the initial license denial. The Board of Examiners appealed the appellate court decision, and in 2014 the original denial was upheld by the Maine Supreme Judicial Court.

== Early life ==
Bailey was born June 10, 1933, in Waltham, Massachusetts. His mother, Grace (Mitchell), was a teacher and nursery school director, and his father, Francis Lee Bailey Sr., was an advertising salesman. His parents divorced when he was ten. Bailey attended Cardigan Mountain School and then Kimball Union Academy, where he graduated in 1950. He studied at Harvard College but dropped out in 1952 to join the United States Navy and later transferred to the Marine Corps. He was commissioned as an officer and, following flight training, received his naval aviator wings in 1954. He served as a jet fighter pilot, and then began to serve as a squadron legal officer at Cherry Point, North Carolina.

He briefly returned to Harvard before being admitted to Boston University School of Law in 1957, which accepted his military experience in lieu of the requirement for students to have completed at least three years of undergraduate college courses. While attending Boston University, he achieved the highest grade point average in the school's history. He graduated with an LL.B. in 1960 and was ranked first in his class.

== Notable cases ==
=== Sam Sheppard ===
In 1954, Sam Sheppard was found guilty in the murder of his wife Marilyn in a case that was one of the inspirations for the television series The Fugitive (1963–1967). In the 1960s, Bailey, at the time a resident of Rocky River, Ohio, was hired by Sheppard's brother Stephen to help in Sheppard's appeal. In 1966, Bailey successfully argued before the U.S. Supreme Court that Sheppard had been denied due process, winning a re-trial. A not guilty verdict followed. This case established Bailey's reputation as a skilled defense attorney and was the first of many high-profile cases.

=== "Boston Strangler" ===
In 1964, Bailey defended Albert DeSalvo for a series of sexual assaults known as the "Green Man" or "Measuring Man" incidents. Bailey later said that DeSalvo confessed that he had also committed the "Boston Strangler" murders. DeSalvo was found guilty of the assaults, but was never tried for the murders.

=== Carl A. Coppolino ===
Carl A. Coppolino was accused of the July 30, 1963, murder of retired Army Col. William Farber, his neighbor and the husband of Marjorie Farber, with whom Coppolino was having an affair. He was also accused of the August 28, 1965, murder of his wife, Carmela Coppolino. The prosecution claimed that Coppolino injected his victims with a paralyzing drug called succinylcholine chloride, which at the time was undetectable due to limited forensic technology. Bailey successfully defended Coppolino in the New Jersey case over the death of Farber in December 1966. However, Coppolino was convicted of murdering his wife in Florida. He was paroled after serving 12 years of his sentence.

=== George Edgerly ===
Bailey attended Keeler Polygraph Institute in Chicago, where he became an expert in lie detector tests. It was in this capacity that he was enlisted by the defense in the case of George Edgerly, a mechanic charged with murdering his wife. When Edgerly's attorney was incapacitated by a heart attack, Bailey took over the defense. Edgerly—whose story was one of several that served as the basis for the television series and film The Fugitive—was acquitted. He was later convicted of a series of other crimes, including the murder of General Motors representative Frank Smith in 1974 and a rape which took place in 1975.

=== Ernest Medina ===
Bailey successfully defended U.S. Army Captain Ernest Medina in his 1971 court-martial for responsibility in the My Lai Massacre during the Vietnam War. Medina was court-martialed for allegedly allowing the men in the company he commanded to murder My Lai non-combatants. Medina claimed that he never gave orders to kill non-combatants, and that his men killed non-combatants of their own volition. Medina also testified that he was unable to stop the massacre because he did not become aware of it until it was too late. Medina additionally denied personally killing any Vietnamese non-combatants at My Lai, with the exception of a young woman whom two soldiers testified that they had found hiding in a ditch. When she emerged with her hands held up, Medina shot her because, as he claimed at his court-martial, he thought she had a grenade. Medina was acquitted, and subsequently left the Army. He later worked at an Enstrom Helicopter Corporation plant in which Bailey had an ownership stake.

=== Patricia Hearst ===
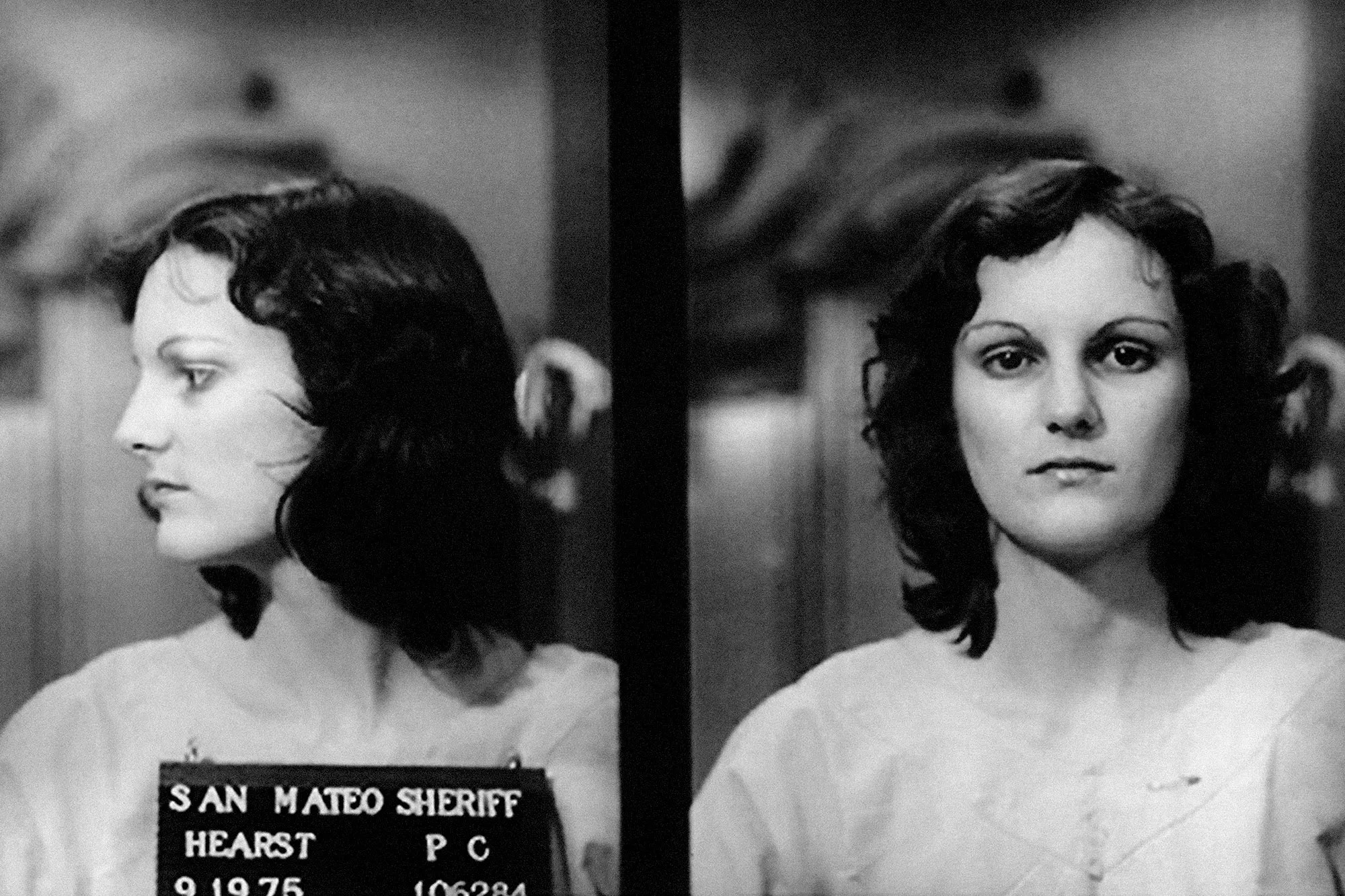
Patty Hearst mugshot

The prosecution of Patty Hearst, a newspaper heiress who had committed armed bank robberies after being kidnapped by the Symbionese Liberation Army (SLA), was one of Bailey's defeats. In her autobiography, Hearst described his closing argument as "disjointed" and said that she suspected he had been drinking. During his closing argument, Bailey spilled a glass of water on his pants. Hearst was convicted and sentenced to seven years in prison. She served 22 months before her sentence was commuted by President Jimmy Carter in 1977. She was pardoned by President Bill Clinton in 2001.

While Hearst was convicted at trial, Bailey did protect her from a further death-penalty prosecution. On April 28, 1975, members of the SLA had robbed a Crocker Bank branch in Carmichael, California. Hearst drove one of the getaway cars. A customer was killed when one of the robbers' gun discharged. The Symbionese Liberation Army members participating in the robbery were therefore subject to the death penalty under the felony murder rule. Bailey negotiated with prosecutors for Hearst to receive use immunity in exchange for her testimony about the Carmichael robbery, thus protecting her from a possible death sentence.

=== As criminal defendant ===
A 1982 case found Bailey in the role of criminal defendant rather than defense attorney. The case was itself considered notable as one of the longest running drunk driving cases in California history. Bailey was acquitted but may have faced legal defense bills of $100,000 along with a $50 fine for the lesser infraction of running a stop sign. He claimed that, despite the high cost of his defense, he wanted to fight the case not only for himself but for the "little man" who might not be able to afford such high legal costs. He also claimed that, despite Hearst's accusations to the contrary, he did not have a drinking problem when it came to defending clients. One member of Bailey's defense team, Robert Shapiro, went on to work with Bailey on the defense of O.J. Simpson.

=== Claude DuBoc ===
In 1994, while the O. J. Simpson case was being tried, Bailey and Robert Shapiro represented Claude DuBoc, who in that case was found guilty of the drug trafficking of marijuana. In a plea bargain agreement with the U.S. Attorney, DuBoc agreed to turn over his assets to the U.S. government. These included a large block of stock in BioChem, worth approximately $6 million at the time of the plea deal. When the government sought to collect the stock, it had increased in value to $20 million. Bailey said he was entitled to the appreciation in payment of his legal fees. Since he had used the stock as collateral for loans, he was unable to turn over the stock to the government. In 1996, Bailey was sent to prison for contempt. After 44 days at the Federal Correctional Institution, Tallahassee, Bailey's brother succeeded in raising the money to enable him to return the stock, and he was freed.

=== O. J. Simpson ===
Bailey joined the O. J. Simpson defense team just before the preliminary hearing. Bailey held numerous press conferences to discuss the progress of the case. In a press conference prior to his cross-examination of Mark Fuhrman, Bailey said, "Any lawyer in his right mind who would not be looking forward to cross-examining Mark Fuhrman is an idiot." His famous cross-examination of Fuhrman is considered to be the key to Simpson's acquittal. In front of a predominantly Black jury, Bailey got Fuhrman to claim, "Marine to Marine", he never used the word nigger to describe Blacks at any time during the previous 10 years, a claim the defense team later found evidence to refute. Ultimately, the statement that Bailey drew from the detective forced Fuhrman to plead the Fifth in his next courtroom appearance. Bailey also attracted minor attention for keeping a silver flask on the defense table, which fellow defense attorney Robert Kardashian claimed contained only coffee.

Bailey published a book about the Simpson trial shortly before his death, titled The Truth About the O.J. Simpson Trial: By the Architect of the Defense.

=== William and Chantal McCorkle ===
British citizen Chantal McCorkle, along with her American husband William, were tried and convicted in 1998 in Florida for her part in a financial fraud. The McCorkles sold kits, advertised in infomercials, purporting to show buyers how to get rich by buying property in foreclosures and government auctions. Among the grounds for their conviction was their representation in the infomercials that they owned luxury automobiles and airplanes (actually rented for the commercials), and their use of purported testimonials from satisfied customers, who were actually paid actors.

Chantal, represented by Mark Horwitz, and her husband, represented by Bailey, were each originally sentenced to over 24 years in federal prison under mandatory sentencing laws. After two appeals, the McCorkles' sentences were reduced in 2006 to 18 years.

=== Korean Air Lines Flight 007 ===
A strike to Bailey's credibility came when he took on the case of aggrieved families of passengers on Korean Air Lines Flight 007, which was shot down over the Soviet Union in 1983. Though he made several public statements attesting to his commitment to the case, his law firm put in a much smaller number of hours on the case than did the two other law firms working on it. He aggravated other clients by traveling to Libya to discuss defending two men who were charged with blowing up Pan Am Flight 103 over Lockerbie, Scotland, even after undertaking the cause of the relatives of that bombing's victims. To the latter, the expedition to Tripoli was a clear conflict of interest; Bailey denied that he intended to defend the Libyans, though a letter he had written to the U.S. Government suggested otherwise.

=== Koscot Interplanetary ===
Koscot Interplanetary and Dare to be Great were multi-level marketing companies owned by Glenn W. Turner. In 1973, Turner, Bailey and eight others were indicted by a federal grand jury on conspiracy and mail fraud charges. The indictment said that Bailey had appeared in a film made for Turner's organization and had appeared with Turner at several rallies. A nine-month trial ended in a hung jury. Charges were then dropped against Bailey. In 1975, Turner pleaded guilty to a single misdemeanor charge of violating securities laws and was given probation.

=== "Paul is dead" ===
Bailey was featured in an RKO television special in which he conducted a mock trial, examining various expert witnesses on the subject of the "Paul is dead" rumor referring to Beatle Paul McCartney. One of the experts was Fred LaBour, whose article in The Michigan Daily had been instrumental in the spread of the urban legend. LaBour told Bailey during a pre-show meeting he had made up the whole thing. Bailey responded, "Well, we have an hour of television to do. You're going to have to go along with this." The program aired locally in New York City on November 30, 1969, and was never re-aired.

== Television career ==
In 1967, Bailey became host of the short-lived ABC television series Good Company, a series in which he would interview celebrities in their homes in a format similar to Edward R. Murrow's Person to Person. In April 1968 he appeared in a CBS news special, The Trial Lawyer, alongside his fellow lawyers Melvin Belli, Percy Foreman, and Edward Bennett Williams, where they discussed the merits and demerits of trial by jury. In 1983, Bailey again became a television host, when he was named the host of a short-lived syndicated television show called Lie Detector. Guests were questioned by Bailey and were then submitted to a polygraph test.

== Personal legal issues and professional status ==
=== Drunk driving case ===
On February 28, 1982, Bailey was arrested for drunk driving in California. He was acquitted, thanks in large part to the defense conducted by Robert Shapiro, who employed Bailey on the O. J. Simpson criminal defense team 12 years later. The drunk driving trial so enraged Bailey that he wrote a book, How to Protect Yourself Against Cops in California and Other Strange Places, which alleged serious abuses by police and argued that driving under the influence of alcohol had become "a number, not a condition". He furthermore asserted that political pressure had motivated police to go after celebrities in particular.

=== Disbarment ===
Bailey's high public profile came both as a result of the cases he took on and his own actions. In 2001, he was disbarred in the state of Florida, with reciprocal disbarment in Massachusetts on April 11, 2003. The Florida disbarment was the result of his handling of shares in a pharmaceutical company named Biochem Pharma during his representation of marijuana trafficker Claude DuBoc. Bailey had transferred a large portion of DuBoc's assets into his own accounts. Among these assets was a stock valued at about $5.9 million, which was supposed to be included in the forfeiture of assets that DuBoc made as part of a plea bargain.

The stock had been held by Bailey because it would be sold immediately if it came into government possession, but it was expected to rise dramatically in value. Bailey later refused to turn it over, saying that it was payment of his legal fees and not part of DuBoc's asset forfeiture. In addition, Bailey said that the stock was collateral for loans that he had received, and so could not be sold until the loans were repaid.

Bailey's defense of his actions was rejected by the court; the stock rose in value to about $20 million, and Bailey then argued that, if he turned over the stock so that it could be sold, he was entitled to keep the difference between what it was valued at when he received it and its new, higher price. After Bailey was imprisoned for six weeks in 1996 for contempt of court, his brother raised the money that enabled Bailey to turn the stock over to the government, and he was released. He was later found guilty of seven counts of attorney misconduct by the Florida Supreme Court, and in 2001 he was disbarred. Massachusetts disbarred Bailey two years later.

In early 2003, a judge ordered Bailey to pay $5 million in taxes and penalties on income connected with the Duboc case. The judge later reversed the decision, although Bailey still had an unpaid tax bill of nearly $2 million, which he disputed. In March 2005, Bailey filed to regain his law license in Massachusetts but failed.

=== Application to practice law in Maine ===
In 2009, Bailey moved to Yarmouth, Maine, where he was a partner in the Bailey & Elliott consulting business with his girlfriend Debbie Elliott. In 2012, Bailey passed the Maine bar examination and applied for a law license; the Maine Board of Bar Examiners voted 5–4 to deny his application. The majority said Bailey had not proved by "clear and convincing evidence that he possesses the requisite honesty and integrity" to practice law. Bailey appealed, petitioning the Maine Supreme Judicial Court to review the denial. In March 2013, a two-day hearing was held by Supreme Judicial Court Justice Donald G. Alexander in which Bailey's suitability to practice law was examined. Justice Alexander filed a 57-page ruling on April 19, 2013, stating that Bailey "was almost fit to practice law, except for an outstanding tax debt of nearly $2 million". Bailey was allowed to move for reconsideration of the decision "if [he] offer[ed] a plan to repay the nearly $2 million he owes in back taxes to the federal government". Initially, the government had claimed that Bailey owed $4 million in back taxes. However, representing himself before the tax court, Bailey was successful in having the amount owed reduced to $2 million.

In June 2013, Bailey's attorney, Peter DeTroy, filed a motion for reconsideration of the decision. After oral arguments were heard on the reconsideration, Justice Alexander granted the motion, stating that "[a] general survey of the state precedent on the debt payment issue suggests that the existence of a debt, by itself, may not result in a finding of lack of good moral character .... Rather, findings of failure of proof of good moral character tend to be based on misconduct regarding effort—or lack of effort—to pay the debt, or misconduct referencing the debt payment obligation in the bar admission process." This cleared the way for Bailey to obtain a Maine law license. However, Maine's Board of Bar Examiners appealed Justice Alexander's decision to the entire Supreme Court, minus Alexander.

On April 10, 2014, the Maine Supreme Court voted 4-to-2 to side with the Bar Examiners and reverse Justice Alexander's decision, which continued to prevent Bailey from practicing law in Maine.

In 2016, Bailey lived in Maine and operated the Bailey & Elliott consulting business.

== Personal life ==
Bailey was married four times. His first marriage, to Florence Gott, ended in divorce in 1961; his second marriage, to Froma Portley, lasted until their divorce in 1972; his third marriage, to Lynda Hart, lasted from 1972 until their divorce in 1980; and his fourth marriage, to Patricia Shiers, lasted from 1985 until her death in 1999. He had two sons from his first marriage and another son from his second marriage.

== Death ==
In approximately 2019, in his mid 80s and in the final years of his life, Bailey moved to Georgia to be near to his son Scott, who had assisted Bailey in several of his business ventures over the years. After a period of ill health, he died of an unspecified cause in a hospice center in Atlanta on June 3, 2021, just one week prior to his 88th birthday. He was buried at the Georgia National Cemetery, a veterans cemetery in Canton, Georgia. His epitaph reads "The defense never rests."

== In popular culture ==
Bailey was portrayed by Nathan Lane in the 2016 miniseries The People v. O. J. Simpson: American Crime Story.

In Ezra Edelman's 2016 documentary O.J.: Made in America, Bailey is featured heavily through interviews and archive footage of the Simpson murder trial, particularly his cross-examination of Mark Fuhrman. In his interview, Bailey continued to assert that Fuhrman deliberately planted the incriminating glove on Simpson's estate in an attempt to frame him. When asked by Edelman what motive Fuhrman would have, Bailey responded that Simpson had married a white woman, which he described as "a capital offense in Fuhrman's eyes".

Bailey is portrayed by Luke Kirby in the 2023 film Boston Strangler.

== Publications ==
Non-fiction

- Aronson, Harvey (Co-author) (1971). The Defense Never Rests. Stein and Day. ISBN 0-8128-1441-X.
- For the Defense. Atheneum. 1975. ISBN 0-689-10667-X.
- Greeya, John (Co-author) (1977). Cleared for the Approach: In Defense of Flying. Prentice Hall. ISBN 0-13-136663-7.
- How to Protect Yourself Against Cops in California and Other Strange Places. Stein & Day. 1982. ISBN 0-8128-2891-7.
- Rabe, Jean (Co-author) (2008). When the Husband is the Suspect: From Sam Shepperd to Scott Peterson – The Public's Passion for Spousal Homicide. Forge Books. ISBN 978-0765355232.
- Rabe, Jean (Co-author) (2013). Excellence in Cross-Examination. Thomson West.
- Sisson, Jennifer (Co-author) (2021). The Truth about the O. J. Simpson Trial: By the Architect of the Defense. Skyhorse. ISBN 978-1510765849.

Fiction

- Secrets. Stein & Day. 1978. ISBN 978-0812825275.

Magazine

- Gallery, publisher (1972). (In October 1972, Bailey became "the showcase publisher of Gallery", a new magazine based on Playboy and Penthouse, but later dropped out as publisher.)
