= Rubha an Dùnain =

Peninsula in Scotland

- Peninsula
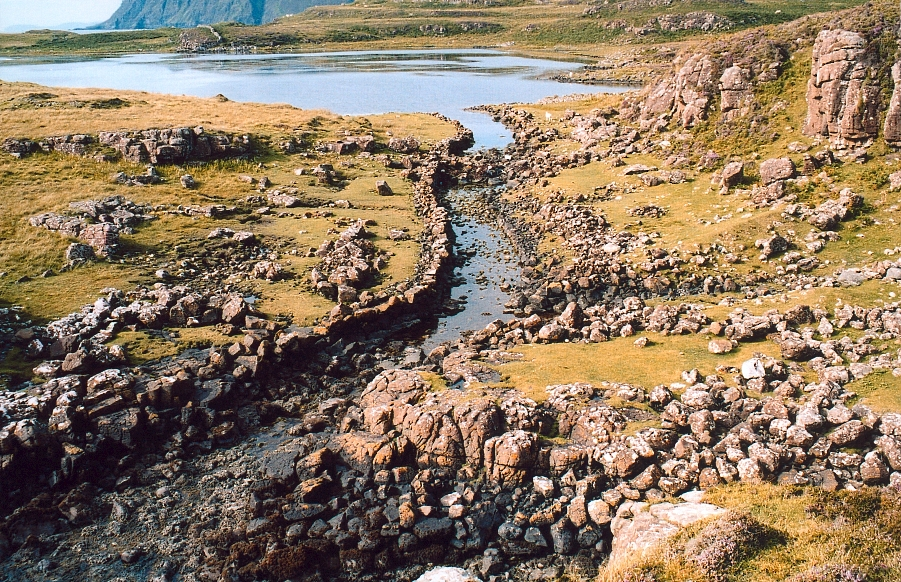
- The Viking Canal leaving Loch na h-Àirde

- Location within Highland
- Coordinates: 57.161°N 6.316°W
- Grid position: NG391161
- Location: Skye, Scotland

Rubha an Dùnain or Rubh' an Dùnain (Scottish Gaelic pronunciation: [ᵲu(.ə) ən t̪uːnən]) is an uninhabited peninsula to the south of the Cuillin hills on the Isle of Skye in Scotland. It contains unique archaeological sites which in 2017 were designated as a historic monument of national importance by Historic Environment Scotland.

This headland rises to over 30 metres (100 feet) above sea level. Loch na h-Àirde (Scottish Gaelic pronunciation: [ɫ̪ɔx nə haːɾʃtʲə]) is a body of water that is situated to the east of the peninsula close to the sea shore. To its north is Camas a' Mhùrain (bay of the marram grass).

The peninsula contains archaeological sites dating from the Mesolithic period onwards. Its name means "point of the little fort", referencing a prehistoric dun situated south of the loch.

== Prehistoric remains ==
To the north are the remains of prehistoric settlements dating from the Mesolithic (a small rock shelter), a chambered cairn from the 2nd or 3rd millennium BC and a passage grave. A dun to the south of the loch is likely to be of Iron Age provenance.

== Loch na h-Àirde ==
It had been known for some time that an artificial "canal" reputedly of Viking origin had been constructed at some point in the past along the length of the stream that runs from the loch to the sea. In 2000 a local archaeologist discovered in the loch a boat timber from a Norse-style clinker-built faering subsequently carbon dated to AD 1100. In May 2009 an archaeological study sponsored by Historic Scotland identified stone-built quays and a system to maintain a constant water level in the loch. The "canal" allowed for boats such as birlinns to exit at high tide. Historic Environment Scotland (HES) lists the site as a "rare medieval harbour complex, with docks, boat noosts, canal, quays and associated loch shore and bed in which boat fragments are likely to survive."

HES adds: "No close parallels for this site have been identified that have a similar degree of time depth and complexity of development.”

It is now believed that the loch was an important site for maritime activity for many centuries, spanning the Viking and later periods of Scottish clan rule.

In 2011 the Royal Commission on Ancient & Historical Monuments of Scotland RCAHMS (now merged with Historic Scotland as HES) launched air surveys in the hope of discovering additional artefacts. Marine archaeologist Dr Colin Martin stated: "This site has enormous potential to tell us about how boats were built, serviced and sailed on Scotland's western seaboard in the medieval period – and perhaps during the early historic and prehistoric eras as well... There is no other site quite like this in Scotland." Dr Martin's summary report "A Highway into History" is available to download on the independent website dedicated to the peninsula – Skye's Hidden Heritage.

== Later occupation ==
In the post-Viking era Rubha an Dùnain was the hereditary homeland of the clan MacAskill, a sept of Clan McLeod, for whom they were coast-watchers and bodyguards. The peninsula contains the ruins of a farming community, including an 18th-century tacksman's house. At its zenith during the early years of the 19th century, the Rubha an Dùnain farm extended to 37,500 acres (15,200 hectares) and directly supported 70 men and scores of families. The area was occupied until the clearances when many of the clan leaders emigrated to the US and New Zealand and Cape Breton, Nova Scotia, Canada. There is no reference to any occupants after the census of 1861.
