= Kelie McIver =

American actress

- Kelie McIver in The Imaginary Invalid
- Born: Topeka, Kansas

Kelie McIver is a Kansas-born actress and singer who has played classical stage roles such as Lady Macbeth and Nurse in Romeo & Juliet for Kingsmen Shakespeare Festival, Viola in Twelfth Night for both Nevada Shakespeare in the Park and Shakespeare at Play, Hecuba in The Trojan Women, Kate in Taming of the Shrew, Rosalind in As You Like It, Doll Common in Mark Ringer's production of The Alchemist and as both Puck and Titania in separate productions of A Midsummer Night's Dream. She has also appeared in roles in non-classical plays such as Ravenscroft, Train of Thought, The Matchmaker, Madwoman of Chaillot, and Jon Mullich's adaptation of A Servant of Two Masters. McIver is a frequent performer at the Golden Raspberry Awards (RAZZIES) ceremony and has toured with the country music trio Mama Says! with Janet Fisher and Patti Shannon. She is a former president and long standing board member of the Midwest Entertainment Connection (MECONN), a nonprofit organization that connects the entertainment industries of Los Angeles and the Midwest. Her film appearances include the award-winning short film Trail End opposite Barry Corbin and the 2009 feature film Table for Three.
