= Thorfinn =

Thorfinn (Þorfinnr) is a Scandinavian name, which originally referred to the god Thor and the nomadic mobile lifestyles of the native indigenous peoples of northern Scandinavia. This name survived into Christian times. Notable people with the name include:

- Thorfinn Torf-Einarsson (died c. 963), Earl of Orkney the blue
- Thorfinn Karlsefni (fl. 1010), Icelandic explorer
- Thorfinn the Mighty or Thorfinn Sigurdsson (1009?–c. 1065), Earl of Orkney
- Thorfinn of Hamar (died 1285), Christian bishop and saint
- Thorfinn (Vinland Saga), a fictional character from the manga series Vinland Saga based on Thorfinn Karlsefni
- Thorfinn, a fictional character from the CBS series Ghosts

== See also ==
- Torfinn, a related modern name
- Thorfinnsson
- Earl Thorfinn (disambiguation)
