= Turpin =

Turpin is a first name and surname of French and English origin. The name comes from the Old Norse name Thórfinnr (composed of the elements Thórr the name of the god of thunder, and the ethnic name Finnr ‘wanderer’). It may refer to:

== People ==
=== Given name ===
- Tilpin, a name later corrupted as Turpin, Roman Catholic bishop in 8th-century France
- Turpin of Brechin, 12th-century bishop of Brechin, Scotland
- Turpin Bannister (1904–1982), American architectural historian and academic

=== Surname ===
- Barbara Turpin, American atmospheric scientist
- Ben Turpin (1869–1940), American comedian
- Charles Murray Turpin (1878–1946), member of the U.S. House of Representatives from Pennsylvania
- Clément Turpin (born 1982), French football referee
- David and Louise Turpin, an American couple arrested in 2018 for child abuse
- David H. Turpin (born 1956), Canadian academic
- Dick Turpin (died 1739), English highwayman
- Dick Turpin (boxer) (1920–1990), English boxer
- Dominique Turpin (born 1957); French/Swiss academic
- Edmund Hart Turpin (1835–1907), British organist, composer and choir leader
- Esther Turpin (born 1996), French heptathlete
- Eugène Turpin (1848–1927), French chemist
- François Henri Turpin (1709–1799), French writer
- Franck Turpin (born 1977), French footballer
- George Turpin (born 1952), English boxer and 1972 Olympic bronze medalist
- J. Clifford Turpin (1886–1966), early American aviator
- James Turpin (organist) (1840–1896), British organist, composer and teacher
- James H. Turpin (1846–1893), U.S. Army first sergeant and Medal of Honor recipient
- James Wesley Turpin (born 1928), founder of Project Concern International, advocate for wrongful life tort law
- Joe Turpin, Canadian soccer player
- John Henry Turpin (1876–1962), one of the first African-American chief petty officers in the U.S. Navy
- KaVontae Turpin (born 1996), American football player
- Kenneth Turpin (1915–2005), English historian, Vice-Chancellor of the University of Oxford
- Louis Washington Turpin (1849–1903), United States congressman from Alabama
- Ludovic Turpin (born 1975), French professional road racing cyclist
- Melvin Turpin (1960–2010), American basketball player
- Miles Turpin, National Football League player
- Najai Turpin (1981–2005), American boxer
- Pierre Jean François Turpin (1775–1840), French botanist
- Randy Turpin (1928–1966), English boxer
- Tom Turpin (1871–1922), American ragtime composer
- Waters Edward Turpin (1910–1968), American novelist, professor

== Fictional characters ==
- Turpin, in the novel The Three Hostages by Scottish author John Buchan
- Betty Turpin (later Williams), fictional character in the British soap opera Coronation Street
- Cyril Turpin, fictional character in the British soap opera Coronation Street
- Dan Turpin, DC Comics police inspector
- Jane Turpin, character in children's literature created by Evadne Price
- Judge Turpin, chief antagonist in Sweeney Todd (musical)
- Ruby Turpin, protagonist in "Revelation" by Flannery O'Connor

== Places ==
- Turpin, Oklahoma, an unincorporated community
- Turpin, Virginia, an unincorporated community
- Turpin site, an archaeological site in Ohio
- Turpin's Cave, a location in Epping Forest, Essex, attributed as a hiding place of the highwayman Dick Turpin

== Other uses ==
- HMS Turpin (P354), a Royal Navy submarine
- Turtles (video game), a 1981 arcade game by Konami also known as Turpin
- Turpin High School (Hamilton County, Ohio)
- Turpin case, a case of abuse against minors by their parents that took place in 2018

== See also ==
- Historia Caroli Magni, sometimes called the Turpin Chronicle, a 12th-century forgery
