= Thomas Corrin =

English footballer

Personal information
- Full name: Thomas Corrin
- Date of birth: 1878
- Place of birth: Liverpool, England
- Date of death: 1936 (aged 57–58)
- Position: Winger

Senior career*
| Years | Team | Apps | (Gls) |
| 1900–1901 | Everton | 3 | (0) |
| 1901–1902 | Portsmouth | | |
| 1903–1904 | Everton | 8 | (1) |
| 1904–1905 | Reading | | |
| 1905–1906 | Plymouth Argyle | 47 | (5) |
| 1907 | Millwall Athletic | | |
| 1907 | Reading | | |
| Total | | 58 | (6) |
- * Club domestic league appearances and goals

Thomas Corrin (1878–1936) was an English footballer who played in the Football League for Everton and in the Southern League for Millwall Athletic, Plymouth Argyle, Portsmouth and Reading.
