= George Corrin =

American designer (1922–2015)

George Corrin (1922–2015) was an American scenic and graphic designer, known for creating the sets for presidential debates between Richard Nixon and John F. Kennedy.

== Early life and education ==
Corrin was born in Long Branch, New Jersey and first started designing sets in the 1940s. His first set was for the Studio Players of Essex County, New Jersey in 1942.

Corrin received a BFA from Carnegie Mellon University, where he was the first African-American student at the School of Drama. Corrin was nearly denied admission by the dean, who extended the offer after an outpouring of recommendation letters.

Corrin served for three years during World War II. He spent some time in the Special Services, where he worked on productions for troops in the South Pacific.

Corrin went on to receive an MFA from the Yale University School of Drama.

Corrin is the uncle of actor Michelle Shay.

== Career ==
Corrin designed sets for theater and television. In the 1950s he moved to New York City to work for ABC Television. At ABC-TV, he designed the Election Night Studio in 1964 and 1966. He also designed sets for shows including Voice of Firestone, Paul Whiteman Show, The Nurses, and Peter Jennings With The News.

After ABC, he worked for Reeves Teletape, where he managed the construction of the set for Sesame Street.

In the 1970s he worked independently for clients including AT&T, the Shubert Organization, the Insurance Information Institute, and Steelcase. He continued to design sets for Off-Broadway shows. He was art director for the 1979 film, The Hitter. Corrin also managed restoration of the Shubert Theater in 1989.
