= MacCorkle (surname) =

MacCorkle is a surname. It may refer to:

- Belle Goshorn MacCorkle (1841–1923), wife of William A. MacCorkle; First Lady of West Virginia
- William A. MacCorkle (1857–1930), American governor, teacher, lawyer, and financier; husband of Belle Goshorn MacCorkle
