= Chantal McCorkle =

British citizen (born 1968)

Chantal Watts McCorkle (born 1968, in Slough, England) is a British citizen who along with her American husband, William J. McCorkle (formerly Gonzalez), was tried and convicted, in 1998, in Florida, for her part in a financial fraud. The McCorkles sold kits purporting to show buyers how to get rich by buying property in foreclosures and government auctions. They advertised on infomercials; among the grounds for their conviction was their representation in the infomercials that they owned luxury automobiles and aeroplanes which had been rented for the commercials, and their use of purported testimonials from satisfied customers, who were paid actors.

She and her husband, both represented by F. Lee Bailey, were each originally sentenced to over 24 years in federal prison, under mandatory sentencing laws. After two appeals, the McCorkles' sentences were reduced, in 2006, to 18 years.

== Prison sentence controversy ==
McCorkle's incarceration in the US Federal Prison system began on 5 November 1998. She was assigned the following inmate identification number: 23033-018.

The severity of McCorkle's sentence drew notice in the United Kingdom, both in national media such as the BBC and amongst British politicians. On 22 February 2005, Early Day Motion number 733 in the British Houses of Parliament debated the following topic:-

That this House notes that Chantal McCorkle, a British citizen, was sentenced to 24 years and four months imprisonment in the United States for offences which might carry only a suspended sentence in the UK; further notes that the judge who sentenced her in 1999 expressed disquiet at the sentence that she felt obliged to give; further notes that recent cases of Blakely and Booker in the United States Supreme Court cast doubt on the sentencing guidelines then used and give grounds for an appeal; and urges the Government to support Chantal's lawyers and press the United States legal system to hear Chantal's appeal against sentence as expeditiously as possible and to ensure that no barriers are placed to Chantal's transfer to the UK to serve whatever remaining sentence she has after her appeal.

A total of 127 British MPs officially endorsed the early day motion and their American counterparts were made aware, though previous letters had already been sent by other politicians such as Lord Longford. Although subsequent representations have been made to the American judicial system e.g., by Fiona Mactaggart (an MP, and former Prisons Minister) these were not acted on.

After several years of legal appeals against her sentence, McCorkle applied to transfer to a British prison to serve the remainder of her sentence, under the terms of a reciprocal treaty with the USA. However, her application was rejected in July 2006. McCorkle reapplied for a treaty transfer in 2008 but her application was once again rejected in October of that year.

On 30 October 2008, McCorkle received a letter from the United States Office of the Pardon Attorney rejecting her request for commutation of her sentence.

After being transferred from FCI Dublin in California, as of July 2009 she was an inmate at FMC Carswell (Fort Worth, Texas) in the United States with an expected prison sentence expiry date of 7 July 2014. McCorkle remained in a medium-security prison, whereas William J. McCorkle (her ex-husband), had transferred to a low-security "camp" prison the previous year. McCorkle was not eligible for transfer to a lower-security prison because, as a British citizen, she was viewed as a high flight risk.

== Transfer to the UK & release from prison ==
A subsequent request for a Treaty Transfer (i.e., to serve the remainder of her sentence in a UK prison) was approved in May 2009. In early August, McCorkle appeared at a Texas Magistrate's Court to sign legal papers formally consenting to return to the UK. By 24 August 2009, McCorkle was in transit to the UK, incarcerated first at the BOP Federal Transfer Center in Oklahoma City and then (on 29 August) at the Metropolitan Correctional Center, New York. On 30 September 2009, she was driven to the nearest international airport, where custody was signed over to British prison officers who escorted her back to the UK. After arriving at London Heathrow Airport, McCorkle was transferred to HM Prison Holloway in London. At Holloway, she was assigned the following inmate identity number: EP6484.

On 30 October 2009, McCorkle was transferred to HM Prison Send, near Woking in Surrey. HMP Send has a significantly lower security classification than HMP Holloway, with a much easier prison regime. In early February 2010, she was transferred to HM Prison East Sutton Park and assigned the inmate identity number A2760AG. HMP East Sutton Park is an "open prison" i.e., has the lowest possible security rating in the British penal system. There are no security fences surrounding the prison and, subject to conditions, inmates are able to leave the grounds for home visits. McCorkle remained at HMP East Sutton Park until her release from prison on 25 June 2010.

== After release from prison ==
As of September 2010 she was living in Buckinghamshire, UK.
