= Ivers =

Ivers is the Name of the following people:

- Alice Ivers (1851 - 1930), professional saloon poker player and faro player
- Charlotte Ivers (born 1995), British journalist
- Donald L. Ivers (born 1941), former judge of the United States Court of Appeals for Veterans Claims
- Eileen Ivers (born 1965), Irish-American musician
- Julia Crawford Ivers (1869 - 1930), American motion picture pioneer
- Peter Ivers, Irish recruiter and strategist for the United Irishmen
- Peter Ivers (1946 - 1983), American musician
- Rebecca Ivers, Australian injury prevention researcher
- Robert Ivers (1934 - 2003), American actor

== See also ==
- The Strange Love of Martha Ivers
- Ivers Whitney Adams
