= William J. McCorkle =

American fraudster

William Joseph McCorkle (née Gonzalez; born 1966) was an American businessman and television salesman. In the 1990s he and his wife Chantal created a number of late-night television infomercials, selling videotapes and pamphlets which purported to teach people how to make money buying foreclosed real estate properties. Both McCorkle and his wife were convicted of fraud and served lengthy prison terms.

== History ==
McCorkle was born William Joseph Gonzalez in San Antonio, Texas in 1966, and later took the last name of a stepfather. William J. McCorkle attended Bishop Moore High School in Orlando, Florida, graduating in 1984. He worked in a number of jobs, including busing tables and exotic dancing, before turning to real estate as a career.

== Infomercials ==
In his infomercials, McCorkle represented himself as having made millions of dollars from the "real estate secrets" he was selling. The infomercials showed McCorkle and his wife in expensive homes, luxury cars and helicopters bearing his name—all of which had been leased for the infomercials. Others who appeared in the infomercials, affirming that the McCorkle Seminars had made them rich, were paid actors. Although the McCorkles lived in Orlando, Florida, they transferred most of the money they made to a bank account in the Cayman Islands.

== Trial and conviction ==
William and Chantal McCorkle were charged in a multi-count indictment with conspiracy to commit mail and wire fraud, laundering money, using fraudulently obtained credit cards, and using a false Social Security number. They were represented in court by F. Lee Bailey. Following a two-month jury trial, both McCorkles were convicted and sentenced to prison time. McCorkle reportedly collapsed when the jury pronounced him guilty, and had to be taken to the hospital.

The McCorkles were each originally sentenced to over 24 years in federal prison under mandatory sentencing laws, but after two appeals, their sentences were reduced on March 14, 2006 to 18 years. Following their conviction and incarceration, Chantal McCorkle divorced her husband. William McCorkle was eventually transferred to a low-security "camp" prison in preparation for release. Chantal McCorkle was released from prison in June 2010, and William was released in July 2014.

== See also ==
- Chantal McCorkle
