= Glenn Macaskill =

Writer and British South Africa Police officer

Glenn Macaskill is an author currently living in South Africa, formerly a long-serving member of the BSA Police in Zimbabwe (previously Rhodesia). His works often contain strong political undertones, exemplified at times by graphic descriptions of atrocities committed by Robert Mugabe's Fifth Brigade.

Currently, Macaskill has only one published work: King's Gold (ISBN 0-620-31002-2).
