= Bertie Crellin =

Australian rules footballer, born 1902

Personal information
- Full name: Bertram Harry Crellin
- Nickname: Bertie Crellin
- Born: 27 May 1902; Essendon, Victoria
- Died: 15 April 1993 (aged 90); Newport, Victoria
- Original team: Williamstown Football Club
- Position: Backline

Playing career^{1}
Years	Club	Games (Goals)
1926	Footscray	2 (0)
- ^{1} Playing statistics correct to the end of 1926.

Bertram Harry Crellin (27 May 1902 – 15 April 1993) was an Australian rules footballer who played with Footscray in the Victorian Football League (VFL).

Crellin was a mainstay at the Williamstown Football Club for much of the 1920s. From 1922 to 1929 he filled roles in the backline for Williamstown and was often a standout player. Like many men of the time, the great depression of 1929 saw Crellin seek employment in a regional area. He temporarily relocated to Bendigo at that time and played for the local Kangaroo Flat Football Club.
