= Thirkell =

Thirkell is a surname. Notable people with the surname include:

- Angela Thirkell (1890–1961), English-born Australian novelist
- John Thirkell (born 1958), British trumpet and flugelhorn player
- Percy Thirkell (1900–97), English footballer
- Richard Thirkell (AKA Richard Thirkeld, died 1583), English Roman Catholic priest and martyr

== See also ==
- Eric Thirkell Cooper (before 1915 – after 1947), British soldier and war poet during World War 1
- Herbert Thirkell White (1855–1931), Lieutenant Governor of Burma 1905–10, author of several books on Burma
