= Torfin, Minnesota =

Torfin
- Unincorporated community
- Location within Minnesota Location within the United States
- Coordinates: 48°35′52″N 95°44′01″W
- Country: United States
- State: Minnesota
- County: Roseau
- Elevation: 1,132 ft (345 m)
- Time zone: UTC-6 (Central (CST))
  - Summer (DST): UTC-5 (CDT)
- Area code: 218
- GNIS feature ID: 654977

Torfin is an unincorporated community in Roseau County, in the U.S. state of Minnesota.

== History ==
A post office called Torfin was established in 1907, and remained in operation until 1914. The community was named for Iver Torfin, county official.
