= Bragi Thorfinnsson =

Icelandic chess grandmaster (born 1981)

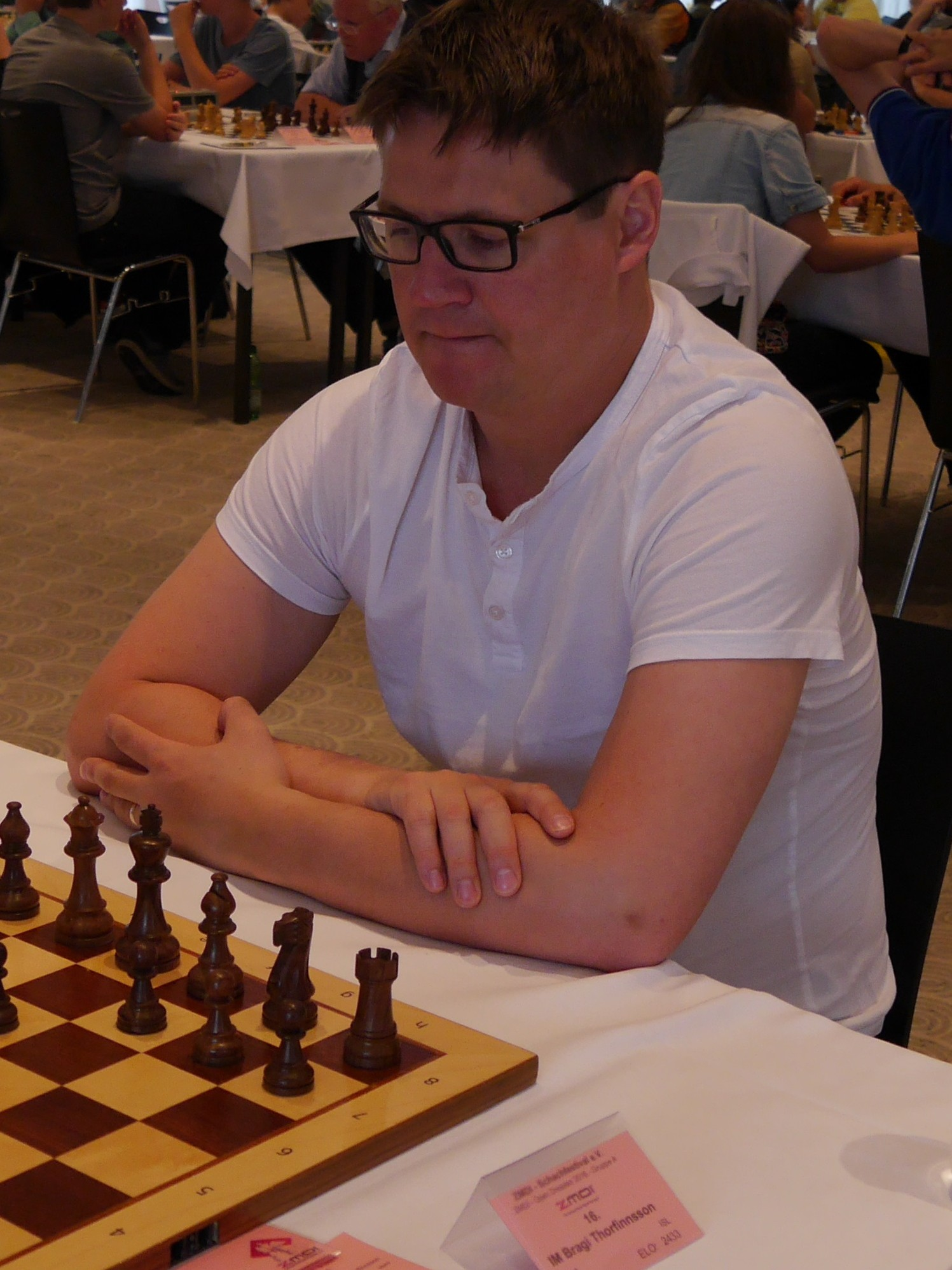
- Bragi Þorfinnsson in 2016

Personal information
- Born: 10 April 1981 (age 45) Reykjavík, Iceland

Chess career
- Country: Iceland
- Title: Grandmaster (2018)
- Peak rating: 2493 (June 2013)

Bragi Thorfinnsson (born 10 April 1981) is an Icelandic chess grandmaster.

== Chess career ==
Born in 1981, Bragi earned his international master title in 2003. He achieved his first grandmaster norm at the Four Nations Chess League 2012–13, scoring 6½/9 for the Jutes of Kent. He also reached an Elo rating of 2500 after six rounds of this event. He earned the second norm at the 2016–17 Icelandic Team Chess Championship, scoring 7/9, and his final norm at the Kragerø Resort Chess – a tournament in February 2018, scoring 7/9. He was awarded his grandmaster title by FIDE in April 2018, becoming the fourteenth and—at age 36—oldest Icelander to achieve the title.

He is the no. 10 ranked Icelandic player as of September 2020.

== Personal life ==
Bragi is the younger brother of international master and journalist Björn Thorfinnsson. Bragi is not a professional chess player, and works full-time as a school teacher. He is married and has three children.
