= Torkil (disambiguation) =

Torkil may refer to:

People

- Torkil Åmland (born 1966), Norwegian politician
- Torkil Damhaug (born 1958), Norwegian physician and crime fiction writer
- Torkil Gudnason, Danish fashion photographer
- Torkil Lauritzen, (1901-1979), a Danish actor
- Torkil Nielsen, (born 1964), Faroese football midfielder
- Torkil Veyhe (born 1990), Faroese road bicycle racer

Other

- Torkil, a Turkic tribe of the Middle Ages
