= Billie June McCaskill =

American herbarium curator and weed identifier

- Born: June 2, 1930; Altadena, California, United States
- Died: May 9, 2001 (aged 70); California, United States
- Resting place: San Gabriel Cemetery, California, United States.
- Scientific career
- Fields: Botany.

Billie June McCaskill, better known as June McCaskill (June 2, 1930 – May 9, 2001), was an American herbarium curator at the University of California, Davis and expert in weed identification.

== Life ==
McCaskill was born in Altadena, in California. She grew up in Pasadena where her parents, Vern and Billie operated a nursery called McCaskill Gardens.

She attended Mills College in 1949, and graduated with a degree in botany in 1951. She started her career at University of California, Davis in 1953, becoming the first curator of the Botany Department's Herbarium, a position that she held until her retirement. McCaskill specialised in the identification of weeds, and was particularly focused on agricultural weeds that were toxic to livestock. Her botanical skills were also used to investigate multiple homicides. She retired in 1991.

== Published major work ==
- William (Bill) B. Fischer, Arthur H. Lange, June McCaskill, Beecher Crampton, and Betsey Tabraham, Growers Weed Identification Handbook (University of California), multiple editions.
- John M. Tucker, and June McCaskill. "Heteranthera Limosa in California." Madroño, vol. 19, no. 2, 1967, pp. 64–64.

== Legacy ==
The June McCaskill Plant Identification Laboratory of the University of California, Davis's Center for Plant Diversity herbaria opened in 2005. It was named in her honour.

The following cultivar was named in her honour by her father:

- Camellia japonica 'June McCaskill.'

== Botanical collections ==
Her collections of Californian weeds are held in various North American herbaria, including the University of California, Davis Herbarium, and the Agriculture and Agri-Food Canada National Collection of Vascular Plants. In Australasia, her specimens are held at the Auckland War Memorial Museum Herbarium, the Allan Herbarium, and the National Herbarium of Victoria, Royal Botanic Gardens Victoria.
