= Vern McCaskill =

American nurseryman and plant breeder

- Born: January 11, 1902
- Died: March 23, 1992 (aged 90)
- Resting place: San Gabriel Cemetery, California, United States
- Children: 3, including June McCaskill

Vern McCaskill (January 1, 1902 – March 23, 1992) was a nurseryman active in southern California for much of the 20th century who specialised in breeding Camellia and Azalea cultivars. He was the father of the botanist and herbarium curator June McCaskill.

== Early life ==
In June 1918, McCaskill was recruited from Missouri, and admitted to the United States Naval Academy at the age of 16. While enrolled he met Billie Lee Nowlin, then a student at Drury University and they soon married.

This led to his dismissal from the academy in March 1919, "since a midshipman at the Academy could not have a wife, a horse, or a beard," and it ended his military career.

The newlyweds went to California for their honeymoon, and initially returned to Missouri before relocating in the early 1920s. Vern and Billie found work at the Coolidge Rare Plant Gardens, which their daughter June attributed to cultivating their love of exotic garden plants.

== Horticultural legacy ==
Billie Lee and Vern built their home, and opened a nursery on South Michillinda Avenue in Pasadena, California, in 1932. Specialising in Camellias and Azaleas, the business became the largest Camellia nursery in the southern California region. Over his horticultural career, between 1930 and 1988, McCaskill developed 72 Camellia japonica cultivars and eight non-reticulata hybrids between 1930 and 1988. In the 1970s, due to the long periods of time needed to create new Camellia cultivars and hybrids, McCaskill switched to Iris ser. Californicae, and started to sell Iris cultivars.

As an accredited Camellia judge, McCaskill also became the director of the Southern California Camellia Society. He was the editor of the first Camellia nomenclature book in 1942, entitled Classification of Camellias. it listed 196 varieties. He also edited the first Camellia taxonomy work in 1947 with William E. Woodroof and O.L. Eakin, with 911 cultivars, as The Camellia, Its Culture and Nomenclature.

Vern is credited as hybridisers of the following irises:

- Iris 'Hidden Shadows'
- Iris 'Kaweah Maiden'
- Iris 'Kaweah Sunrise'
- Iris 'Showers of Flowers'
