= McIver =

McIver and MacIver are Scottish and Northern Irish surnames. The names are derived from the Gaelic Mac Íomhair, meaning "‘son of Íomhar". The Gaelic personal name Íomhar is a form of the Old Norse personal name Ivarr. Similar surnames or variants include McKeever and McIvor.

== Use as a surname ==
McIver

- Annabelle McIver, British-educated Australian computer scientist
- Charles Duncan McIver, American academic
- Don McIver, New Zealand military officer
- Evander McIver, Australian architect, engineer and surveyor
- Henry McIver, American mercenary
- Hugh McIver, Scottish soldier
- Jock McIver, a stage name of the English music hall performer best known as Talbot O'Farrell (1878–1952)
- Joel McIver, author
- Kathryn McIver Garcia (born 1970), Commissioner of the New York City Sanitation Department
- Kelie McIver, American actress
- Ken McIver, after whom McIver railway station, in Perth, Australia, is named
- LaMonica McIver, American politician
- Margaret McIver (1933–2020), Australian equestrian
- Pearl McIver, American nurse and public official
- Richard McIver, American politician
- Rose McIver, New Zealand actress

MacIver

- Michael "Micky" MacIver, Scottish Marine Engineer
- Norm Maciver, Canadian sportsman
- Robert Morrison MacIver, American sociologist
- Stuart MacIver, Scottish footballer
- Willie MacIver, American baseball player

== Other uses ==
- Evander McIver Law (1836–1920), Confederate general
- Clan MacIver, a Scottish clan
