= Corkill =

Corkill is a surname of Irish and Manx origin. The name is an Anglicised form of the Gaelic Mac Thorcaill ("son of Thorkell") which is derived from the Old Norse personal name meaning "Thor's kettle".

== People ==
- Danny Corkill (born 1974), American actor
- Richard Corkill (born 1951), Manx, a Chief Minister of the Isle of Man
