= Clan McCorquodale =

Scottish clan

- Crest: A stag at gaze Proper attired Gules
- Motto: Vivat Rex (From Lat. Long live the king)

Profile
- Region: Highlands
- District: Argyll
- Clan McCorquodale no longer has a chief, and is an armigerous clan
- Historic seat: Eilean-a-Bharain Castle on Loch Tromlee
- Last Chief: Baron McCorquodale
- Died: 18th century

Clan McCorquodale is a Scottish clan, recognised by the Lord Lyon King of Arms, though without a chief so recognised. The last chief of the clan died in the 18th century. Because the clan does not have a recognised chief, it is considered an armigerous clan, and has no legal standing under Scots Law. Historically, the clan inhabited lands west of Loch Awe, in Argyll. These clan lands were centred at Loch Tromlee, where an island castle served as the clan seat. The line of Clan McCorquodale chiefs, first recorded in the 15th century, has been untraced since the 18th century.

== Origin of the name ==
The surname McCorquodale is an Anglicisation of the Gaelic MacThorcadail (or MacCorcadail), meaning "son of Torcadal". The Gaelic personal name Torcadal is of Norse origin and means "Thor's kettle" (a more romanticised meaning for the name has been given as "cauldron of the thunder spirit"). In 1881, the surname was most frequent in lands which constitute the current Paisley postcode area. This, more or less, corresponds with the Clan McCorquodale's traditional lands in Argyll. The clans Macleod of the Lewes and Gunn claim variations of this surname as septs of theirs. Septs are families which claimed allegiance to stronger chief and his clan, or that lived upon lands controlled by a stronger chief and his clan. The majority of those McCorquodales recorded in 1881 were located far from the traditional lands of these two clans.

== History of the clan ==
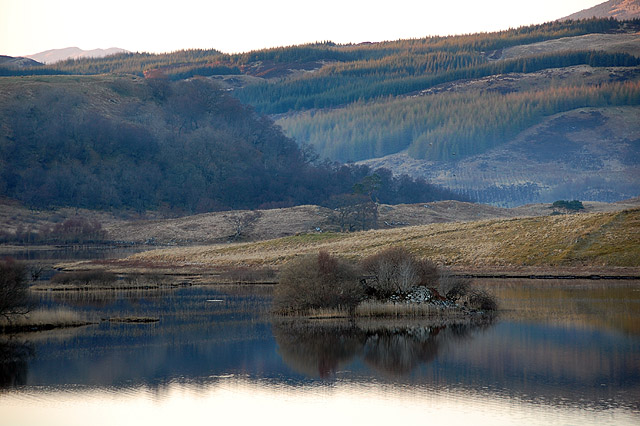
Eilean-a-Bharain ("the baron's island") on Loch Tromlee. The ruinous castle upon the island was once the seat of the chiefs of Clan McCorquodale.

The founder of the clan, according to legend, was a Thorkil (Torcadal) who was a member of the Scots army under Kenneth MacAlpin. The legendary story states that Alpin, father of Kenneth MacAlpin, was killed in battle, and his head was carried off by enemy Picts. Alpin's head was then displayed in the Pictish town of Camelon. The story goes on to state that the claimed ancestor of the McCorquodales, Thorkil, recovered Alpin's head. For this deed, Thorkil was said to have been rewarded with lands on Loch Awe side. Be that as it may, the earliest record of the clan occurs in the 15th century. The Barons McCorquodale are recorded at this time, as holding sway over lands in Argyll, west of Loch Awe. They were centred at Phantelane (Anglicised from the Scottish Gaelic: Fionnt Eilean), or the "white island". Eilean-a-Bharain (from Scottish Gaelic: "the baron's island") was located in Loch Tromlee, on which their castle was located. Today the loch has been affected by drainage, the site of the castle ruins is no longer always an island. At one point in time, the entire shore of Loch Awe from Avich to Ard-an-aiseig was owned by the chiefs of the clan.

In 1434 Ewan, son of Ewan Makcorquydill received a grant of lands. In his charter, Ewan was described as "Lord of Maintelan". According to Black, this refers to "Phanteland". As time passed the McCorquodales of Phantelands became the most prominent family of McCorquodales. In 1542, the lands held by the Barons McCorquodale where incorporated into a free barony. In 1556, the seal of Duncan McCorquodale of Phantelane bore the legend, "S.duncan.mak.corkatill", which surrounded a shield with, a stag trippant couped halfway paleways. By 1612, Duncan was dead and his younger sons, Iain and Lachlan, were declared by the Privy Council as "notorious thieves and the supporters of Clan Gregour". These MacGregors were wanted for many crimes, including the theft of a brown mare from the deceased Duncan. The barony passed from Duncan to his son, Duncan. According to Moncreiffe, this baron seems to have had sons by different wives, as the legitimacy of his heirs was "hotly disputed between the two litters". In the 17th century the clan supported the Campbells in the Civil wars.

In 1645, while campaigning, Alasdair MacColla and his men marched along the shore of Loch Tromlee. MacColla ordered his men to leave the castle and lands of the McCorquodales to be left un-molested. At the same time, Baron McCorquodale had his men standing to with orders not to fire. However, one of McCorquodale's men opened fire upon MacColla's men, and as a result one Macdonald clansman was killed. In retaliation MacColla ordered the destruction of the island castle of the McCorquodales. Duncan McCorquodale of Phantelane was one of the Justices of the peace for Argyllshire, appointed in 1656 by Oliver Cromwell. In the 18th century, the last Baron McCorquodale to hold the clan lands around Loch Tromlee died, leaving the clan without a chief to this day. By the end of the 18th century there were McCorquodales living on Loch Aweside, who claimed to be descended from the legendary founder of the clan.

== Clan profile ==
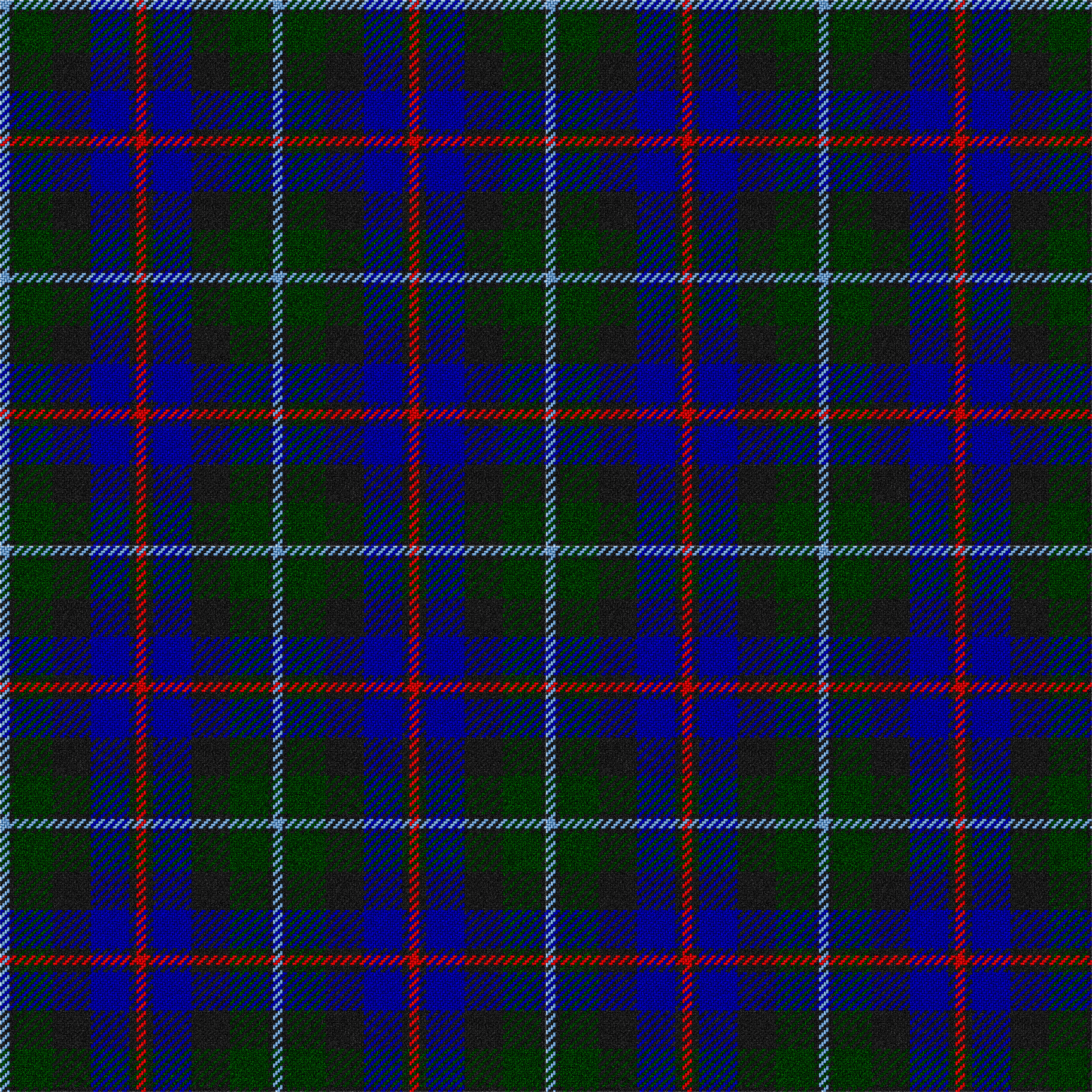
This tartan, adopted by MacCorquodales, dates from 1819. It was originally recorded as an "Argyll" tartan. It is one of several tartans recognised by the chief of Clan Campbell, as suitable for Campbells of Clan Campbell of Cawdor.

Crest badge

Today, those who profess to be members of Clan McCorquodale are permitted to wear a crest badge which shows their allegiance to the clan. Crest badges are of relatively recent origin, and usually consist of strap and buckle surrounding the clan chief's heraldic crest and motto. The crest badge suitable for a member of Clan McCorquodale contains the Latin motto: vivat rex, meaning "long live the king"; and the crest of a stag at gaze proper attired gules. These two heraldic elements are derived from the coat of arms of "Duncan Macorquodaill of that Ilk", registered in 1672. These arms are recorded in the Lyon Register as argent, a stag gules attired Or issuing from a fess wreathed of the second and third. In Scotland, it is against the law to appropriate the arms of another individual. Even the heraldic elements of the clan member's crest badge, do not belong to members of Clan McCorquodale, but to the clan's chief (or last recognised chief).

== See also ==
- McCorquodale, a disambiguation page listing occurrences of McCorquodale in Wikipedia
