= USS Edward J. McKeever Jr. =

Patrol vessel of the United States Navy

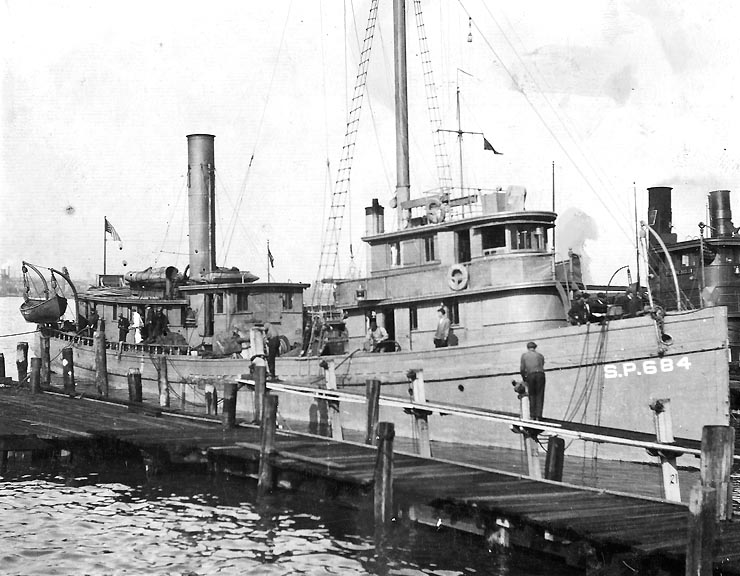
- USS Edward J. McKeever Jr. (SP-684) ca. 1918.

History

United States
- Name: USS Edward J. McKeever Jr.
- Namesake: Previous name retained
- Builder: Robert Palmer & Sons, Noank, Connecticut
- Completed: 1910
- Acquired: 5 May 1917
- Commissioned: 5 May 1917
- Decommissioned: 21 May 1919
- Fate: Sold 21 May 1919
- Notes: Operated as commercial fishing vessel Edward J. McKeever Jr. 1910-1917

General characteristics
- Type: Patrol vessel and minesweeper
- Tonnage: 223 gross register tons
- Length: 136 ft (41 m) or 137 ft 4 in (41.86 m)
- Beam: 15 ft 8 in (4.78 m) or 24 ft (7.3 m)
- Draft: 7 ft 8 in (2.34 m) or 12 ft (3.7 m)
- Speed: 10 or 13 knots
- Complement: 25 or 32
- Armament: 1 or 2 × 3-pounder guns

USS Edward J. McKeever Jr. (SP-684) was a United States Navy patrol vessel and minesweeper in commission from 1917 to 1919.

Edward J. McKeever Jr. was built as a commercial fishing vessel of the same name by Robert Palmer & Sons at Noank, Connecticut, in 1910. On 5 May 1917, the U.S. Navy acquired her from her owners, McKeever Brothers, Inc., of New York City, for use during World War I. Assigned the section patrol number 684, she was commissioned the same day as USS Edward J. McKeever Jr. (SP-684).

Assigned to the 4th Naval District, Edward J. McKeever Jr. performed patrol, minesweeping, towing, and transport duties for the rest of World War I.

On 21 May 1919, Edward J. McKeever Jr. was decommissioned and sold to the Wilcox Fertilizer Company of Mystic, Connecticut.

On 1 September 1919 the fishing steamer went ashore on Sea Flower Reef near Fishers Island, New York.
