= USS McKeever Brothers =

Patrol vessel of the United States Navy

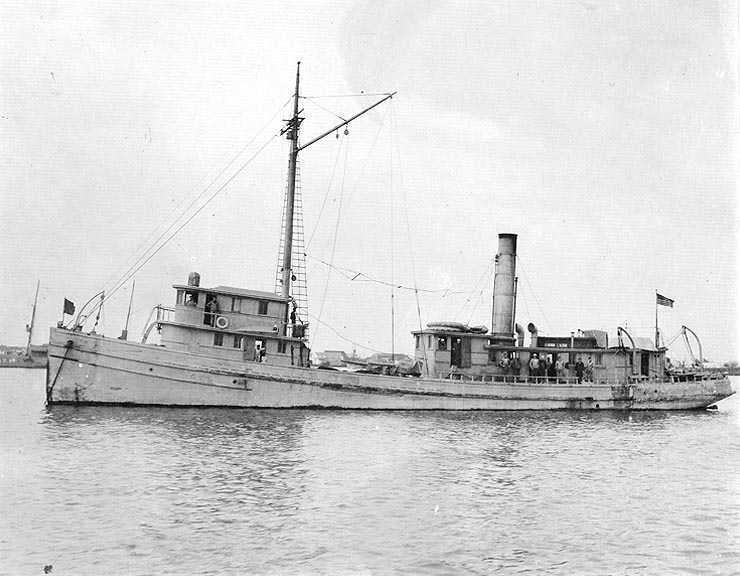
- USS McKeever Brothers (SP-683) off Philadelphia, Pennsylvania, during World War I.

History

United States
- Name: USS McKeever Brothers
- Namesake: Previous name retained
- Builder: Robert Palmer & Sons, Noank, Connecticut
- Completed: 1911
- Acquired: 18 May 1917
- Commissioned: 5 May 1917
- Stricken: 22 March 1919
- Fate: Sold 1 July 1919
- Status: Still abandoned in Seaford Delaware as of 2021
- Notes: Operated as commercial fishing vessel McKeever Brothers 1911-1917

General characteristics
- Type: Patrol vessel and minesweeper
- Length: 136 ft (41 m)
- Beam: 24 ft (7.3 m)
- Draft: 12 ft (3.7 m) mean
- Propulsion: Steam engine
- Speed: 10 knots
- Complement: 22
- Armament: 2 × 3-pounder guns

USS McKeever Brothers (SP-683), sometimes written as USS McKeever Bros., was a United States Navy patrol vessel and minesweeper in commission from 1917 to 1919.

McKeever Brothers was built as a commercial steam "menhaden fisherman"-type fishing vessel of the same name by Robert Palmer & Sons at Noank, Connecticut, in 1911. In May 1917, the U.S. Navy acquired her from her owners, Steven W. McKeever and Edward J. McKeever, for use during World War I. Assigned the section patrol number 683, she was commissioned on 5 May 1917 as USS McKeever Brothers (SP-683). Her acquisition from the McKeevers apparently formally took place retrospectively on 18 May 1917.

Assigned to the 4th Naval District and based at Philadelphia, Pennsylvania, McKeever Brothers conducted coastal and minesweeping patrols in the Delaware River and Delaware Bay for the remainder of World War I.

McKeever Brothers was decommissioned after the war, stricken from the Navy List on 22 May 1919, and sold on 1 July 1919. The ship was used as a private fishing vessel in the Chesapeake Bay, home-ported out of Shad Point, Maryland, along the Wicomico River into the early 1960s. After several years of inactivity, McKeever Brothers was towed down the Nanticoke River, and into a specially dug channel alongside the river, near the intersection of US Route 13 and Concord Rd in Seaford, Delaware. Once in place, the channel was backfilled, leaving the ship grounded. Following extensive alterations, McKeever Brothers opened to the public in 1968 as the Flagship Nanticoke Queen seafood restaurant. The ship operated in that capacity for several decades, under different owners and a few name changes. The facility last operated as the Nautico Restaurant, and closed sometime in the early 2000s. McKeever Brothers remains in place, in deteriorating condition. In 2021, the property appeared to be sold and the ship was removed, with location/status unknown.
