= McIvor (surname) =

Origin
- Language: 1. Scottish Gaelic/Irish Gaelic
- Origin: 1. Mac Íomhair; 2. MacÌomhair
- Meaning: 1. "son of Íomhar"; 2. "son of Ìomhar"

Other names
- Variant forms: MacIvor, McKeever
- See also: McIver

McIvor and MacIvor are anglicised forms of the Irish and Scottish Gaelic Mac Íomhair, meaning "son of Íomhar". Other variants McKeever and McIver.

== People with the surname ==
McIvor

- Ashleigh McIvor (born 1983), Canadian freestyle skier
- Basil McIvor (1928–2004), Northern Irish Ulster Unionist politician
- Dan McIvor, several people
- Duncan McIvor, Australian footballer
- Hector McIvor (1900–1992), Australian politician
- Ivor McIvor (1917–1997), Australian footballer
- James McIvor, New Zealand boxer
- Jill McIvor (1930–2019), Northern Irish public servant, first Northern Irish woman Ombudsman and Commissioner for Complaints
- Lois McIvor (1930–2017), New Zealand painter
- Maverick McIvor (born 2000), American football player
- Rick McIvor (born 1960), American football player
- Ron McIvor (1951–2021), Scottish football player
- Scott McIvor (born 1966), Australian rules footballer
- Stephen McIvor (born about 1969), Irish rugby player
- Wilbert McIvor, Canadian provincial politician
- William Graham McIvor (1824–1876), Scottish gardener who introduced cinchona in southern India

MacIvor

- Daniel MacIvor (born 1962), Canadian actor, playwright, theatre director and film director
- John Smith MacIvor (1913–1957), Canadian lawyer and political figure
- Rod MacIvor (born 1946), Canadian photojournalist

== See also ==
- McIver, variant or similar surname
