= Björn Thorfinnsson =

Icelandic chess player and journalist

Björn Thorfinnsson (born 25 October 1979) is an Icelandic chess player and journalist. He holds the title of International Master.

In 1995, he was a member of Iceland's first-place Under-16 Chess Olympiad team.

He is the elder brother of chess grandmaster Bragi Thorfinnsson.
