= McCorquodale =

McCorquodale is a surname of Scottish origin. The name originates from Argyll in the West Highlands.

== People with the surname McCorquodale ==
English McCorquodale family:

- George McCorquodale (1817–1895), founder of McCorquodale printers.
  - George Frederick McCorquodale (1853–1936) m. 1879 Mary Augusta Henderson, daughter of Sir Edmund Henderson.
  - Alexander Cowan McCorquodale (1858–1941)
    - Alexander George McCorquodale (1897–1964) m. 1927 Barbara Cartland (1901–2000)
      - Raine McCorquodale (1929–2016), British socialite and stepmother of Diana, Princess of Wales, m. 1st Gerald Legge, 9th Earl of Dartmouth, m. 2nd John Spencer, 8th Earl Spencer, m. 3rd Count Jean-François Pineton de Chambrun.
  - Kate McCorquodale m. 1897 General Henry Horne, 1st Baron Horne (1861–1929)
  - Norman McCorquodale (1863–1938) m. 1897 Constance Eleanor Burton
    - Brigadier Norman McCorquodale (1898–1971) m. 1923 Barbara de Knoop
      - Captain Euan Norman Jersey McCorquodale (1929–2010) m. 1st 1955-65 Ann Sybella Sarah Penelope Clive (born 1936), daughter of Brigadier Archer Clive, m. 2nd 1969 Sally Seaborne May
        - Joanna McCorquodale (born 1957), m. Hew Blair
        - David Norman Berkeley McCorquodale (born 1960), m. 1st Elizabeth Ann Gubbins, m. 2nd Jessica Donnelly
        - James McCorquodale, m. Claire Alexandra Margret Coode
        - Laura McCorquodale, m. 2000-2017 William Sitwell
      - Mary Pamela McCorquodale (1932–2025) m. Fergus Bowes-Lyon, 17th Earl of Strathmore and Kinghorne (1928–1987).
    - Malcolm McCorquodale, 1st Baron McCorquodale (1901–1971), British politician, m. 1st Winifred Sophia Clark, m. 2nd 1962 Hon. Daisy Pearson, daughter of Weetman Pearson, 2nd Viscount Cowdray.
      - Hon. Pamela Susan McCorquodale (1934–1993) m. William Forbes of Callendar
      - Hon. Prudence Fiona McCorquodale (born 1936) m. Carel Maurits Mosselmans
    - Captain George McCorquodale m. 1933 Hon. Charlotte Enid Lawson Johnston, daughter of George Lawson Johnston, 1st Baron Luke.
    - Pamela Constance McCorquodale (1910–1944) m. Major Angus McCorquodale (1905–1940) [see below]
  - Harold McCorquodale (1865–1943) m. 1893 Grace Granville
    - Major Kenneth McCorquodale (1894–1976) m. 1923 Ellen Viva Martin
      - Alastair McCorquodale (1925–2009), athlete and cricketer, m. Rosemary Turnor
        - Sarah McCorquodale (1948–2008) m. Geoffrey van Cutsem, son of Bernard van Cutsem.
        - Neil McCorquodale (born 1951) m. Lady Sarah Spencer (born 1955), elder sister of Diana, Princess of Wales.
          - Emily Jane McCorquodale (born 1983) m. James Hutt
          - George Edmund McCorquodale (born 1984) m. Bianca Moore
          - Celia Rose McCorquodale (born 1989) m. George Woodhouse
      - Joan McCorquodale (born 1931) m. Bertram Bowyer, 2nd Baron Denham
    - Hugh McCorquodale (1898–1963) m. 1936 Barbara Cartland (1901–2000)
      - Ian McCorquodale (1937–2023)
      - Glen McCorquodale (born 1939)
    - Colonel Donald McCorquodale (1902–1985) m. Diana Margaret Tennant
      - John McCorquodale (1930–2005)
      - Agnes McCorquodale (born 1934)
    - Major Angus McCorquodale (1905–1940) m. Pamela Constance McCorquodale (1910–1944) [see above]
      - Rona Helena McCorquodale (1936-2025) m. David Lowsley-Williams (1933-2023)
      - Colin Norman McCorquodale (born 1938)

McCorquodale in Scotland:

- Charles P. McCorquodale (1948–1996), art historian and author

McCorquodale in the United States:

- Joe McCorquodale (1920–2017), American politician
- Corky McCorquodale (1904–1968), professional poker player
- Dan McCorquodale (born 1934), American politician
- Timothy McCorquodale (1952–1987), American convicted murderer

== Other ==
- Baron McCorquodale, an extinct barony in the Peerage of the United Kingdom
- Clan McCorquodale, a Scottish clan
