= Poems for the Hazara =

2014 poetry anthology

Poems for the Hazara: A Multilingual Poetry Anthology and Collaborative Poem
- Editor: Kamran Mir Hazar
- Author: 125 poets from 68 countries
- Language: Multilingual
- Subject: Hazara people
- Genre: Poetry
- Publisher: Full Page Publishing
- Publication date: 2014
- Publication place: United States
- Media type: Print (hardback & paperback)
- Pages: 600
- ISBN: 978-0983770824

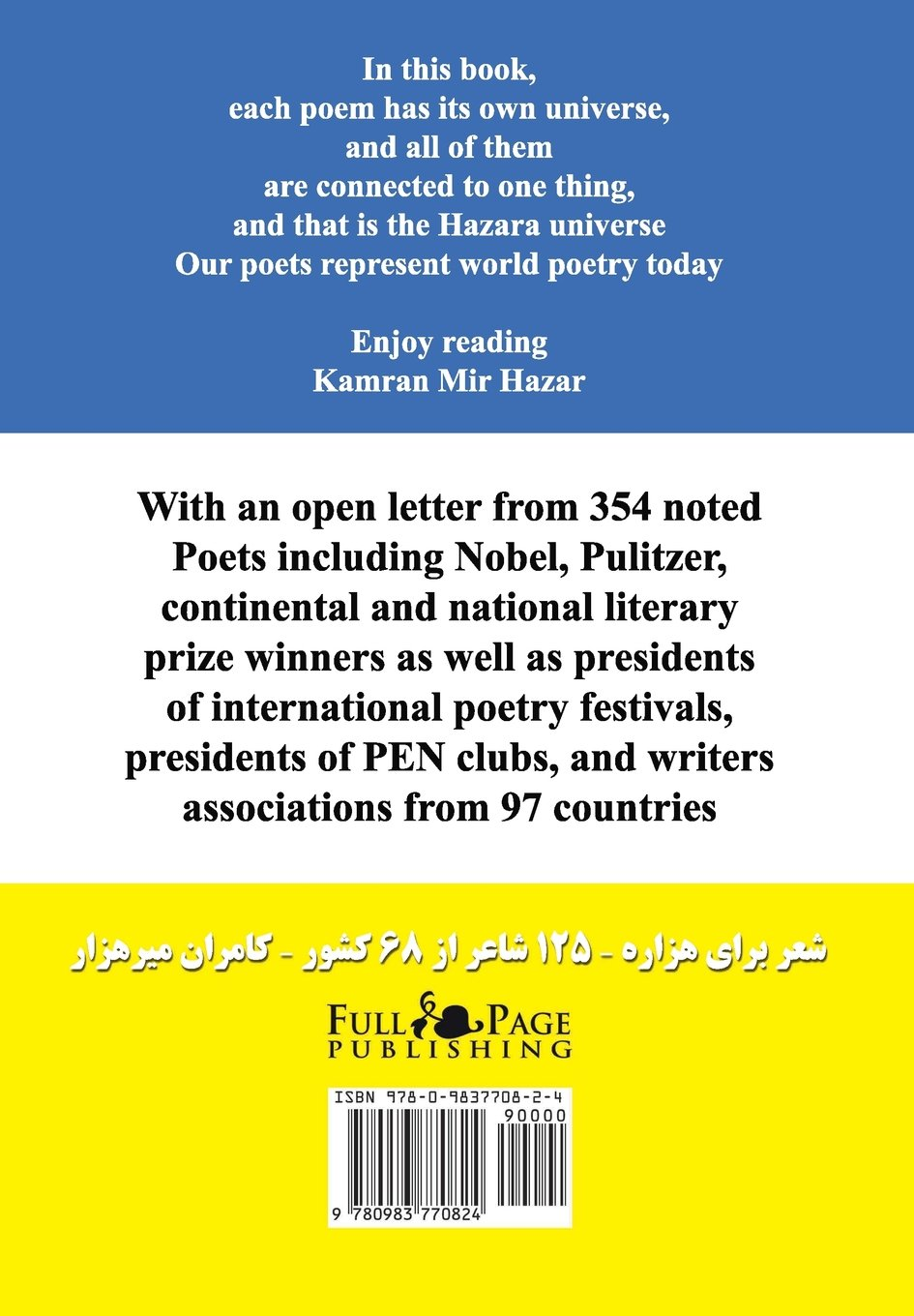

Poems for the Hazara is a multilingual poetry anthology and a collaborative poem composed of the works of 125 internationally recognized poets from sixty-eight countries. Poems in this book are in English, Spanish, Catalan, Japanese, Norwegian, Turkish, Hazaragi, Italian, Greek, German, Irish, Hebrew, Romanian, French, Armenian, Hungarian and Portuguese. All non-English poems have been translated into English. The book includes the poetry anthology and a collaborative poem featuring contributions from 23 international poets. An open letter from 354 celebrated poets including Nobel, Pulitzer, continental and national literary prize winners, and presidents of PEN clubs and writers' associations from 97 countries is included at the end. This letter is addressed to world leaders in support of the Hazara people. The executive editor is Hazara poet, journalist and human rights activist, Kamran Mir Hazar.

== Poets ==
- Etnairis Ribera, Puerto Rico
- Angelina Llongueras, Catalonia
- Aju Mukhopadhyay, Pondicherry, India
- Ban'ya Natsuishi, Japan
- Julio Pavanetti, Uruguay/Spain
- Gertrude Fester, Rwanda/South Africa
- Jack Hirschman, United States
- Iztok Osojnik, Slovenia
- Erling Kittelsen, Norway
- Obediah Michael Smith, Bahamas
- Raúl Henao, Colombia
- Anne Waldman, United States
- Nguyen Quang Thieu, Vietnam
- Timo Berger, Germany
- Elsa Tió, Puerto Rico
- Kamran Mir Hazar, Hazarajat, Afghanistan
- Rodrigo Verdugo, Chile
- Mildred Kiconco Barya, Uganda
- Stefaan Van Den Bremt, Flanders, Belgium
- Winston Morales Chavarro, Colombia
- Esteban Valdés Arzate, Mexico
- Akwasi Aidoo, Ghana/United States
- Yolanda Pantin, Venezuela
- Yiorgos Chouliaras, Greece
- James O'Hara, Mexico, United States and Ireland
- Raquel Chalfi, Israel
- Jim Byron, United States
- Luisa Vicioso Sánchez, Dominican Republic
- Andrea Garbin, Italy
- Luz Helena Cordero Villamizar, Colombia
- Peter Voelker, Germany
- Zoran Anchevski, Macedonia
- Naotaka Uematsu, Japan
- Paul Disnard, Colombia
- Vyacheslav Kupriyanov, Russia
- Gabriel Rosenstock, Ireland
- Maruja Vieira, Colombia
- Nyein Way, Myanmar
- Gaston Bellemare, Quebec
- Zohra Hamid, South Africa
- Amir Or, Israel
- Ivan Djeparoski, Macedonia
- Attila F. Balázs, Slovakia
- Ioana Trica, Romania
- Michaël Glück, France
- Quito Nicolaas, Netherlands
- Noria Adel, Algeria
- Francisco Sánchez Jiménez, Colombia
- Werewere Liking, Cameroon/Ivory Coast
- Beppe Costa, Italy
- William Pérez Vega, Puerto Rico
- Fanny Moreno, Colombia
- John Curl, United States
- Kevin Kiely, Ireland
- Azam Abidov, Uzbekistan
- Luis Galar (No Country)
- Santiago B. Villafania, Philippines
- Althea Romeo-Mark, Antigua
- Bengt Berg, Sweden
- Luz Lescure, Panama
- Lola Koundakjian, Armenia
- Zindzi Mandela, South Africa
- Edvino Ugolini, Italy
- Jean-Claude Awono, Cameroon
- Stefania Battistella, Italy
- Eugenia Sánchez Nieto, Colombia
- Alina Beatrice Chesca, Romania
- Simón Zavala Guzmán, Ecuador
- Ostap Nozhak, Ukraine
- Berry Heart, Botswana
- Gilma De Los Ríos, Colombia
- Laura Hernandez Muñoz, Mexico
- Mamang Dai, India
- Erkut Tokman, Turkey
- Álvaro Miranda, Colombia
- Claus Ankersen, Denmark
- Mark Lipman, United States
- John Hegley, England
- Micere Githae Mugo, Kenya
- Germain Droogenbroodt, Belgium/Spain
- Fiyinfoluwa Onarinde, Nigeria
- Ataol Behramoğlu, Turkey
- Khal Torabully, Mauritius/France
- Jorge Boccanera, Argentina
- Kama Sywor Kamanda, DR Congo
- Bineesh Puthuppanam, India
- Iris Miranda, Puerto Rico
- Pamela Ateka, Kenya
- Fahredin Shehu, Kosovo
- Tamer Öncul, Cyprus
- Tânia Tomé, Mozambique
- Howard A. Fergus, Montserrat, West Indies
- Janak Sapkota, Nepal
- Károly Fellinger, Hungary
- Alfred Tembo, Zambia
- Emilce Strucchi, Argentina
- Juan Diego Tamayo, Colombia
- Manuel Silva Acevedo, Chile
- Elias Letelier, Chile
- Mohammed Bennis, Morocco
- Károly Sándor Pallai, Hungary
- Edgardo Nieves-Mieles, Puerto Rico
- Fatoumata Ba, Mali
- Vupenyu Otis Zvoushe, Zimbabwe
- Santosh Alex, India
- Silvana Berki, Albania/Finland
- Hussein Habasch, Kurdistan, Syria
- Lucy Cristina Chau, Panama
- Jessie Kleemann, Greenland
- Siki Dlanga, South Africa
- Irena Matijašević, Croatia
- Boel Schenlaer, Sweden
- Merlie M. Alunan, Philippines
- Ernesto P. Santiago, Philippines
- Rassool Snyman, South Africa
- Mary Smith, Scotland
- K. Satchidanandan, India
- Sukrita Paul Kumar, India
- Birgitta Jónsdóttir, Iceland
- Zelma White, Montserrat, British West Indies
- Navkirat Sodhi, India
- Gémino H. Abad, Philippines
- Mbizo Chirasha, Zimbabwe
- Joyce Ashuntantang, Cameroon/United States

== Cover ==
The cover shows a photograph of Buddha in Bamiyan, courtesy of Najibullah Mosafer. Kamran Mir Hazar proposed the flag of Hazaristan.

== See also ==
- Kamran Mir Hazar
- Flag of Hazaristan
- Hazaristan
