= Education Without Borders =

Education Without Borders may refer to:

- Education Without Borders (Canadian organization)
- Education Without Borders (Spanish organization)
- Education Without Borders (Sudan)
