= James Ngculu =

South African politician and businessman (born 1955)

Member of the National Assembly
- In office 1998–2009

Provincial Chairperson of the Western Cape African National Congress
- In office June 2005 – September 2008
- Deputy: Randall van den Heever
- Preceded by: Ebrahim Rasool
- Succeeded by: Mcebisi Skwatsha

Provincial Secretary of the Western Cape African National Congress
- In office 1994 – April 1998
- Deputy: Manfred van Rooyen; Marius Fransman
- Chairperson: Chris Nissen; Dullah Omar
- Succeeded by: Mcebisi Skwatsha

Personal details
- Born: Lincoln Vumile Ngculu; 27 August 1955 (age 71) Cape Town, Cape Province; Union of South Africa
- Party: African National Congress
- Other political affiliations: South African Communist Party
- Spouse: Miranda Ngculu (died 1994)

Lincoln Vumile "James" Ngculu (born 27 August 1955) is a South African businessman, politician, and former anti-apartheid activist. He represented the African National Congress (ANC) in the National Assembly from 1998 to 2009 and was provincial chairperson of the ANC's Western Cape branch from 2005 to 2008.

Born in Cape Town, Ngculu was a member of the June 16 Detachment that joined Umkhonto we Sizwe in exile in the aftermath of the 1976 Soweto uprising, and he later published a well-known memoir, The Honour to Serve, about his time in exile. Upon his return to South Africa, he served as provincial secretary of the Western Cape ANC from 1994 to 1998 and then joined Parliament, where he served for two terms as chairperson of the Portfolio Committee on Health. He was elected as ANC provincial chairperson in June 2005 with the backing of Mcebisi Skwatsha's Africanist faction, but Skwatsha unseated him in September 2008 after the pair fell out over Ngculu's perceived support for ANC president Thabo Mbeki's re-election bid.

After leaving Parliament at the 2009 general election, Ngculu continued to pursue his business interests, notably in the mining sector. He is a non-executive director at WeSizwe Platinum and in 2023 was appointed to a second term as a member of the ANC's internal Integrity Commission.

== Early life ==
Ngculu was born on 27 August 1955 in Cape Town in the former Cape Province. He and several friends were expelled from Fezeka High School after a vandalism incident, and they completed high school in the rural Eastern Cape, where they came into contact with local supporters of the anti-apartheid movement, including members of the African National Congress (ANC) underground. After the 1976 Soweto uprising, they left South Africa for Botswana via Soweto to join the ANC in exile.

== Umkhonto we Sizwe: 1976–1993 ==
In exile, Ngculu was recruited into the ANC's armed wing, Umkhonto we Sizwe (MK), and also joined the South African Communist Party. After periods in the Soviet Union and war-time Angola as a secretary and commissar, he rose through the ranks of MK, becoming a founding member of the military intelligence unit and later deputising Ronnie Kasrils as deputy chief of the unit. From 1987 to 1988, he chaired the military subcommittee of the ANC's Politico-Military Council for the Lesotho region, under the overall leadership of Charles Nqakula, and he also served on the regional Politico-Military Council in Botswana, chaired by Thabang Makwetla. During the same period, he and his wife were appointed to a specialised structure established to govern MK's activities in the Western Cape.

In 2010, Ngculu published The Honour to Serve: Recollections of an Umkhonto Soldier, a memoir of his time in MK. It was shortlisted for that year's Alan Paton Award. He was also a friend of MK commander Chris Hani, who was assassinated in 1993, and in 2014, he and Gregory Houston co-edited a volume of Hani's writings for HSRC Press's Voice of Liberation series.

== Post-apartheid political career: 1994–2009 ==
=== ANC Provincial Secretary: 1994–1998 ===
After the ANC was unbanned by the South African government during the negotiations to end apartheid, Ngculu served two terms as provincial secretary of the Western Cape branch of the ANC from 1994 to 1998, gaining election in 1994 and re-election in 1996. In April 1998, he was ousted from the position by Mcebisi Skwatsha.

=== Member of Parliament: 1998–2009 ===
In 1998, after losing his party office, Ngculu was sworn in to an ANC seat in the National Assembly, filling a casual vacancy. The ANC's Gertrude Fester later alleged that his ascension to the seat "exemplified the androcentrism of the ANC", insofar as the ANC, reshuffling its party list to nominate him to the position, had promoted him over women candidates including Fester and Mildred Lesiea. He was re-elected to full terms in the National Assembly in the 1999 and 2004 general elections, standing as a candidate on the ANC's national party list.

==== Health Committee: 1999–2009 ====
Ngculu served as chairperson of the Portfolio Committee on Health during the second democratic Parliament from 1999, and the ANC reappointed him that position after the 2004 election. The central issue confronting the health portfolio during that period was the HIV/AIDS epidemic and the controversial, and arguably denialist, response of the government under President Thabo Mbeki and Health Minister Manto Tshabalala-Msimang. The Treatment Action Campaign frequently petitioned the committee to take stronger action on HIV/AIDS, and Nathan Geffen, a leading activist in the campaign, later said that the committee had been difficult to work with under Ngculu's leadership, alleging that Ngculu "had little interest in holding the Health Department or its minister to account, despite this being a key purpose of the committee".

In August 2007, Ngculu was among the ANC MPs who defended Minister Tshabalala-Msimang and attacked the Sunday Times after the newspaper, then under the editorship of Mondli Makhanya, controversially published reports that Tshabalala-Msimang had a drinking problem. In October of that year, after Sandra Botha of the opposition Democratic Alliance tabled a motion calling for an inquiry into Tshabalala-Msimang's fitness to hold office, Ngculu proposed successfully to amend the motion to express full confidence in Tshabalala-Msimang; speaking in the house, he accused Botha of "spewing fire that divides this country" and seeking to "embarrass one of us and a person who has been uncompromising in the fight for better health for our people".

==== ANC Provincial Chairperson: 2005–2008 ====
===== Election: 2005 =====
While serving in Parliament, Ngculu remained active in the Western Cape branch of the ANC. As early as January 2001, Ngculu was viewed as a possible challenger to the incumbent provincial chairperson, Ebrahim Rasool, and in October of that year, the ANC Youth League formally endorsed his candidacy. The challenge to Rasool did not proceed at the ANC's 2001 provincial elective conference – amid 11th-hour horse-trading, Ngculu was persuaded to withdraw his candidacy – but it was revived in the run-up to the next elective conference, which, after being delayed several times, was scheduled for June 2005.

During this period, the Western Cape ANC was divided over the management of the region's complex racial demographics. Ngculu's candidacy was supported primarily by the so-called "Africanist" faction of the provincial ANC, which was led by his successor as provincial secretary, Mcebisi Skwatsha, and which supported the instalment of black Africans in the party's top offices. Rasool, by contrast, was Coloured, and others – particularly in the ANC's national leadership – argued that the ANC had to promote Coloured leaders in order to win over the province's sizeable constituency of Coloured voters. Days before the provincial elective conference, Zola Skweyiya, speaking on behalf of the ANC's National Working Committee, addressed a press briefing with what was perceived as a firm endorsement of Rasool and a firm rebuke of any electoral challenge, saying:

We expect stability, politically, and continuity in the province, and that the conference will produce what it has to, what is expected by the leadership of the ANC national. In other words, what we would like to see is that the continuity will mean to a very large extent that the people who have experienced the leadership, exercising leadership in this province, remain where they are, and that we should produce that. In fact, that's an order.

Nonetheless, Ngculu confirmed the following day that he would stand for the provincial chairmanship. That weekend, when the provincial elective conference was held at Cape Town's Good Hope Centre, the Africanist camp made a clean sweep of the top positions: Ngculu won the chairmanship, with 274 votes to Rasool's 259, and Skwatsha was re-elected as provincial secretary. Although Rasool accepted the result, some of his supporters alleged that there had been electoral irregularities.

In his acceptance speech, Ngculu vowed to confront disunity in the party, drawing attention to "this question of unity and how sometimes disunity plays itself out and how certain individuals hide behind it and use it to their advantage". However, well into 2006, Ngculu continued to clash with Rasool, who remained in his government office as Premier of the Western Cape; among other things, Ngculu publicly complained that Rasool did not sufficiently consult with or account to the provincial ANC leadership.

===== Loss of Cape Town: 2006 =====
Less than a year into Ngculu's tenure as provincial chairperson, during the March 2006 local elections, the ANC lost control of the City of Cape Town Metropolitan Municipality, in a major coup for the opposition DA and its mayoral candidate, Helen Zille. In the aftermath, the ANC launched an abortive attempt to introduce reforms that would grant executive powers to the mayoral committee, rather than to the mayor, and which would likely have shifted the balance of power in Cape Town back to the ANC. The ANC argued that this reform would make the municipal government more "inclusive" and "representative", a view which Ngculu endorsed, saying that Zille failed to acknowledge that "anyone who is not white" felt excluded in Cape Town. Though the ANC's initiative was proposed by provincial minister Richard Dyantyi, the DA's Kraai van Niekerk accused Ngculu, Skwatsha, and their supporters of having "spearheaded the efforts to undermine the democratically elected government of the city".

===== Polokwane conference: 2007 =====
In 2007, ahead of the ANC's 52nd National Conference, provincial racial issues in the ANC were largely overtaken by the national power struggle between incumbent national President Thabo Mbeki, who sought a third term as ANC president, and former Deputy President Jacob Zuma, who sought to unseat him. In July 2007, IOL reported that the Western Cape ANC was divided over the matter, with Ngculu reportedly welcoming Mbeki's third-term bid while Skwatsha said that the provincial party would not support it. Further indications of Ngculu's support for Mbeki followed, and he ultimately became a key figure in Mbeki's re-election campaign in the Western Cape. Media reports suggested that he was also a key donor to the campaign, although in 2012 he dismissed those claims as "rumours mongered by... 'unnamed sources'".

While Ngculu and Skwatsha were now divided by their support for opposing presidential candidates, Ngculu's support for Mbeki led him into an unlikely alliance with Rasool, his predecessor and formal rival. In August 2007, the duo appeared together at a political rally in Gordon's Bay, where Rasool praised Ngculu for unifying the provincial party. The Mail & Guardian reported that Mbeki had instructed Ngculu to work with Rasool, a long-time Mbeki ally, but Ngculu denied this, saying:

Mbeki never said 'James, you work with Rasool'. The president never requested us to unite. As the leader of the ANC in the province, creating unity here is my job. Whether Mbeki or Zuma is the next ANC leader, I will serve the organisation.

When Mbeki's camp released a list of its preferred candidates for election to the ANC National Executive Committee, both Ngculu and Rasool appeared on Mbeki's slate. However, when the national elective conference was held in December 2007 in Polokwane, neither was elected to the National Executive Committee, and Mbeki was unseated by Zuma, who became ANC president and the party's presumptive presidential candidate.

In the upheaval that followed the conference, Ngculu and Rasool continued their alliance, and Ngculu became a key obstacle to efforts by the pro-Zuma faction to remove Rasool from his office as Premier of the Western Cape. Those efforts nonetheless succeeded in July 2008.

===== Succession: 2008 =====
The Western Cape ANC's own elective conference was scheduled for later in 2008, and Skwatsha emerged as the likely challenger to Ngculu's incumbency as provincial chairperson. When the conference opened on 24 September in Cape Town, Ngculu announced, during his opening address, that he would not stand for election to any leadership positions. Like his closing address at the 2005 conference that had elected him, Ngculu's speech focused on the theme of party unity; he alluded to his own challenges in unifying the provincial party, saying that "initially we tried" to resolve divisions.

The provincial chairmanship went uncontested to Skwatsha, although the vote was boycotted by supporters of Lerumo Kalako, an ally of Ngculu's who had been viewed as a contender. Other top leadership positions were also filled by candidates who had run on Skwatsha's slate and who were likewise viewed as supporters of Zuma.

==== Congress of the People: 2008–2009 ====
After leaving his party office, Ngculu continued to serve as an ordinary MP, although the Mail & Guardian reported that, as a renowned Mbeki ally, he was unlikely to be ranked highly on the ANC's party list in the upcoming general election. The election was to be contested by the Congress of the People (COPE), a new breakaway party that had been formed by Mbeki supporters after the ANC's Polokwane conference, and there were persistent, but unsubstantiated, rumours that Ngculu had defected or would defect to COPE. In January 2009, IOL claimed that Ngculu had been present at the launch of the party's election manifesto in Port Elizabeth, and Simon Grindrod, COPE's head of elections, alleged in July that Ngculu had assisted the party's Western Cape campaign team ahead of the 2009 election. In his open resignation letter, Grindrod wrote:

Who sets the agenda of COPE? In the case of the Western Cape, it is commonly known that James Ngculu of the ANC drafted, or assisted in drafting, the COPE provincial election strategy... How can the ANC be allowed to play any part in formulating COPE strategy? Members deserve answers to these disturbing questions.

Though he did not defect to COPE, Ngculu left Parliament after the 2009 election.

== Later career ==
=== Political involvement ===
After leaving Parliament in 2009, Ngculu published a handful of academic articles and engaged in sporadic political commentary, notably entering the 2011 debate that followed Jimmy Manyi's comments that Coloured workers were "over-concentrated" in the Western Cape. Ngculu criticised Manyi's remarks as "utterly wrong in both tone and tenor", but joined his criticism to an attack on Solidarity, which he called "a group of the most backward and irreconcilable white supremacists, perhaps coming from the same mould as Manyi".

After the ANC's 54th National Conference in 2017, Ngculu was appointed to the national ANC's internal Integrity Commission, then led by George Mashamba. In 2020, Kebby Maphatsoe of the MK Military Veterans' Association (MKMVA) demanded that Ngculu and Leonard Rasegatla should recuse themselves during commission hearings about inflammatory remarks made by Maphatsoe; Maphatsoe claimed that Ngculu and Rasegatla were members of the MK National Council, an anti-Zuma competitor to MKMVA. Following the ANC's next national conference in 2022, Ngculu was reappointed to another five-year term on the Integrity Commission.

=== Business interests ===
While a sitting MP, Ngculu had held several business interests, including a 6 per cent stake in Great Karoo Metals, a uranium mining company bought by Areva in 2007 and, through his firm Inkwali Asset Management, a stake in Wesizwe Platinum. With businessman Julian Williams, he co-founded a pair of private-equity firms, Abante and Basileus. He was chairman of Basileus in 2012 when Williams was shot dead in his office, and he took over from Williams as chief executive officer. As of 2023, he was a non-executive director at Wesizwe.

== Personal life ==
Ngculu was married to Miranda Ngculu, a former MK activist who died on 29 June 1994. At the time of her death, aged 34, she was a member of the national executive committee of the ANC Women's League. As of 2005, Ngculu lived in Simonstown.
