= EWB =

EWB may refer to:

- Earl Weaver Baseball, a computer game
- Education Without Borders (Canadian organization)
- Education Without Borders (Sudan)
- Engineers Without Borders
- European Western Balkans, a web portal
- New Bedford Regional Airport in Massachusetts, United States
- Exploding Wire Bridge a type of detonator
