= Karl von Hegel =

German historian (1813–1901)

- Born: Friedrich Wilhelm Karl Hegel; 7 June 1813; Nuremberg, Kingdom of Bavaria
- Died: 5 December 1901 (aged 88); Erlangen, Kingdom of Bavaria, German Empire
- Occupation: Historian
- Father: Georg Wilhelm Friedrich Hegel

Friedrich Wilhelm Karl Ritter von Hegel (German: [ˈheːɡl̩]; 7 June 1813 – 5 December 1901) was a German historian and son of the philosopher Georg Wilhelm Friedrich Hegel. During his lifetime he was a well-known and well-reputed historian who received many awards and honours. He was one of the major urban historians during the second half of the 19th century.

== Life and work ==
Karl Hegel was born in Nuremberg. He was the son of the philosopher Georg Wilhelm Friedrich Hegel, who died in 1831, when Karl Hegel was 18 years old. Hegel's own career suffered from the fame of his father. His mother, Marie Helena Susanna von Tucher (1791–1855) came from a long-established Nuremberg family of nobility. Hegel lived his first three years in Nuremberg. The family relocated to Heidelberg in 1816, where his father became Professor of Philosophy. In 1818, they relocated again, this time to Berlin. Karl Hegel studied in Berlin and in Heidelberg. One of his academic teachers was Leopold von Ranke. In 1837, he earned a PhD in Berlin (his Doctor's thesis was about Alexander the Great). From 1838 to 1839, he went to Italy and did many historical researches. Back in Berlin, he worked for a brief time as a high school teacher. From 1841 to 1856, he was Professor for History and Politics at the University of Rostock. In 1847, he published two volumes of the History of Urban Constitution of Italy since the Time of the Roman Empire until the End of the 12th Century. From then on he was a well-known historian of the 19th century. Leipzig University, Kiel University, the Ludwig-Maximilians-Universität München, the University of Greifswald, and the University of Erlangen offered him a professorship. In 1850, he was as elected representative of the Erfurt Parliament. During the same year, he married his cousin Susanna Tucher. In 1856, the University of Erlangen appointed him to the newly created teaching professorship of history. During 1870, he was vice-rector at FAU.

From 1862 to 1899, 27 volumes of the edition “Die Chroniken der deutschen Städte” were published by Karl Hegel for the Historical Commission of the Bavarian Academy of Sciences and Humanities in Munich. Hegel edited six chronicles volumes (Nuremberg, Strasbourg and Mainz) in many parts on his own. With Hegel as a department manager, the edition of the chronicles was one of the most successful projects of the Munich Historical Commission at the Royal Academy, which was still young during Hegel's lifetime. Designated historians, specialists in German studies and jurists such as Karl Lamprecht, Georg von Below, Matthias Lexer or Ferdinand Frensdorff were his employees.

During the 1870s, he participated in the controversy about the authenticity of the Florentine chronicle of Dino Compagni. Paul Scheffer-Boichorst was his antagonist. Hegel argued for the authenticity of this chronicle, and was right.

Hegel did not publish until he was very old. In 1891, he published Cities and Guilds of the Germanic peoples in the Middle Ages. This representation was a standard work with good international reviews and reputation (for example: Friedrich Keutgen: 'Städte und Gilden der Germanischen Völker im Mittelalter'. In: The English Historical Review 8 (1893), pp. 120–127). In 1898, his last monograph was published, The Origin of the German Town Life. Hegel received numerous awards for his research.

In 1875, he became a member of the Central Directorate of Monumenta Germaniae Historica. He was also a member of the Academies in Munich, Göttingen, Berlin and Vienna. The University of Halle-Wittenberg gave him an honorary doctorate. In 1872, he received the Order of Merit of St. Michael and in 1876, the Bavarian Maximilian Order for Science and Art. In 1889, he received the Knight's Cross of the Order of Merit of the Bavarian Crown. In 1891, he was inducted into the Matricula of the Kingdom of Bavaria, and in 1893 he was appointed Royal Privy Council. As early as 1884, the Conversations-Lexicon described him as a "well-known professor of history".

In 1900, he published his memoirs. He died on 5 December 1901, in Erlangen. In 1901, the dean of the philosophic faculty of the University of Erlangen Richard Fester honored him in his funeral eulogy about Karl Hegel as "Städtehegel". His scientific estate is located largely in the Manuscript Department of the University Library of the University of Erlangen–Nuremberg. Karl Hegel remained less well known than his father. His scientific work can be described by the formula "fame without posthumous fame".

On the 100th anniversary of his death, the University of Erlangen Chair of Modern History hosted together with the University of Erlangen's University Library the exhibition Karl Hegel - historian in the 19th century from 20 November to 16 December 2001. Karl Hegel Memorial Lectures have taken place since 2007. Thus, the current department keeps the founder of the Historical Institute of the University of Erlangen–Nuremberg in memory. The Department of History at the University of Erlangen–Nuremberg is researching Karl Hegel's life in several studies Helmut Neuhaus. In 2012, Marion Kreis published her book on Karl Hegel's historiographical significance and ends with this "meritorious study" this desideratum.

== Bibliography ==
A list of publications can be found in Marion Kreis, Karl Hegel. Historical Scientific Importance and history of science location. Göttingen 2012, p 354–359.

- Geschichte der Städteverfassung von Italien seit der Zeit der römischen Herrschaft bis zum Ausgang des zwölften Jahrhunderts (Leipzig 1847, Neudruck 1964, 2 Bände)
- Verfassungsgeschichte von Cöln im Mittelalter (Leipzig 1877) und von Mainz (1882).
- Geschichte der mecklenburgischen Landstände bis zum Jahr 1555 (Rostock 1856)
- Die Ordnungen der Gerechtigkeit in der florentinischen Republik (Erlangen 1867)
- Die Chronik des Dino Compagni. Versuch einer Rettung (Leipzig 1875) und
- Über den historischen Werth der älteren Dante-Commentare mit e. Anh. zur Dino-Frage (Leipzig 1878).
- Städte und Gilden der germanischen Völker im Mittelalter (in German). Leipzig: Duncker & Humblot. 1891 – via HathiTrust., 2 Bände
  - v.1: England, Denmark, Sweden, Norway
  - v.2: France, Netherlands, Germany
- Die Entstehung des Deutschen Städtewesens (Leipzig 1898)
- Karl Hegels Gedenkbuch. Lebenschronik eines Gelehrten des 19. Jahrhunders, hg. von Helmut Neuhaus, Böhlau Verlag, (Köln u.a. 2013), ISBN 978-3-412-21044-1

=== Editions ===
- Helmut Neuhaus: Die Brautbriefe Karl Hegels an Susanna Maria von Tucher. Aus der Verlobungszeit des Rostocker Geschichtsprofessors und der Nürnberger Patriziertochter 1849/50 (= Archiv für Kulturgeschichte. Beihefte. Heft 87). Böhlau, Köln u. a. 2018, ISBN 978-3-412-51128-9.
- Helmut Neuhaus: Die Brautbriefe Susanna Maria von Tuchers an Karl Hegel. Aus der Familiengeschichte der Nürnberger Patrizierfamilie Tucher von Simmelsdorf 1849/50 (= Archiv für Kulturgeschichte. Beihefte. Heft 97). Böhlau Verlag, Wien/Köln 2022, ISBN 978-3-412-52481-4.
