= Fester =

Fester or Fester's may refer to:

- Fester Bestertester, a character created by cartoonist Don Martin
- Fester Hollow, a tributary of the West Branch Briar Creek in Columbia County, Pennsylvania
- Fester Kun Med Mig Selv, a single by Danish singer Jon Nørgaard
- Uncle Fester, or Fester Addams, a member of the fictional Addams Family
- Uncle Fester (author), the nom de plume of Steve Preisler, author
- Fester's Quest, a video game starring Fester Addams

== Surname ==
- Emilia Fester (born 1998), German politician (The Greens)
- Gertrude Fester (born 1952), South African feminist, women's activist and politician
- Richard Fester (1860 – 1945), German historian

== See also ==
- Pus, an exudate formed at the site of inflammation during infection
