= Adam Hlobus =

Belarusian writer (born 1958)

- Адам Глобус
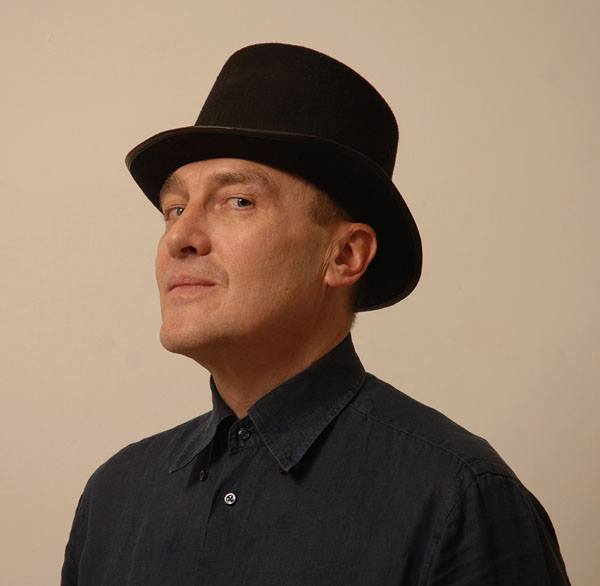
- Born: Vladimir V. Adamchyk; 29 September 1958 (age 67); Dzyarzhynsk, Minsk Region, Byelorussian SSR
- Citizenship: Belarus
- Education: the pedagogical department Minsk Art School them. A. K. Glebov (1973–1977).
- Alma mater: monumental art department of the Belarusian State Academy of Arts
- Occupations: novelist, essayist, painter, artist, publisher.
- Spouse: Alena Adamchyk
- Writing career
- Pen name: Adam Hlobus
- Language: Belarusian, Russian, Ukrainian, English
- Period: 1977–1983
- Genres: story, essay
- Website: adamhlobus.com/

Adam Hlobus (born 29 September 1958 as Vladimir V. Adamchyk, Belarusian: Уладзімір Вячаслававіч Адамчык (transl. Uladzimir Vyachaslavavіch Adamchyk) is a Belarusian writer, novelist, essayist, poet, publisher, and artist.

== Early and personal life ==
Hlobus was born in Dzyarzhynsk Minsk Region in the family of Belarusian writer Vyacheslav Adamchyk (Belarusian: Vyachaslau Adamchyk). He and his family moved to Minsk in 1959, where he grew up. He graduated from the pedagogical department at the Minsk Art School, and the A.K. Glebov (1977) art department of the Belarusian Theatre and Art Institute (1983). He worked as a draftsman, painter and art restorer, graphic designer, and editor of Krynitsa, a publishing house, established in 1987.

He is married to Alena Adamchyk, a Belarusian photographer. He has two children and a grandson.

== Activism ==
He was one of the founding members of the informal association of young writers known as Tuteishyja (Tuteishyja, 1986 – 1990), which was not only a literary group but an active socio-political group as well. Specifically, the union organized a protest against Stalin's repressions called "Forefathers Eve”, during which thousands of Belarusians marched, in October 1988. This became a reoccurring event for Belarusians in the following years. Hlobus was a member of the Writer's Union in 1988 and the Union of Belarusian Writers since 1989.

== Career ==
The first publications of poetry were in 1981 (Weekly Literatura i Mastatstva, journal Maladost). His book Grud, published in 1985, was banned and ruined by the regime representatives. Today the poems and short stories of Hlobus are translated into many languages, and Hlobus's works are published in English, German, Slovenian, Czech, Polish, Russian, Ossetian, and Catalan. In the Russian books Werewolves (released in 1991), Demonokameron (1993), and Lyrics BY clause (2007), they were each composed of poetry translations by Russian poets from Alexander Eremenko, Alexey Parschikov, Vyacheslav Kupriyanov, Dmitry Mizgulin, and lyrical prose translated by Svyatozar Barchenko and Alexey Andreev.

== Bibliography ==
- Grud (1985, Minsk, "Mastackaia litaratura", 64p.) The book was banned by the Soviet censorship and its circulation was destroyed.
- Park (1988)
- Loneliness at the stadium (1989)
- Death – a man (1992)
- Crossroads (1993)
- Domovikomeron (1994)
- Do not tell my mom (1995)
- Koydanovo (1997)
- New domovikomeron (1998)
- Post scriptum (1999)
- Lyrics (2000), a compilation of all previous books
- Braslavskaya Stigmata (2001)
- Notebooks (2003)
- Home, Roman (2005)
- Contemporaries (2006)
- Fairy Tales (2007 Minsk, "Lohvinau" Publishing House, 200p. ISBN 978-985-6800-60-6)
- Adam Hlobus. Lyrics BY. Publisher: Harvest, AST. 2007; ISBN 5-17-043391-3, ISBN 985-16-0753-3 (Russian translation)
- The Castle (2008 Minsk, "Harvest" "Suchasny litaratar" 256p.)
- Convolutus: Lyrics and prose – Minsk: Suchasnyj lіtaratar, 2008. ( The eight books that have been published over the last eight years )
- Play.By. Publisher Igor Loginov 2009
- The New Heaven (2010 Minsk, "Galiafy" 192 p. ISBN 978-985-6906-41-4)
- The fairy Tales of Krutagorje (2010 Minsk, "Lohvinau" Publishing House, 200p. ISBN 978-985-6901-58-7)
- Sentenses (2012 Minsk, "Harvest" 736p. ISBN 978-985-18-0922-2)
- Names (2013 Minsk, "Lohvinau" Publishing House, 122p.)
- The fairy Tales About Grown-ups (2013 Minsk, "Lohvinau" Publishing House, 200p. ISBN 978-985-562-091-5)
- The Novels of Different Years (2014 Minsk, "Lohvinau" Publishing House, 160p.)
- Portraits (2014 Minsk "Галіяфы", 96p. ISBN 978-985-7021-28-4)
- The stories of Minsk and its Surroundings (2015 Minsk, "Lohvinau" Publishing House, 224p. ISBN 978-609-8147-32-2)
- Reverse Perspective (2016 Minsk, "Harvest" 288p. ISBN 978-985-18-3832-1)

== Translated publications ==
- Werewolves (1991 Minsk, "BDPPR" 32p. art magazine ABC №1 Registration number 171), translation by Alena Adamchyk
- Death is a man (1993 Index on Censorship London), translation Vera Rich
- Unser Stadtviertel (1995, Weißrussland – die eroberte Sprache (=Ostara 4). Hannover: Rabenrat-Verlag) translation by Norbert Randow
- Demonicameron tales (1996 Index on Censorship London ISBN 0-904286-51-7) translation Vera Rich
- Demonokameron (1998 Bialystok, "ZB w Rzeczypospolitej Polskiej" ISBN 9788391005804) translation Jan Maksymiuk
- Lyrics BY (2007 Moskou, "AST" 576p. ISBN 978-5-17-043391-9), translation Aleksandr Yaromenko, Alexey Parschikov, Vyacheslav Kupreyanov, Dmitriy Mizgulin, Alexey Andreev, Svyatozar Barchenko
- Bielaruski (2006 Minsk, "Suchasny litaratar" 161-166p. ISBN 985-14-1286-4), translation Wendy Quinn

== Collective collections ==
- Local (1989), a collection of members of the association "The Locals" ( Local )
- All Year Round (1996), a collection of
- The Modern Belarusian Prose (2003)

== Literature ==
- Д.П. (2008). "ГЛОБУС АДАМ (Глобус Адам, Hlobus Adam)". Энцыклапедыя беларускай папулярнай музыкі. уклад. Дз. Падбярэзскі і інш (2000 экз ed.). Мінск: Zmicier Kołas. p. 77. ISBN 978-985-6783-42-8.
