= Kabul Press =

Independent news outlet covering Afghanistan

Kabul Press کابل پرس
- Company type: Independent media organization
- Industry: Mass media
- Founded: 24 December 2003
- Founder: Kamran Mir Hazar
- Headquarters: Norway
- Area served: Regions inhabited by stateless nations and ethnic communities, and their global diasporas
- Key people: Kamran Mir Hazar (Journalist and Director)
- Services: Online News, Investigative Journalism, Human Rights Reporting
- Owner: Kamran Mir Hazar
- Website: Kabul Press

Kabul Press (Dari: کابل پرس) is an independent news outlet founded by Kamran Mir Hazar in 2004. Its editorial operations are based in Oslo, Norway. The outlet publishes in both Dari Persian and English, and focuses on political, social, and human rights issues affecting Afghanistan and the broader region.

Kabul Press highlights the region's diverse ethnic composition, including communities such as the Hazara, Uzbek, Tajik, Turkmen, Pashtun, and Nuristani. It explores how the absence of a cohesive and inclusive national identity has contributed to ongoing conflict, marginalization, and human rights violations. The outlet often challenges dominant narratives shaped by political elites, particularly those that obscure the realities faced by non-Pashtun communities.

The outlet has been at the forefront of advocating for press freedom. Kamran Mir Hazar has faced multiple detentions by regional authorities, attracting attention from press freedom organizations. For instance, he was detained in 2007, leading to condemnations from groups such as the Committee to Protect Journalists and Reporters Without Borders.

Kabul Press has been among the few consistently active media organizations reporting on what a growing number of human rights organizations and legal bodies now recognize as the ongoing Hazara genocide. In August 2024, the American Bar Association unanimously passed Resolution 501, calling on national governments to recognize, halt, and prevent further acts of genocide against the Hazara people. The resolution also urges the U.S. Department of State and international institutions to promote justice and accountability for crimes committed against the Hazara population. Kabul Press continues to play a significant role in amplifying the voices of the global Stop Hazara Genocide movement and in advocating for increased international attention to the plight of the Hazara stateless nation.

== See also ==
- Kamran Mir Hazar
- Censorship in Afghanistan (book)
- Poems for the Hazara
