= Flag of Hazaristan =

Nationalist flag of the Hazara people

Hazaristan
- Flag of Hazaristan
- Adopted: 2013; 13 years ago
- Designed by: Kamran Mir Hazar

The Flag of Hazaristan (Dari, Persian and Hazaragi: پرچم هزارستان / بیرق هزارستان ) is the national flag of Hazaristan and Hazaras. It was originally proposed by Kamran Mir Hazar on Kabul Press in 2013, and later in 2014 presented on the cover of the anthology Poems for the Hazara. Article 37 of the Hazaristan Charter, released by the Pioneers of the Hazaristan Independence Movement on April 11, 2021, is about the Hazaristan Flag.

The Flag of Hazaristan has been extensively used in many countries during the global Hazara protests against the Hazara genocide in Afghanistan. The flag of Hazaristan also has been used by well-known Hazara organizations such as the Hazara National Congress, the Munich Hazara Association, Brisbane's Hazara Community, and the Hazara Council of Great Britain.

Hazaristan, a mountainous region in central Afghanistan, in the Hindu Kush mountain range. Hazaristan is not an independent country, but has been home to the Hazara people since antiquity, first referenced by extant literature in Baburnama, the bi-lingual memoirs of Mughal Emperor Babur (in Persian and Chagatai Turkic)

== Design ==
The color combination of the flag symbolizes the Hazara people's roots and origin, sky, their loyalty, long winter in Hazaristan, their future and development.

== History ==
The Flag of Hazaristan was designed by the Hazara poet and activist Kamran Mir Hazar.

== See also ==
- Hazara nationalism
- Kamran Mir Hazar
- Hazaristan
- Poems for the Hazara
- Flag of Buryatia
