= Harry Koundakjian =

American journalist

Harry Koundakjian (July 11, 1930 – April 21, 2014) was an Armenian news photographer, photojournalist and photo editor.

== Early life and education ==
Koundakjian was born in Syria, but completed high school in neighboring Lebanon.

He and his family moved from the Middle East to New York City in 1979. He worked as a photo editor for the Associated Press until his retirement from the wire service in 2006.

== Career ==
He joined the Associated Press, first as a freelance photographer in 1960s, and then as a full-time staffer beginning in 1969. Koundakjian, who worked for the AP out of the Middle East and New York City, covered the Lebanese Civil War, the 1972 Summer Olympics in Munich, the coronation of the Shah of Iran, and the 1978 wedding of King Hussein of Jordan to Queen Noor. He worked as a photo editor at the AP office in New York City until his retirement in 2006.

== Later life, death, and legacy ==
Harry was moved by the tragic events at 9/11 in New York City in 2001 and he put together a special collection of photographs to record the attack.

He later died from complications of open heart surgery at a hospital in Manhattan, New York City, on April 21, 2014, at the age of 83. He was survived by his wife, daughter and son.

In September 2015, Harry's nephew, Dr. Sam Allen, who was present at 9/11 Ground Zero in 2001 as an emergency medic, wrote a book about his exploits working for 9 days near the scene and used a special collection of iconic photographs taken and compiled by Harry as reminder that we should never forget. The images were sent to Sam before Harry died with a request from him to pass on so that we never forget the day that changed our lives. The book is now available to commemorate the 14th anniversary of this national tragedy.

== See also ==
- Lola Koundakjian
