= Censorship in Afghanistan (book) =

Book by Kamran Mir Hazar

Censorship in Afghanistan سانسور در افغانستان
- First edition
- Author: Kamran Mir Hazar
- Language: Dari language
- Genre: Political
- Publisher: IP Plans
- Publication place: Norway

Censorship in Afghanistan is a book by Hazara poet and journalist Kamran Mir Hazar. The book is written in the Dari language, and is the first book to explore the systematic suppression of free speech in Afghanistan that has been a feature of its ruling authorities for hundreds of years. Norwegian publisher IP Plans has published this book.

== See also ==
- Kamran Mir Hazar
- Kabul Press
