= Kamran Mir Hazar =

Hazara Norwegian poet

Kamran Mir Hazar کامران میرهزار
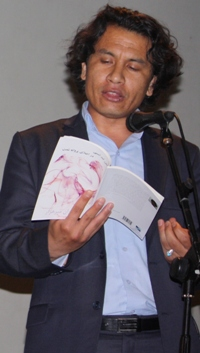
- Born: 1976 (age 49–50); Hazaristan
- Citizenship: Norwegian
- Known for: Poet, journalist, activist
- Website: www.kamranmirhazar.com

Kamran Mir Hazar (Dari/Hazaragi:کامران میرهزار) (born 1976) is a Hazara Norwegian poet, journalist and human rights activist. He is the founder and editor-in-chief of Kabul Press and Refugee Face. He has won various awards for his work and critical reporting, including a Hellman/ Hammett grant from American Human Rights Watch in 2008 and Freedom award from Afghanistan Civil Society Forum in 2007. Kamran Mir Hazar is a member of The Norwegian Writers' Center.

Kamran Mir Hazar has studied Management Information Systems at the University of South-Eastern Norway. He has initiated and founded Digital Hazaristan which aims to establish a Human-Centered Digital Society and a Digital Sovereign Nation.

Kamran Mir Hazar is also the designer of the Flag of Hazaristan. He introduced the flag, first in Kabul Press, then officially published it on the cover of the poetry anthology Poems for the Hazara.

== Journalistic work ==
Kamran Mir Hazar has worked for over 15 years as a journalist, news editor and editor-in-chief. In 2004 he launched Kabul Press which is the most read news website of Afghanistan. In 2005 he started publishing Hot Tea in Kabul. In 2006 he has worked as news editor for a national radio called Killid. A year after he worked for Salam Watandar radio, a radio which is supported by Internews. Refugee Face is another website that he launched in 2011. As a journalist he is also one of The Guardian contributors.

One of Kamran Mir Hazar's books, Censorship in Afghanistan is published by Norway's IP Plans e-Books. This book was written in the Dari language, it is the first book to explore the systematic suppression of free speech in Afghanistan that has been a feature of its ruling authorities for hundreds of years. Kamran Mir Hazar himself was detained twice, threatened by security agents in Afghanistan. The Kabul Press website is also blocked and banned in Afghanistan and Iran. Kabul Press is accessible only via non-governmental ISPs in Afghanistan. It can be reached indirectly from Iran and Afghanistan for those who use government internet service.

== Literary work ==
Kamran Mir Hazar has published two poetry collections. The first one's name is Ketab e Mehr and the second one is làhne tonde àsbi dàr ezlâye pàrvâneh shodàn. He has published also a book titled Reading and Writing which is on literary criticism and new generation of Afghanistan literature. He has attended to several international literary events such as Poetry International Festival, Rotterdam Netherland and the International Poetry Festival of Medellin, Colombia. Kamran Mir Hazar has established Raha Pen in 2002. in July 2012, a collection of Kamran Mir Hazar's poetries have been translated and published in Spanish. This collection is titled Chorro De Ciervos. Book Stream of Deer which is an English version of his poems published in 2014. In 2014, a poetry anthology and a collaborative poem titled Poems for the Hazara published by Kamran Mir Hazar. 125 poets from 68 countries have contributed to this book.

== See also ==
- List of Hazara people
- Poems for the Hazara
- Flag of Hazaristan
- Kabul Press
- Censorship in Afghanistan (book)
- Censorship in Afghanistan
