= Randall van den Heever =

South African politician and trade unionist (born 1950)

Member of the National Assembly
- In office May 1994 – May 2009

Deputy Provincial Chairperson of the Western Cape African National Congress
- In office June 2005 – September 2008
- Chairperson: James Ngculu
- Preceded by: Nomatyala Hangana
- Succeeded by: Lynne Brown

Personal details
- Born: Randall Paul Zachariaden van den Heever; 15 August 1950 (age 75)
- Citizenship: South Africa
- Party: African National Congress

Randall Paul Zachariaden van den Heever (born 15 August 1950) is a South African politician and former trade unionist. Formerly the general secretary of the South African Democratic Teachers' Union (Sadtu), he represented the African National Congress (ANC) in the National Assembly from 1994 to 2009. He also served as deputy provincial chairperson of the ANC's Western Cape branch from 2005 to 2008.

== Early life and career ==
Born on 15 August 1950, van den Heever was a teacher by profession. He rose to prominence as the general secretary of Sadtu during the early 1990s, and he was arrested during a 1992 union sit-in.

== National Assembly: 1994–2009 ==
In South Africa's first post-apartheid elections in 1994, van den Heever was elected to represent the ANC in the National Assembly. He served three terms in his seat, gaining re-election in 1999 and 2004; though elected off the ANC's national party list, he manned the party's constituency office in the Northern Cape's Karoo District.

== Western Cape ANC: 2005–2008 ==
At an early stage in his third term in Parliament, van den Heever was drawn into factional infighting in the Western Cape branch of the ANC, then divided between supporters of incumbent provincial chairperson Ebrahim Rasool and supporters of Rasool's rival, provincial secretary Mcebisi Skwatsha. In May 2005, Skwatsha's ally, Max Ozinsky, chaired a meeting of the pro-Skwatsha camp which devised a slate of candidates for election to top leadership positions in the provincial party; van den Heever appeared on the list, initially as the slate's candidate for election as deputy provincial secretary.

When the Western Cape ANC held its next provincial elective conference in June of that year, Skwatsha's slate made a clean sweep of the top positions, and van den Heever was elected to deputise James Ngculu as deputy provincial chairperson. He served a single term in the party office and was replaced by Lynne Brown at the ANC's next provincial elective conference in September 2008.
