= Education Without Borders (Spanish organization) =

- Educación Sin Fronteras
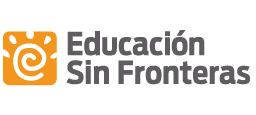
- Abbreviation: ESF
- Established: 1988
- Dissolved: 2013; 12 years ago
- Type: NPO
- Headquarters: Barcelona, Spain

Education Without Borders (Spanish: Educación Sin Fronteras, ESF), was a Spanish non-profit organization established in 1988, active in Central and South America.

ESF was a secular non-profit organization consisting primarily of professionals in the fields of education and cooperation, whose objective was to foster the active participation of different sectors of society to build a more just, equitable, and supportive world. It established itself as a leading organization on educational issues and in the defense and promotion of the right to quality education for all. It understood education not only as a fundamental human right and a basic need, but also as the main tool for the transformation and development of individuals and communities.

In 2013, ESF merged with the fellow Barcelona-based NGO Intervida to create the Educo Foundation (Spanish: Fundación Educo).

ESF is a member of the Coordination Development NGO's of Spain (CONGDE), and is subject to the code of conduct which regulates the activities of its member groups. In March 2007, ESF received the classification by the International Cooperation Agency of Spain (Spanish: Agencia Española de Cooperación Internacional) (AECI) as an NGO specialized in education.

== Development Cooperation Projects ==
International cooperation was one of Education Without Borders' lines of work, and it carried out local development projects and programs, always through indirect participation and involving local NGOs and the population to implement the actions. It worked with some 30 local NGOs across Latin America.

== Education for Development ==
Under the name of Education for Development, Education Without Borders carried out a series of actions in Spain to raise awareness and consciousness about the problems affecting countries in the global south, generate supportive and committed attitudes, and influence different levels of government to promote policies aimed at correcting inequalities in the world in areas such as education, sustainable development, equality, human rights, gender equity, cultural exchange, and responsible consumption, among others.

== Campaigns ==
Education Without Borders participated in awareness-raising and advocacy campaigns on various issues related to the universal right to education and combating global inequalities, including the Global Campaign for Education and Zero Poverty. It also promoted its own campaigns demanding quality public education in Spain and opposing economic cuts in this area, such as "¡Lo que hay que Wert!"

== Collaboration ==
The organization offered various forms of collaboration and funding, with the voting membership system being the most important. It also included collaboration with companies and access to public funding from various local and international organizations.

== See also ==
- Education Without Borders (Sudan)
- Education Without Borders (Canadian organization)
