= Károly Fellinger =

- Born: 1963 (age 62–63); Bratislava, Czechoslovakia
- Writing career
- Genres: Poetry, tales, prose
- Notable works: Külön bejárat (2015), Kincsesláda (2015), Bétonnière ivre (2015), Humility (2014), Alázat (2013), Rész és egész (2012)
- Notable awards: Tibor Simkó Prize (2017), Madách Award (2016), Imre Forbáth Prize (2014), Arany Opus Prize (2010)

Károly Fellinger (born 1963) is a Slovak poet, writer and local historian of Hungarian ethnicity.

== Life and works ==
Born in Bratislava, Károly Fellinger lives in Jelka since his childhood. During his high school years in the Hungarian Academic Grammar School of Galanta, he was the editor in chief of the school journal and the founding editor of the quarterly review Words of Jelka (Jelčianské slovo) between 1993 and 2003. He used to work as an agronomist, now he runs his own smallholding. He has published 20 books in Hungarian so far. Most of them are collections of poems for adults and children, a village monograph and tales. As a mythographer, he collected the tales and legends of Mátyusföld (region of the Mátyus, Matúšova zem). His volumes of poetry have been published in English, German, Romanian, Serbian, French, Russian, Slovak and Turkish. He has been awarded the Golden Opus Prize of the SZMÍT (Hungarian Writers' Association of Slovakia) twice and the Imre Forbáth Prize for the best collection of poetry written in Hungarian in 2014. In 2013, he was the winner of the Bóbita poetry contest of the Hungarian Writers' Association. He was a deputy of the municipal council for twenty years and the deputy mayor for years.

In 2014, his volume of selected poetry was translated in English and published in Canada. His poem was featured in the international anthology Poems for the Hazara in 2014. In the same year, Károly Pallai devoted an English language analysis to the poetry of Fellinger. His first collection of poems in French was published by the prestigious Éditions du Cygne in Paris (Bétonnière ivre, 2015). In 2016, he received the prestigious Madách Award of the Slovak Literary Fund for his collection of poems Különbejárat. In 2016, he was the only Slovak author to be published in the 2015 edition of the World Poetry Yearbook (China). In 2016, his poems were selected and published in the yearly anthology of the Hungarian Writers' Association of Slovakia. In 2016, his poems were published in Spain (Dios está ausente) and in Canada (Sieve of Light in the Pine Forest), and a volume of his best poems (Fellinger Károly legszebb versei) was also released.

In 2017, his tales were published in a bilingual, Hungarian-English edition (A Kincsesláda-The Treasure Chest). His poems were featured in Empty Mirror and Setu (United States), Sipay (Seychelles), A New Ulster (Northern Ireland), Ygdrasil (Canada) and in the prestigious Belgian review Traversées. In 2017, he received the Tibor Simkó Prize of the Hungarian Writers' Association of Slovakia for his collection of tales Ilka vára. In the same year, he was awarded the Medal of the Chairman of the Trnava Self-Governing Region for his contribution to culture. His new poems were published under the title Köti a sötétséget by Media Nova and his second collection of poems in French appeared in Paris (À l'affût de Dieu, Éditions du Cygne). His poem "Elbocsátó" was translated in English by Károly Sándor Pallai and published in the international poetic anthology Amaravati Poetic Prism (India).

He is a member of the Hungarian Writers' Association of Slovakia and of the Hungarian Writers' Association.

== Literary prizes ==
- 2010: Golden Opus Prize (Hungarian Writers' Association of Slovakia)
- 2011: Golden Opus Prize (Hungarian Writers' Association of Slovakia)
- 2013: Bóbita Poetry Prize (Hungarian Writers' Association)
- 2014: Imre Forbáth Prize (Hungarian Writers' Association of Slovakia)
- 2016: Madách Award (Literary Fund of Slovakia)
- 2017: Tibor Simkó Prize (Hungarian Writers' Association of Slovakia)
- 2017: Medal of the Chairman of the Trnava Self-Governing Region for cultural contribution

== Major works ==
- 1991: Áramszünet (poetry), Madách, Bratislava, Slovakia
- 1996: Csendélet halottakkal (poetry), Lilium Aurum, Dunajská Streda, Slovakia
- 1997: Égig érő vadkörtefák (tales and poems for children), Lilium Aurum, Dunajská Streda, Slovakia
- 1997: Jóka-nevezetességek, Honismereti Kiskönyvtár, Komárno, Slovakia
- 2004: Fészek az égen (poetry), Lilium Aurum, Dunajská Streda, Slovakia
- 2006: Fűhárfa (poems for children), Lilium Aurum, Dunajská Streda, Slovakia
- 2008: Szélkergető kerek köpeny (poems for children), Lilium Aurum, Dunajská Streda, Slovakia
- 2009: Hajléktalan búzavirág (tales and legends), Lilium Aurum, Dunajská Streda, Slovakia
- 2010: Dióbölcső, mákfejcsörgő (poems for children), Lilium Aurum, Dunajská Streda, Slovakia
- 2011: Csomagmegőrző (selected poems), Mosonvármegye Könyvkiadó, Mosonmagyaróvár
- 2011: Mákom van (poems for children), Lilium Aurum, Dunajská Streda, Slovakia
- 2012: Rész és egész (poetry), Lilium Aurum, Dunajská Streda, Slovakia
- 2013: Alázat (selected poems), AB-ART, Okoč, Slovakia
- 2013: Morzsabál (poems for children), Lilium Aurum, Dunajská Streda, Slovakia
- 2013: Demut (poetry in German), Windrose, Frauenkirchen, Austria
- 2013: Poniznost (poetry in Serbian), Umetnicka Scena Siveri Janos, Mužlja, Serbia
- 2014: Csigalépcső (selected poems for children), AB-ART, Okoč, Slovakia
- 2014: Jancsi és Juliska (poems), AB-ART, Okoč, Slovakia
- 2014: Humility (poetry in English), Libros Libertad, Surrey, Canada
- 2014: Din cartea uitarii (poetry in Romanian), Tipo Moldova, Iași, Romania
- 2015: Tevazu (poems in Turkish), Siirden Yayincilik, Istanbul, Turkey
- 2015: Zavesa iz lucsej szveta (poems in Russian), Vest-Konszalting, Moscow, Russia
- 2015: Kincsesláda (tales), AB-ART, Okoč, Slovakia
- 2015: Bétonnière ivre (poems in French), Éditions du Cygne, Paris, France
- 2015: Pokora (poems in Slovak), Hungarian Writers' Association of Slovakia, Dunajská Streda, Slovakia
- 2015: Különbejárat (poems in Hungarian), Media Nova M, Dunajská Streda, Slovakia
- 2016: Kéreggyűjtés (poems in Hungarian), AB-ART, Okoč, Slovakia
- 2016: Ilka vára, Vámbéry Polgári Társulás, Dunajská Streda, Slovakia
- 2016: Dios está ausente (poems in Spanish), Luhu Editorial, Alcoy, Spain
- 2016: Sieve of Light in the Pine Forest (poems in English), Ekstasis Editions, Victoria, Canada
- 2016: Fellinger Károly legszebb versei (poems in Hungarian), AB-ART, Okoč, Slovakia
- 2017: A Kincsesláda – The Treasure Chest (tales in Hungarian-English bilingual edition), AB-ART, Bratislava, Slovakia
- 2017: Köti a sötétséget (poems in Hungarian), Media Nova M, Dunajská Streda, Slovakia
- 2017: À l'affût de Dieu (poems in French), Éditions du Cygne, Paris, France
- 2017: ΦΩΣ ΣΤΙΣ ΠΕΥΚΟΒΕΛΟΝΕΣ poetry by ΚΑΡΟΛΟΣ ΦΕΛΙΝΓΚΕΡ (poems in Greek), OSTRIA, Athens, Greece
- 2018: Mindjárt gondoltam, Vámbéry Polgári Társulás (poems in Hungarian), Media Nova M, Dunajská Streda, Slovakia
- 2018: Hullámvasút, Vámbéry Polgári Társulás (poems in Hungarian), Media Nova M, Dunajská Streda, Slovakia
- 2018: Szimering, Kalligram Kiadó, Bratislava, Slovakia
