= Nyein Way =

Burmese poet

Nyein Way is a poet from Myanmar. His interests include experimental, avant-garde and contemporary Western and European poetry as well as Asian and African poetry, contemporary philosophy and Buddhism. He uses and conceptualizes differences between all of these interests to show the staggering and different realities of gaps in the 21st century.

Way introduced conceptual poetry and poetics in Myanmar, through his "Myanmar Conceptual Poets Station (MCPS)" Facebook page.

== Publications ==
- Poems for the Hazara
