= John Kiely =

John Kiely may refer to:

- John Kiely (baseball) (born 1964), American former Major League Baseball pitcher
- John Kiely (ice hockey) (born 1952), American former professional ice hockey goaltender
- John Kiely (Limerick hurler) (born 1972), Irish hurling manager, hurler and Gaelic footballer
- John Kiely (Waterford hurler) (1927–2004), Irish sportsperson
