= Friedrich Keutgen =

German historian

Friedrich Wilhelm Eduard Keutgen (28 July 1861 – 30 September 1936) was a German historian and professor of history at the University of Hamburg, after his first professorial appointment as professor of medieval and modern history at the University of Jena. He was born at Bremen and studied at Giessen, Göttingen, and Strassburg. He was lecturer at Johns Hopkins University in Baltimore in 1904-05, and organized and became lecturer at the Kolonial Institut Hamburg in 1910. He wrote:

- Die Hansa und England im Vierzehnten Jahrhundert (1890)
- Untersuchungen über den Ursprung der deutschen Stadtverfassung (1895)
- Die Aufgabe der Genealogie (1899)
- Urkunden zur städtischen Verfassungsgeschichte (1901)
- Der Grosshandel im Mittelalter (1902)
- Ämter und Zünfte (1903)
- Handelsgeschichtliche Probleme (1904)
- Britische Reichsprobleme und der Krieg (1914)
- Entstehung des Britischen Weltreichs (1915)
- Das Britische Kolonialreich (1916)
- Der Deutsche Staat des Mittelalters (1918)
