= Vyacheslav Kupriyanov =

Russian poet

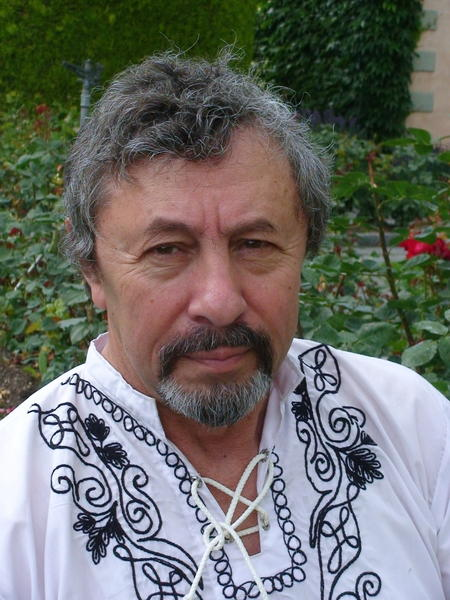
- Born: 23 December 1939 (age 86); Novosibirsk, Soviet Union
- Occupation: Poet

Vyacheslav Glebovich Kupriyanov (Russian: Вячеслав Глебович Куприянов; born 23 December 1939) is a Russian poet.

== Selected works ==
- In Anyone's Tongue, Forest Books, 1993
- Poems for the Hazara, Full Page Publishing, 2014
- English translations of 4 prose poems in OffCourse 69 (Albany.edu)
- English translation of "The Sun" in OffCourse 75 (Albany.edu)
- English translations of 3 prose poems in Plume (August 2017)
