= Stop Hazara Genocide =

Social Movement

#StopHazaraGenocide is a social media campaign that aims to raise awareness and demand action against the persecution and violence faced by the Hazara ethnic group. The campaign was initiated by Hazaras in response to a series of deadly attacks on the Hazara community, especially students and women, by the Taliban and other extremist groups. Since 2017, it has garnered over 50 million retweets.

== Background ==
The Hazara ethnic group mainly inhabit the central and eastern regions of Afghanistan, as well as parts of Pakistan and Iran. They are estimated to make up about 20% of Afghanistan's population. The Hazara are predominantly Shia Muslims with significant Sunni Muslims, which makes them a religious minority in a largely Sunni Muslim country. They have faced a long history of discrimination, oppression, and massacres by various rulers and factions in Afghanistan, including the Taliban regime that ruled from 1996 to 2001.

The Hazara have also been targeted by the Islamic State (IS) group, which considers them as heretics and apostates. Since 2016, IS has claimed responsibility for several attacks on Hazara gatherings, mosques, schools, and neighborhoods, killing hundreds of civilians. The most recent and deadliest attack occurred on October 2, 2022, when a suicide bomber detonated his explosives outside a Hazara education center in Kabul, killing at least 35 people and injuring more than 50 others. Most of the victims were young students who were preparing for university entrance exams.

== Campaign ==
The #StopHazaraGenocide campaign was launched on Twitter by Afghan social media users shortly after the October 2 attack. The campaign aimed to draw attention to the plight of the Hazara and to urge the international community and human rights organizations to intervene and protect them from further violence. The campaign also expressed solidarity with the Hazara victims and their families and condemned the Taliban and IS for their atrocities.

The campaign quickly gained momentum and reached over one million tweets within a few days. It also spread to other platforms such as Facebook, Instagram, and TikTok. The campaign received support from various celebrities, activists, politicians, journalists, and ordinary people from around the world. Some notable figures who joined the campaign include former Afghan president Hamid Karzai, former British prime minister Tony Blair, Pakistani Nobel laureate Malala Yousafzai, Iranian actress Golshifteh Farahani, and Indian cricketer Virat Kohli.

== Protests ==
In addition to the online campaign, several offline protests were also organized by the Hazara community and their supporters in different cities across Afghanistan and abroad. The protesters demanded justice for the victims of the October 2 attack and called for an end to the Hazara genocide

Some of the largest protests took place in Kabul, where thousands of people marched on the streets holding banners and chanting slogans such as "Stop Hazara Genocide" and "We Want Peace". The protests were mostly peaceful, but some clashes occurred between the protesters and the Taliban security forces, who fired shots in the air to disperse the crowds.

Other protests were held in cities such as Herat, Mazar-i-Sharif, Bamyan, Ghazni, Daikundi, and Jaghori, where large numbers of Hazara reside. Protests were also staged in neighboring countries such as Pakistan, Iran, India, Turkey, and Australia, where many Hazara refugees and diaspora live. The protesters expressed solidarity with their fellow Hazara in Afghanistan and urged their governments to take action against the Taliban regime.

== Hazaras Persecuted Under The Taliban Regime ==
Taliban arrest women and girls in Kabul for violating dress code

In January 2024, the Taliban regime in Afghanistan arrested dozens of women and girls in western Kabul, a predominantly Hazara neighborhood, for wearing "bad hijab," which means not covering their faces or wearing tight clothes.This was one of the many official confirmations of crackdowns on women who do not follow the dress code imposed by the Taliban since they returned to power in 2021. The Taliban spokesperson said the women violated Islamic values and rituals and encouraged other women to do the same. The arrested women and girls were either referred to judicial authorities or held in custody until their male relatives guaranteed their compliance with the hijab rules. The Taliban defined the proper hijab as a piece of cloth that covers the entire body except the eyes.

The arrests sparked condemnation from the UN Special Rapporteur on human rights in Afghanistan, who called for the immediate and unconditional release of the detained women and girls. He said the arrests signified further restrictions on women's freedom of expression and rights. The arrests also came amid the Taliban's bans on education, employment, and public spaces for women and girls, which are the harshest since their previous rule from 1996 to 2001. The Taliban also rejected the UN Security Council's proposal for a special envoy to engage with them on gender and human rights issues, saying that such envoys have complicated situations further by imposing external solutions.

== Hazaras persecuted by ISIS ==
The Hazara ethnic group, which is predominantly Shiite Muslim, has faced persecution and violence from the Islamic State of Iraq and the Levant – Khorasan Province (ISIL-KP), a Sunni extremist group that considers them heretics and apostates. ISIL-KP has claimed responsibility for several attacks on Hazara civilians and places of worship in Afghanistan, especially in the western part of Kabul, where many Hazaras reside.

One of the most recent attacks occurred on January 7, 2024, when ISIL-KP detonated an explosive device on a minibus carrying Hazara passengers in the Dashti Barchi neighborhood of Kabul. The blast killed at least five people and wounded 15 others, according to police sources. ISIL-KP said in a statement that the attack was carried out by its members against the "disbelievers" on the bus. This was the first attack by the group in the country in 2024.

The Dashti Barchi area has been repeatedly targeted by ISIL-KP in the past, as it is home to many Hazara schools, hospitals, and mosques. In November 2023, the group claimed responsibility for another minibus explosion in the same area, which killed seven people and wounded 20 others. In October 2023, four people were killed and seven were wounded when an explosion hit a sports club in the neighborhood. ISIL-KP also claimed responsibility for that attack.

The United Nations Assistance Mission in Afghanistan (UNAMA) has condemned the attacks on the Hazara community and called for an end to the targeted violence and discrimination against them. UNAMA also urged the Taliban regime, which controls most of the country, to provide greater protection and accountability for the Hazara victims. The Taliban, however, have been accused of neglecting and marginalizing the Hazaras, who have historically faced oppression and exclusion in Afghanistan.

The Taliban and ISIL-KP have been engaged in a violent rivalry since the former took over Afghanistan in August 2021, following the withdrawal of the US-led coalition forces. The Taliban have claimed to have reduced the attacks by ISIL-KP by 90% in the past year, but the group remains active and resilient, especially in Kabul and the northern provinces. ISIL-KP has also targeted other religious and ethnic minorities, such as Sikhs, Hindus, and Uzbeks, as well as government officials, journalists, activists, and foreign nationals.

January 2024 grenade explosion: On January 11, 2024, a grenade explosion killed two people and wounded 12 others in the Dasht-e-Barchi neighborhood of Kabul, Afghanistan. The blast occurred outside a commercial center in the predominantly Shia area, which has been frequently attacked by the Islamic State group’s affiliate in Afghanistan (ISIL-KP). No group claimed responsibility for the attack, which was the second deadly incident in Dasht-e-Barchi in less than a week. On January 7, ISIL-KP had claimed a minibus explosion that killed at least five people in the same area.

== Impact ==
The #StopHazaraGenocide campaign has been one of the most prominent and influential social media movements in Afghanistan's history. It has raised global awareness about the situation of the Hazara and their suffering under the Taliban rule. It has also shown the resilience and courage of the Afghan people, especially the youth, women, and minorities, who have continued to voice their demands for peace, justice, and human rights despite the threats and challenges they face.

The campaign has also put pressure on the Taliban government to address the grievances of the Hazara community and to ensure their safety and representation. The Taliban have claimed that they have changed their policies towards the Hazara and other minorities since they took over power in August 2021. They have also promised to investigate the October 2 attack and to punish those responsible for it. However, many observers remain skeptical about the Taliban's sincerity and ability to protect the Hazara from further violence.

The campaign has also called for the international community and human rights organizations to intervene and support the Hazara and other vulnerable groups in Afghanistan. The campaign has urged the United Nations, the European Union, the United States, and other countries to impose sanctions on the Taliban regime and to provide humanitarian aid and assistance to the Afghan people. The campaign has also appealed to the international media and civil society to continue to monitor and report on the human rights situation in Afghanistan and to hold the Taliban accountable for their actions.
