= Germain Droogenbroodt =

Belgian poet

- Born: 11 September 1944 (age 81) Rollegem, Belgium
- Occupation: Poet; Translator
- Citizenship: Belgium

Germain Droogenbroodt is a Belgian poet born 11 September 1944 in Rollegem, in the Flemish part of Belgium. Apart from being a poet, he is both a translator and a publisher. He became known as a translator for his rendition of the poems of Rose Ausländer, Sarah Kirsch, Peter Huchel, etc.

Droogenbroodt has also published numerous volumes of poetry by modern poets from various regions of the world in the POINT publishing house (POesie INTernational) over a period of more than 30 years.

He was secretary-general of the World Literature Congress in Valencia, is secretary-general of the World Academy of Arts & Culture (WAAC) and he is a member of the board of the World Congress of Poetry, founded in 1969 by Amado Yuzon, Krishna Srinivas, Lou Lutour and Tin- wen Chung.

Germain Droogenbroodt has published around a dozen volumes of poetry, not counting the translated volumes of his poetry published abroad.

== Life and work ==
The yearbook The Low Countries: Art and Society in Flanders and the Netherlands makes reference to the poet. But as someone who has not lived in Belgium for decades and who may have had too few contacts there, Droogenbroodt received more attention and also gained more recognition abroad.

The Chinese poet Bei Dao 北岛 dedicated an entire chapter to this "Belgian poet"

In his book Midnight's Gate (Wu ye shi men), the poet Bei Dao describes Droogenbroodt there as a "hedonist" who "fell in love with the most painful of all things: poetry."

In his book I Am The Dewdrop, I Am The Ocean, the Indian poet and artist Satish Gupta not only called Droogenbroodt the "founder of Point Editions", but also referred to him as a "Mediterranean poet and linguist".

José Luis Ferris refers to Droogenbroodt as the translator of Rafael Carcelén's poems.

The poet and translator Germain Droogenbroodt is also mentioned in the book Mit dem Wort am Leben hängen: Reiner Kunze zum 65. Geburtstag (Hanging on to life with the word: for Reiner Kunze on his 65th birthday), edited by Marek Zybura: Reiner Kunze on his 65th birthday.

In the book Women Between Two Worlds: Portraits, Conversations, Interviews by Gabriele Hefele, the author erroneously calls Germain Droogenbroodt "a Dutch poet".

Not only because he is a multilingual poetry translator, but also as a poet, Germain Droogenbroodt is an author between two (or more) worlds.

A book by the Chinese poet Hai An states that Droogenbroodt visited China on several occasions and promoted exchanges between Chinese and Western poetry.

In the book Wǒde xīn shìjì shī lù (My New Century Poetry Road) by the poet Li Kuixian (李魁賢), who was born in 1937 and whose name is transcribed in Taiwan as Li Kuei-hsien, Germain Droogenbroodt is also mentioned. Li emphasizes Droogenbroodt's involvement in cultural activities in Taiwan and underlines his role as a poet, translator, and critic. Germain Droogenbroodt's poetry book Counterlight was published in Chinese In Taipei in 2007. The poems in the book were translated by Bei Dao, Gong Hua (= Karen Kung), and Zhao Zhenkai (= Bei Dao !) together with the author. Bei Dao also translated Droogenbroodt's poetry collection The Road - a nod to the concept of "Tao" - into Chinese. Thanks to Ganga Prasad Vimal, the poetry book The Road is also available in English and Hindi.

Fuad Rifka translated a volume of poetry by Droogenbroodt into Arabic; Jana Stroblova and Josef Hruby translated a volume of his poetry into Czech and Milan Richter translated it into Slovak. As editor, Emilio Coco also created a volume of poems by the Belgian author entitled Sorge il cantore: amanence el cantor. This volume was published in Bari in 2001 by the Levante publishing house in the Quaderni della valle series. The texts of the volume are printed partly in Italian, partly in Spanish and also in Dutch). An Irish edition of poetry by the Belgian author is particularly noteworthy. It's the book Sruth an Ama. The subtitle is: Irish-language versions by Gabriel Rosenstock of selected poems by Germain Droogenbroodt. The book was published in Dublin in 2011 as an e-book.

=== Anthologies ===
- Various authors (2023). Jarquín, Carlos Javier (ed.). Canto planetario: hermandad en la Tierra. Costa Rica: HC Editores. ISBN 979-8850092115.

== Honors and awards ==
- In 1995, Droogenbroodt was a recipient of a Hawthornden Fellowship in Scotland.
- For his book Conversation with the Hereafter he received the Buckinx Price.
- He was „Laureate“ of the 29th Premio de Poesia Juan Alcaide In Spain.
- He also received the PEGASUS PRICE of the Mongolian Academy for Culture and Poetry
- and he received an Honorary Doctorate in Cairo.
