= Education Without Borders (Canadian organization) =

Charity based in Canada

- Abbreviation: EwB
- Formation: 2002
- Founder: Cecil and Ruth Hershler
- Headquarters: Vancouver, Canada
- Website: educationwithoutborders.ca

Education Without Borders (EwB), is a global non-profit organization established in 2002 in Vancouver, Canada by South African expatriates Cecil and Ruth Herschler. The vision of EwB is to empower at-risk children around the world by instilling a love of learning through educational opportunities. Its initial focus was Fezeka Secondary school in Guguletu, Cape Town, South Africa. Education without Borders provides educational opportunities for disadvantaged and at-risk children through initiatives in South Africa and Canada, including after-school support programs in Math, English, Science, school leadership and youth mentorship.

== See also ==
- Education Without Borders (Spanish organization)
- Education Without Borders (Sudan)
