= Lola Koundakjian =

Armenian poet

- Born: Beirut, Lebanon
- Education: Hunter College (B.A.); Columbia University (M.A.)
- Occupations: poet, author, artist
- Known for: poetry, editing, painting
- Notable work: The Accidental Observer
- Parent(s): Harry Koundakjian; Aida Poladian Koundakjian.
- Website: lolakoundakjian.com

Lola Koundakjian (Armenian: Լօլա Գունտաքճեան) is an Armenian poet. Koundakjian was born in Beirut, Lebanon and has resided in New York City since 1979. She writes in Western Armenian, her mother tongue, and English. She has organized evenings dedicated to the Dead Armenian Poets Society since her university days, and has curated the online Armenian Poetry Project since 2006.

A regular reader in New York City and its tri-state area, Koundakjian has appeared in several international poetry festivals: in Buenos Aires, Argentina (2022); Santiago, Chile (2019); Medellin, Colombia, 2010; Lima, Peru, 2013; Ramallah, West Bank, 2013; and Trois-Rivières, Quebec, Canada, 2014. Her translations of modern Istanbul poets have been included in Western Armenian language teaching manuals.

Lola has received two grants from the Northern Manhattan Arts Alliance, New York, USA, and the Naji Naaman Literary Prize in Lebanon. She is also the author of the Armenian/English poetry collection The Accidental Observer, which includes translations in Spanish.

Koundakjian's second book, Advice To A Poet, was a finalist in Armenia's Orange Book Prize in 2012 and was published in 2015 by Amotape Libros in Lima, Peru. Her most recent book was published in 2020 by Nueva York Poetry Press and is entitled The Moon in the Cusp of My Hand; it won the 2021 Minas and Kohar Tölölyan Prize in Contemporary Literature.
