= Wesizwe Platinum =

South African mining company

- Industry: Mining
- Website: www.wesizwe.co.za

Wesizwe Platinum is a mining business in South Africa. It has significant platinum group metal deposit on the Bushveld Igneous Complex.

== Frischgewaagd-Ledig ==
Wesizwe has access to substantial platinum reserves at the Bakubung platinum mine site near Rustenburg in the Western limb of the Bushveld Igneous Complex. It is expected to produce 350,000 ounces of Platinum group metals per year.

In May 2011, a financing deal worth nearly $1bn was agreed with a consortium of Chinese investors; Wesizwe now has the Jinchuan Group and CADFund as its major shareholders. This deal would allow work to start on platinum production at the Bakubung Platinum Mine.

In January 2013, Wesizwe Platinum confirmed that it had received a $650 million loan from the China Development Bank for the development of the Bakubung project. Part of the loan would be used to refund two separate $100-million short-term loans, which CDB and Wesizwe signed in December 2012.
