= Ivan Djeparoski =

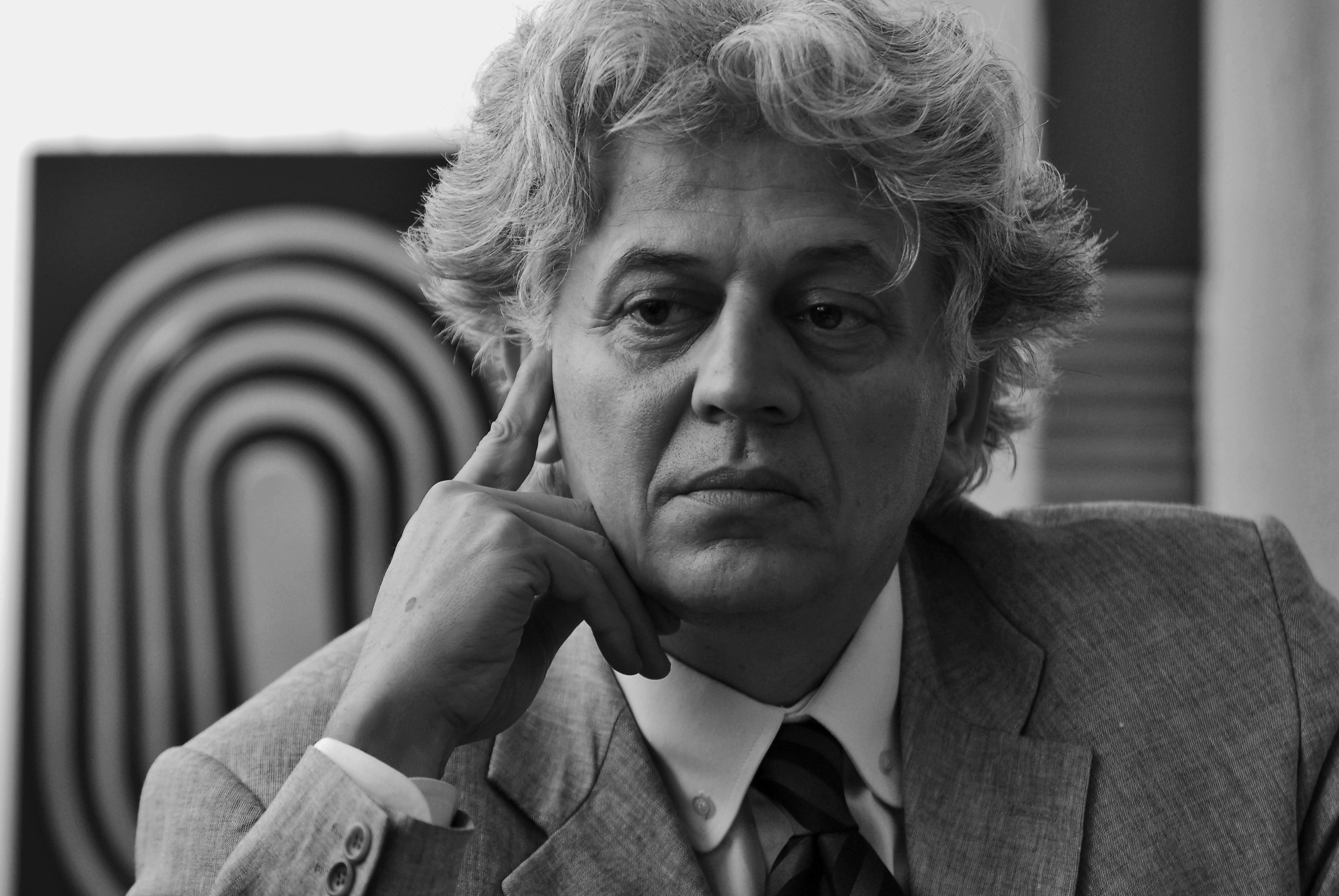
Ivan (Ivica) Djeparoski

Ivan (Ivica) Djeparoski(born 1958 in Skopje, Republic of Macedonia) is a philosopher, cultural theorist, poet and translator. He graduated from the Faculty of Philosophy in Skopje where he received his M.A. and Ph.D. He is an author of fourteen books in the field of aesthetics and cultural theory, five poetry books and also of two poetry anthologies, for which he was awarded the "Mlad Borec Prize" (1984), "Dimitar Mitrev Prize" (1993) and “Paradigm Prize” (2009). He works at the Faculty of Philosophy in Skopje as a professor of "Aesthetics", "History of Aesthetics" and "Cultural Theories". He is/was Head of the Institute of Philosophy (2004-2009; 2013-), Head of postgraduate studies of the Institute of philosophy (2010-2013) and secretary of Macedonian P.E.N. Centre. (1999-2001; 2009-2014). He also translates (William Blake, Joseph Brodsky, James Joyce, David Hume, Edmund Burke). He was granted the "Grigor Prlicev Award" (1993) for a poetic rendition as well as the „Miladinov Brothers” award (2017) for the best poetry book The Light of Mount Athos, written in Macedonian. His poetry and some of his essays are translated into several languages.

== Bibliography ==
=== Books in philosophy ===
- Argo Sails Down the Axios, Skopje: Misla, 1984;
- In Search of Lost Totality, Skopje: Kultura, 1993;
- The Work of Art, Skopje: Kultura, 1998, (second edition) Skopje: Magor, 2009;
- Beyond the System, Skopje: Kultura, 2000;
- Philosophical Stories, Skopje: Magor, 2001;
- The Young, the Sacral and the Art (co-author), Skopje: Templum, 2003;
- Aesthetics of Play (ed.), Skopje: Kultura, 2003;
- Beauty and Art (ed.), Skopje: Magor, 2005;
- Issues of Otherness (ed.), Skopje: Menora-Evro Balkan Press, 2007;
- Aesthetics of the Sublime, Skopje: Magor, 2008;
- Macedonian Essay (ed.), Bitola: Mikena, 2008;
- Attitude and Essence, Skopje: Dijalog, 2010;
- Sveto Manev, Skopje: Djurdja, 2013;
- Discourses of Visuality, Skopje: Matica makedonska, 2014;
- Culture and Literature, Skopje: Magor, 2016

=== Poetry books ===
- Pictures at an Exhibition, Skopje: Nasa kniga, 1989;
- Eclogues, Skopje: Makedonska kniga, 1992;
- Poems, Skopje: Detska radost, 1998;
- Will for Thought, Bitola: Mikena, 2008;
- The Abduction of Europe, Skopje: Dijalog, 2012.
- The Light of Mount Athos, Skopje:Magor, 2015, tr.English Sruga:SVP, 2016, tr.Serbian Belgrade: Gramatik 2018.
- Poetry anthologies: Beautiful Words, Skopje: Detska radost, 1993,3rd ed.2017 Skopje:Prosvetno Delo;
- Anthology of Tears, Skopje: MakeDox, 2012.
