= Kevin Kiely (poet) =

British writer (born 1953)

- Born: 2 June 1953 (age 73); Warrenpoint, Northern Ireland
- Occupations: Poet, novelist, critic, playwright

Kevin Kiely (born 2 June 1953) is a poet, critic, author and playwright whose writings and public statements have met with controversy and also with support.

== Early life ==
Kiely was born on 2 June 1953 in Warrenpoint, County Down, Northern Ireland. His grandfather's brother was the Olympian John Jesus Flanagan, inventor of the hammer for Slazenger America as used in the Olympic Games, and three-times record-breaking gold medallist. Kiely's childhood was spent in many parts of Ireland, due to his father's work as manager with the Munster & Leinster Bank. Aged 8, he was sent to Wimbledon, London to his aunt. In 1963 on the death of his father, John Francis Kiely, he was in the care of his guardian and uncle, Edward Vaughan-Neil who sent him to Mt St. Joseph's Abbey, Roscrea where he was a boarder from 1966 to 1969. He completed his education in Blackrock College, Dublin, from 1969 to 1971.

== Wandering, work, academic life ==
He became a field study technician for Smedley HP in Cambridgeshire 1973–1975 and wandered in Europe working part-time at various jobs while reading in the national libraries of many countries, but otherwise mainly residing in Paris and London. Kiely attended University College Galway in 1976, participating on the Art Council-funded National Writers Workshop, taught Literature in Colegio Xaloc, Barcelona and was made an honorary fellow of Iowa University in 1983. He holds a Masters in Literature from Trinity College in 2005 and a PhD from University College Dublin in 2009. His doctoral thesis on John L. Sweeney: Patron of Poetry at Harvard's Woodberry Poetry Room gained him an American Fulbright Award in 2007, enabling years of full-time lecturing at American universities including Boise State University and the University of Idaho, and research at Harvard. The doctoral thesis formed the basis of Harvard's Patron: Jack of All Poets an A-Z critical study of modernist American poets associated with The Edward Woodberry Poetry Room Harvard University. Sweeney as Irish-American millionaire and patron, greatly contributed in terms of patronage to poets E. E. Cummings, Robert Frost, Ezra Pound, Wallace Stevens and many others which Kiely prefigured in various essays discussing poets and their patrons before the publication of Harvard's Patron: Jack of All Poets (2018).

== Writings ==
Kiely co-edited The Belle, a counter-cultural magazine, with Maurice Scully from 1978 to 1979. He moved from Dublin to Spain where he taught at Colegio Xaloc and gave public lectures on poetry and literature.

Quintesse, published in 1982 in Dublin by Co-Op Books, found a New York publisher in 1985. During this period he was invited to the University of Iowa on the International Writing Programme Fellowship working with the American poet Paul Engel as well as poets Gary Snyder, Marvin Bell and Jorie Graham. Mere Mortals, an experimental pastiche of the post-Joycean novel, was published in 1989 in Dublin.

With publication of the biography of Francis Stuart author of the Penguin Classic Black List, Section H one of twenty-five novels, Kiely found support and condemnation because of Stuart's conflicted life including the Second World War era in Berlin broadcasting at Haus des Rundfunks which had earned him the scandalous epithet the Irish Lord Haw-Haw. While the book was extensively reviewed, the long existing controversy over Stuart became amplified into further controversy. The book titled Francis Stuart: Artist and Outcast came out in Ireland and America, and Kiely's stance was seen by some as "diplomatic" whereas some others suggested that Kiely was "not writing the book that more opinionated readers, eager to prove Stuart's lapses, would have demanded." The re-issue of the revised edition of the Stuart biography in 2017 alongside Geoffrey Elliott's biography of John Lodwick brought to public attention the Stuart-Lodwick association of writers who took different sides in WWII and thereafter formed an ideological friendship.

Kiely's poetry such as the collection Breakfast with Sylvia, published in 2005 received the Kavanagh Fellowship in 2006, was highly praised in America and Ireland by leading poets, 'Kiely has a reputation as strong in Europe and the US as it is here'. The portrait of Kevin Kiely by Maeve McCarthy RHA gained the Ireland-US Council Portrait Award in 2006.

Besides book publication and work in many anthologies, his poetry has appeared in The Edinburgh Review, Poetry Ireland Review, Adrift (New York), Foolscap (London), Oasis (London), Acumen (UK), Other Poetry (UK), Cyphers, The Literary Review (New Jersey), Chapman (Scotland), Southword, Cork Literary Review, The Black Mountain Review, The Shop, Fortnight, Storm (Scotland), Touchstone (UK), Stony Thursday Book, Idaho Arts Quarterly, The Journal: Cumbria (UK), Decanto (UK), The Poetry Bus, The Sunday Independent, Revival Literary Journal, Red Poetry (Wales), Irish American Post, The Minetta Review (New York), Wild Violet Magazine, Pinched (London), Underground Press, (New York), SPRING: the journal of the ee cummings society, The Laughing Dog (US), ANU/A New Ulster 38, New Poetry International, Café Review (USA), Village: politics and culture, Pratik.

Kiely's plays, Multiple Indiscretions (1997) and Children of No Importance (2000), have been produced by RTÉ as well as "In This Supreme Hour" at the Derry Playhouse in 2016. He is also a successful novelist for young readers. A Horse Called El Dorado won the CBI Bisto Award in 2006. SOS Lusitania (2013) is a novel about war, politics and conspiracy theory and was the One Book One Community Choice in the Centenary Year of the Lusitania for 2015 during The Remember the Lusitania Project. His most recent adult fiction is The Welkinn Complex, which exposes psychiatric practice and the pharmaceutical industry, while UCD Belfield Metaphysical: a retrospective is a collection of poems published in 2017.

Kiely received Arts Council Literature Bursary Awards for his writings in 1980, 1989, 1990, 1998, 1999, 2004, A Bisto Award in 2005 and The Patrick Kavanagh Fellowship in Poetry 2006.

== Criticism ==
Kiely had begun reviewing poetry and literature, first with John Mulcahy's Hibernia, and later for various publications including The Examiner and Books Ireland. He became New Writing Editor and later Literary Editor (2000–2005) on Books Ireland at the invitation of its founder, Jeremy Cecil Addis, in 1995. He writes extensive and controversial criticism in Hibernia, Irish Examiner, Irish Independent, The Democrat Arts Page, Irish Studies Review, Honest Ulsterman, Fortnight, Books Ireland, The London Magazine, The Irish Book Review, Poetry Ireland Review, Irish Times, Irish Arts Review, Irish Literary Review, Inis, Idaho Arts Quarterly, Humanities (DC), The Journal of the E. E. Cummings Society, The Wallace Stevens Journal, The Robert Frost Review, MAKE IT NEW, Village: politics and culture.

Kiely's poetry criticism is not just confined to homegrown Irish publishing which he has extensively commented on in many reviews and surveys. He questioned the pervasively state-funded poetry scene amidst the arts in general "amidst cliques and cabals", and made public the lack of accountability of many arts institutions. He launched vociferous and persistent criticism of institutions such as Aosdána, which he feels are anathema to the identity and autonomy of the serious artist. His statements about the Arts Council's Aosdána reflect the wider concern along with other artists such as Robert Ballagh in relation to public funding channels devoid of accountability.

His literary criticism reached national news when he reviewed President Michael D. Higgins' Selected Poems in 2012 calling his poems "crimes against literature". Paul Durcan, quoted by The Irish Central, defended Michael D. Higgins, who, in his view, "has an absolute commitment to the spirit of poetry". Kiely responded through the Sunday Independent "In supporting the poetry of President Higgins, the Aosdana group prove that their own critical faculty and writing is of the same standard". Kiely's recent works in criticism, Harvard's Patron Jack of all Poets, about the Woodberry Poetry Room, and critical exegesis Seamus Heaney and the Great Poetry Hoax, prompted the American poet Carlo Parcelli to comment 'Kiely has unmasked a fraud that as he predicted years ago has burgeoned into an institutional conspiracy to honour the mediocre and the sham.'

The publication of Arts Council Immortals albeit the unofficial biography of the Arts Council 1951-2020 was praised by independent underground arts practitioners, writers and poets but has also involved legal action behind the scenes and unease among establishment commentators including John Burns who found it 'makes Finnegans Wake look like a Ladybird book'

== Epic poetry ==
In 2011, Kiely began cross-community workshops and talks in Northern Ireland, sporadically based in Derry with the Eden Place Arts Centre and with Pauline Ross's Playhouse Theatre which resulted in various writers' groups anthologies. Ten years contact with Ireland's conflicted peace process region, resulted in the two volumes of Yrland Regained: Central Cantos 'structured' within American modernist poetry techniques which evokes the Six Counties Sectarian War (1966-1998) and Ireland's centuries struggle towards full independence and unity. In 2021 he was invited as editorial adviser/proofreader on Pamela Mary Brown's Questions of Legacy and progressed to their co-writing poetry for the short film O City, City a heritage commission by the Derry City and Strabane District Council.

== Dr Meyer's Intelligent Design and Dr Kiely's The Principles of Poetry DI + ID = Ψ Psi ==
Kiely adopts an artistic, philosophical, scientific approach exploring the modern 'church of science' inclusive of Einstein, Bohr, Heisenberg, Schrödinger and Oppenheimer, and its infamous precursors in Copernicus, Kepler, Galileo, Newton and Descartes who 'accepted' the tenets of mysticism within hermeticism, sourcing the beginning of the Cosmos from astronomy, alchemy, geometry, chemistry, language and music. Kabbalists identify 'Ain Soph' as limitless Creator of languages: manifest in Reality, Nature and Poetry.

Dr Stephen Meyer's, Intelligent Design, the 'evidence-based scientific theory' from the Discovery Institute, Seattle debunks Darwin's On the Origin of Species as the dogma of 'new atheists' Richard Dawkins, Daniel Dennet, Christopher Hitchens and Lawrence Krauss. Meyer's scientific works The Signature in the Cell, Darwin's Doubt alongside Return of the G-d Hypothesis are tenuously compared by Kiely with Dante's Inferno, Purgatorio and Paradiso in terms of Meyer's 'journey' towards DI + ID = Ψ Psi. The Principles of Poetry DI + ID = Ψ Psi explores a vast array of poets, lines, quotations, and excerpts as linguistic DNA, 'placed' under the nano-microscope and critically analysed showing connections or not with DI + ID = Ψ Psi. Poets who convey mystical content through their poems, potentially enable mystical experience within the reader's perceptions.

== Notables at the Shakespeare Authorship Coalition ==
Dr Kiely is on the List of Notable Signatories of The Shakespeare Authorship Coalition with co-founders Derek Jacobi and Mark Rylance of the reasonable doubt about the identity of William Shakespeare The impetus for Kiely's Stratford-upon-Shakespeare and other Lies is the vilification by academies of Elizabeth Winkler's bestselling Shakespeare Was a Woman and Other Heresies.

Kiely traces the Elizabethan Authoritarian State enforcements represented in works attributed to Shakespeare and discusses the recent 'Authorship Question' which casts the bard as 'Anonymous'. Shakespeare as Public Lie was suppressed long before publication in the nineteen twenties of Shakespeare Identified. Seventeenth and eighteenth century biographers such as Aubrey followed by Rowe largely invented a series of forger-founders of the mythical-lie, still dictated by some fraudulent academics in the twenty-first century. Stratford-upon-Shakespeare and other Lies references major literary figures who recognised the Shakespeare Hoax, including Ros Barbar, Benjamin Disraeli, Majorie Garber, Henry James, Bernard Shaw and Mark Twain. The 'greatest playwright-poet in the world' syndrome is exposed as psychopathology of Thames-side imperial power-mongering exposed by modern historians including Tariq Ali, and in Caroline Elkins's Legacy of Violence: a history of the British Empire.

== The Living Skeleton: Irish Famine Poems ==
Village, Ireland's political and cultural magazine in February–March 2026 showcased The Living Skeleton: Irish Famine Poems (Spa Cottage Publishing, 2025) where Pamela Mary Brown resurrects 79 Famine-era poets whose poems record starvation, eviction and survival with a clarity that Government Papers never dared. Brown had invited Dr Kevin Kiely to write the encompassing Introduction. Donegal born Brown whose professional background as Creative-Writing Educator and Writer in-Residence at HMP Magilligan shapes her editorial method where witness-testimony within the anthology, evokes the horrors of tragedy, survival and exile, foregrounding the poets who wrote in real time during 'An Gorta Mór'.

== Kevin Kiely and Paul Durcan: clash of the poets ==
In Village (Magazine) Kiely's assessment and critique found reaction with the commentary that 'Durcan was no radical, nor did he ever supply much commentary on society unless it echoed the chuckle-verse of Rita Ann Higgins: a better artist, more socially conscious political content. Both poets wannabe stand-up comics. The performance-poetry circuit has little patience for mere comic verse: it expects high-grade confessional, political bite, and sharpened satire — at the outer edge, even the brinkmanship of battle rap.' The critical acumen and incisive prose demonstrated how Durcan 'can be faulted on basics, such as line flow, transition, and technique.' 'Hardcore classical surrealism traded in real poetry and claimed merely to use literature for revolt and action. Ranking with them are most of the American Beats. Durcan is minor.' Ireland's leading satirical review The Phoenix in "Affairs of the Nation" October 30, 2025 weighed in on the controversy noting on its front page 'Kevin Kiely v Paul Durcan' and elaborated the literary framing of Kiely 'as controversial biographer, critic and poet' whom Durcan claimed was 'the bolshy' and recounted how Dr Kiely 'had a track record for attacking establishment figures' including Seamus Heaney in 'The Great Poetry Hoax', the Arts Council 'and its "Khmer Rouge Kulchur Cult"' namely 'the self-appointed club of artists known as Aosdána, where Durcan was one of the high priests.'

== Critical Introductions ==
Kiely was commissioned to write critical introductions in the 2020s for Spa Cottage Publishing (Ireland) which includes classical titles: The Candle of Vision by AE (George William Russell); Thomas Moore: Political Poems; The Irish Percy French; The Selected Poems of Jane Elgee-Wilde; John Boyle O'Reilly: Definitive Selected Poems and Emily Lawless: Selected Poems.

== Published works ==
- Pieta, The Anthology (short fiction) ed. Leland Bardwell Co-Op Books Dublin 1982
- Quintesse, St Martin's Press, New York 1985. Gavin Witt, English Major, Yale University wrote a study of Quintesse, 1988
- Mere Mortals, Poolbeg, Dublin 1989 (Short-List Hughes & Hughes Fiction Prize 1990)
- Multiple Indiscretions, RTÉ 1997
- Children of No Importance, RTÉ 2000
- Plainchant for a Sundering (long-poem) Lapwing, Belfast 2001
- A Horse Called El Dorado, O'Brien Press, Dublin 2005 (Bisto Honour Award, 2006)
- Breakfast with Sylvia, Lagan Press, Belfast 2005/US Edition 2007; Awarded the Patrick Kavanagh Fellowship in Poetry 2006
- Francis Stuart: Artist and Outcast, Liffey Press, Dublin 2007, Areopagitica Publishing 2017 (Authorised Biography)
- Something Sensational To Read in the Train (anthology foreword: Brendan Kennelly) Lemon Soap Press, Dublin 2005
- Catullus: One Man of Verona Anthology, ed. Ronan Sheehan Farmar & Farmar Ltd 2010
- The Welkinn Complex Number One Son Publishing Co., Florida USA 2011; Areopagitica Publishing (Revised Edition) 2016
- Ends & Beginnings: Anthology eds. John Gery and William Pratt AMS Press Inc, New York 2011 Windows Anthology eds. Heather Brett and Noel Monahan 2012
- In Place of Love and Country eds. Richard Parker & John Gery Crater Press, London 2013
- SOS Lusitania, O'Brien Press, Dublin 2013
- The Taking of Christ (co-authored with Pamela Mary Brown) 2013
- 1916-2016 An Anthology of Reactions eds. John Liddy & Dominic Taylor The Limerick Writers' Centre, 2016
- UCD Belfield Metaphysical: a retrospective , Lapwing Press, Belfast 2017
- The Office on Serious Street, Writers Room Anthology, Eden Place Arts Centre, Derry 2017
- Seamus Heaney and the Great Poetry Hoax Areopagitica, 2018
- Harvard's Patron: Jack of All Poets Areopagitica, 2018
- UCD Belfield Metaphysical: New & Selected Poems Areopagitica, 2018
- Dracula and Luna (co-authored with Pamela Mary Brown) Areopagitica 2018
- Cromwell Milton Collins Carson from "Yrland Regained: Central Cantos" Cyberwit, Allahabad, India 2020
- Endgames: Good Friday Agreement & Missus Windsor's Hitmen Cantos Cyberwit, Allahabad, India 2020
- Arts Council Immortals Areopagitica 2020
- I shot the President's verse: Selected Journalism Areopagitica 2021
- Yrland Regained: Central Cantos I & II Areopagitica 2022
- Hotel Baudelaire: reservations and cancellations Areopagitica 2022
- The Candle of Vision A.E. (George William Russell) Introduction by Kevin Kiely Spa Cottage Publishing, 2022
- The Irish Percy French Introduction by Kevin Kiely Spa Cottage Publishing, 2022
- Secret Lives: Selected Poems and Prose of Susan Langstaff Mitchell Introduction by Kevin Kiely Spa Cottage Publishing, 2022
- The Selected Poems of Jane Elgee-Wilde Introduction by Kevin Kiely Spa Cottage Publishing, 2022
- Thomas Moore: Political Poems Introduction by Kevin Kiely Spa Cottage Publishing, 2024
- The Principles of Poetry DI + ID = Ψ Psi Spa Cottage Publishing, 2024
- Stratford-upon-Shakespeare and other Lies Spa Cottage Publishing, 2024
- The Mid-Century Frieze: A Literary History Spa Cottage Publishing, 2025
- The Living Skeleton: Irish Famine Poems (Edited by Pamela Mary Brown) Introduction by Kevin Kiely Spa Cottage Publishing, 2025
- Poet-Critic of Faust and Parzifal: the Diary-Ography (Introduction by Pamela Mary Brown) Amazon Books, 2026
