= Intervida =

Intervida is a non-partisan, non-denominational and independent Spanish development NGO. The organization is based in Barcelona.

== Mission ==
Intervida works to contribute towards sustainable human development, providing the resources necessary so that the most disadvantaged populations can strengthen their capacities and create opportunities to improve their living conditions.

== Action ==
Intervida's efforts consist of long-term projects, awareness-raising activities and education for development in order to improve the living conditions of the most disadvantaged communities in a sustainable way.

Currently, Intervida is active in several countries in Latin America, Asia and Africa, offering its support to nearly five million people.
