= Jean-Claude Awono =

- Born: May 31, 1969; Sa'a, Cameroon
- Occupations: Poet, literary critic, editor, publisher
- Writing career
- Language: French
- Genres: Poetry, literary criticism

Jean-Claude Awono is a Cameroonian poet, literary critic, editor, publisher, and educator. He is known for his numerous organisations of the ifrikiya events.

== Early life and education ==
Jean-Claude Awono was born on 31 May 1969 at Sa'a in Cameroun. He attended primary school in Ombessa before continuing his secondary education at CES Ombessa and Lycée de Bafia. After that, he pursued his studies in the university of Modern French Literature(LMF) in english language and civilisation in 1993. Then, he entered the Higher Teacher Training College of Yaoundé, from which he graduated as a teacher of language and literature, where he developed an early interest in literature, poetry, and cultural activities. In the mid-1990s, Jean-Claude Awono became part of a new wave of Cameroonian cultural figures working to reshape the country’s literary landscape. In 1996, he co-founded the association "La Ronde des poètes" in Yaoundé alongside several young writers, including Germain Djel and John Francis Shady Eoné, with the aim of promoting contemporary poetry and giving emerging authors a platform to express themselves. Under his leadership, the association organized literary cafés, poetry readings, and cultural activities in schools, while also launching the journal Le Rondin, dedicated to sharing and critically engaging with contemporary literary works. At the same time, he contributed to the cultural journal Patrimoine, joining its editorial board alongside a number of Cameroonian scholars and intellectuals.

== Career ==
Jean-Claude Awono became involved in independent publishing by creating La Ronde, a press focused on poetry collections and dramatic works. He also founded and directed ''Hiototi'', a Cameroonian literary journal devoted to poetry, literature, and cultural criticism.At a time when Cameroon’s book industry was facing economic challenges, he helped establish Ifrikiya Editions in 2007, bringing together the publishing houses Proximité, Interlignes, and La Ronde. The goal was to pool resources—human, technical, and financial—in order to strengthen local publishing. On February 24, 2012, he was appointed director of Ifrikiya Editions, taking over from François Nkémé. Under his leadership, the publishing house continued to promote contemporary African literature, support emerging writers, and expand the circulation of works from Cameroon and the wider African diaspora.

== Works ==
Within this association, several initiatives emerged under his guidance, including Hiototi, a Cameroonian journal dedicated to poetry, literature, and culture, the Cameroonian Observatory of Culture, the Francis Bebey Cultural Center, and the Seven Hills Poetry Festival of Yaoundé. A literary critic and columnist, he is currently the director of Ifrikiya Editions, established in 2007 through the merger of three small Cameroonian publishing houses.

He has taken part in poetry festivals across Africa, Europe, and China. In 2011, he was awarded the Bretagne-Réunie International Poetry Prize in France. His poems, many of which have appeared in international anthologies, have been translated into several languages, including Romanian, English, Breton, and others.

== Awards ==
In 2020, Awono received the Fernando D'Almeida International Poetry Prize, awarded to a Francophone African poet for contributions to poetry and literary mentorship in Africa.
