= Education Without Borders (Sudan) =

Voluntary Sudanese social movement

- تعليم بلا حدود
- Abbreviation: EWBSudan
- Formation: January 2011; 15 years ago
- Region served: Sudan
- Methods: Social movement
- Fields: Education
- Official language: Arabic
- Affiliations: NGO
- Website: Facebook page
- Formerly called: Teachers Without Borders

Education Without Borders in Sudan (EWBSudan) (Arabic: تعليم بلا حدود) is a voluntary Sudanese social movement established in January 2011 to improve school education in villages across Sudan.

== History ==
Established in January 2011 to improve school education in villages across Sudan, EWB ethoses is to activate the society and interact with it to grow and expand to the point of becoming as large as the society itself, then blend and dissolve completely resulting in a society that is concerned with education as an ongoing imperative issue. The group started with a number of university students and graduates. Its first activity was a campaign to collect used school books from families and private schools and redistribute them to the poorer students and schools. The campaign successfully distributed more than 5,000 books across Sudan. As of September 2022, the Facebook group had 29k members.

The group was originally called Teachers Without Borders (Arabic: معلمون بلا حدود). The name later changed to Education Without Borders after the authorities in Sudan refused to register it as a Non-governmental organization (NGO), claiming the proposed name requires members of the organization to be registered teachers. Despite the name change, the group remains unregistered with the Humanitarian Aid Commission of Sudan.

Education Without Borders has carried out several projects since its inauguration in 2011 including the My painting, My smile art exhibition (Arabic: بسمتي في رسمتي), which featured paintings by poorer school students from across the country depicting their ambitions, dreams, and hopes for the future. The exhibition also features professional photography by group members depicting the schools of the participating students. This creates an image of both the present situation and the future the organization hopes to create. Other project that the group is undertaking is the Translation project - where it hopes to translate various Wikipedia articles from English to Arabic in various topics (Medical Sciences, Engineering, Science, Economics and History). The end goal of the project is to increase the Arabic content on Wikipedia.

== Projects ==
- Academic adoption project.
- Textbook collection campaigns.
- School rehabilitation project "Hit & Run".
- Concepts project.
- Translation project.
- Reading day.
- School library project.
- "How to choose your academic specialty field" project.
- Education Without Borders magazine.
- Education Without Borders exhibitions (e.g., my painting is my smile for example, Arabic: بسمتي في رسمتي).

=== Academic adoption projects ===
Education Without Borders academic adoption vision is to provide a collection of academic programs for schools that has a shortage of teachers or a lack of cultural and/or health programs. EWB interacts with such schools and assigns a group of its volunteers as teachers to fill the gap, and another group to execute the programs associated with the academic support provided for the chosen school. During the last year, EWB has adopted Al Inkaz elementary school, which is located in Bahry, as well as Al Jeref reformatory in Khartoum.

EWB has fully adopted Al Jeref Reformatory. Academically, it provided teachers for the reformatory school. Socially, a rehabilitation program was started which aims to make the children get involved in various activities including painting, embroidery, theater, music, and singing. EWB has also arranged for many cultural lectures in various topics in coordination with several institutes. Also, a program for teaching children “teach five” has been initiated, where each volunteer adopt five children and commit to teaching them reading and writing. A library was provided to help in this project.

=== Textbooks collection campaigns ===
Your old book is my new book (Arabic: كتابك القديم هو كتابك الجديد) is an ongoing campaign which aims to collect, repair and redistribute the used school textbooks amongst the schools in villages and areas in need. This project was the kickoff for EWB. It started in 2011 with collecting 5,000 textbooks and reached more than 8,000 textbooks this year.

=== Schools rehabilitation project "Hit & Run" ===
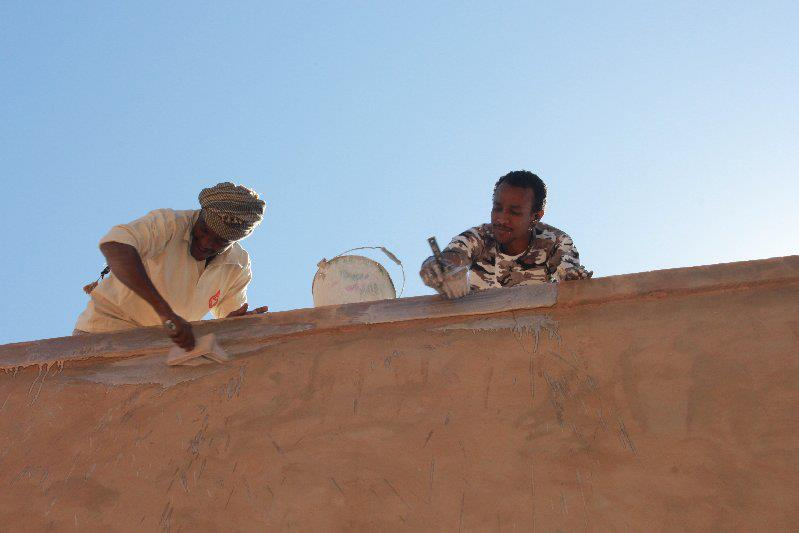
Refurbishment activities part of EWB hit & run project

"Hit & run" (Arabic: اضرب واهرب) has an objective to restore and rehabilitate old school buildings in coordination with the residents to create a more fitting environment for students. The project started mid-year (2011) in two schools: one in Al Kamlen and the other in Soba. Since then, almost 10 schools were rehabilitated (updated to 2012). EWB always adopted the Deaton-onin principle of aid by not providing direct but rather making the community aware of their problems and empower them to find and own the solution(s). A concept perpetuated by many Nobel laureates besides Angus Deaton.

However, the idea was stolen, distorted, and corrupted by 'Adil Almdaras (Arabic: عديل المدارس) focusing on media coverage, ready-made solutions, direct aid sometimes attributed to (corrupted) government officials, with less engagement with the targeted community.

=== Concepts project ===
Social concepts are a core part of EWB, since EWB's objectives exceed mere educational aspects. The project is a sub-group that is concerned with the main concepts in the society that need correction or changing. EWB tries using positive and acceptable methods to change and adjust wrong or improper concepts and beliefs that have spread amongst the society. Concept project follows the same vision of EWB — to dissolve in the society, resulting in a moderate modern society that follows a mature reasonable social demeanour.

=== Translation project ===
The translation project aims to boost the usage of the Arabic language on the Internet and to provide students and higher institutes with recent information on the other. It also aims to encourage scientific research as a parallel objective goes hand in hand with the process of academic education. The project plan is to:

- Translate 100 recent studies as a first stage. The studies will be related to medicine, engineering, and the economy.
- Choose the studies carefully to make sure they are recent—not more than two years old—and issued from a high-class institute of the university.
- Distribute the studies amongst a group of specialized doctors or professors to edit them.
- Provide the college libraries with copies of those studies (both Arabic and English) as well as republish them online for free.

Currently, various studies are being translated by a group of volunteers who are working on this project at the moment. EWB is now only translating from English to Arabic but the future plans include other languages as well.

=== Reading day ===
An annual event organized by EWB for the first time at 2013 on international author day, more than 5000 readers from Khartoum gathered at the green yard and start the biggest reading group in the history of Sudan.

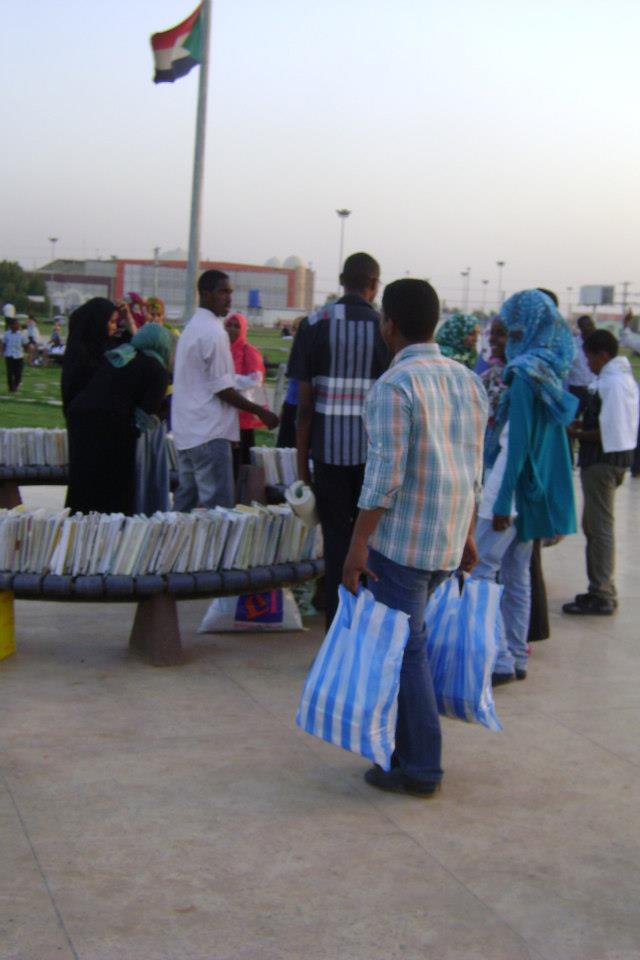
Book collection campaign at Green yard - Khartoum 2013

=== Library and reading club ===
EWB has also founded a library, where the books come from individuals as subscription fees. Every member has to pay three books and are allowed to borrow one book for one week. The goal of the project is to provide reading space at a low cost and with the contribution of society. There are two libraries one is hosted by Zol & Zola club and the other one is hosted by the University of Khartoum college of engineering. The library organizes cultural event monthly, and usually, it's discussion session in percent of some Sudanese writer like Stila Galiano and Mujahid Khalf Allah.

This project has reached the 40th book in 2016. Since starting in 2014, the club members have actively discussed and reviewed one book every three weeks. First, a copy of the book uploaded on the project page. Anyone interested can then read it and prepare their review to present it at the club event.

== See also ==
- Education Without Borders (Spanish organization)
- Education Without Borders (Canadian organization)
