= Richard Fester =

German historian (1860–1945)

- Born: 20 September 1860; Frankfurt am Main, German Confederation
- Died: 5 January 1945 (aged 84); Garmisch-Partenkirchen, Bavaria, Germany
- Occupations: Historian; Writer; University professor
- Spouse: Marie Ruckdeschel (1896)
- Children: 1
- Parent(s): Dr. jur. Anselm Fester; Johanna Fester/Engelhard

Richard Fester (20 September 1860 – 5 January 1945) was a German historian.

== Life ==
Richard Fester was born in Frankfurt where his father, Dr. Anselm Fester, worked as a lawyer-notary. Richard attended secondary school in the city until 1881 and then volunteered for a year of military service.

He undertook his university studies in History and Philology at the Ludwig-Maximilians-Universität München, the Friedrich Wilhelm University of Berlin, and the University of Strasbourg. It was at the University of Strasbourg that he passed his university final exams and also, on 6 March 1886, received his doctorate for work on the Imperial Military Constitution of the Holy Roman Empire at the end of the seventeenth century. His habilitation qualification followed, from the Ludwig-Maximilians-Universität München, on 18 November 1893. Between July 1888 and September 1892, he was also working as an assistant at the Regional Archives Office in Karlsruhe. From 1893, he was giving private tutorials at the Ludwig-Maximilians-Universität München. He moved to northern Bavaria (Franconia) in 1896, taking a post as a visiting professor in Medieval and Modern History at the University of Erlangen, which became a full professorship three years later on 16 October 1899.

On 1 April 1907, Fester switched to Kiel University, taking a position as Professor of Medieval and Modern History. Less than two years later, in October 1908, he moved again, this time to the University of Halle where he took an equivalent professorship, also becoming co-director for Historical Seminars. He remained at the University of Halle for 18 years, retiring from his position on 1 October 1926, by which time he had reached the age of 66.

During the First World War (1914-1918), Fester took a lead in fundraising, as a result of which he was awarded the Merit Cross for War Aid (Verdienstkreuz für Kriegshilfe). He also became, between 1917 and 1918, a member of the short-lived nationalist German Fatherland Party (Deutsche Vaterlandspartei / DVLP). In 1925, Fester drew widespread attention to himself in the context of the Munich "Stab in the back" trial by accusing the Social Democratic movement of treason.

Régime change early in 1933 triggered the launch in Germany of a twelve-year Nazi dictatorship. After 1935 Fester emerged from retirement to work at the antisemitic National Institute for the History of the New Germany ("Reichsinstitut für Geschichte des neuen Deutschlands"), serving on the institute's "Committee of Experts". Here he issued various antisemitic speeches and essays, such as one describing Judaism as a "Ferment of National Decomposition" (Ferment der nationalen Dekomposition, 1940) and as a "Destructive element of the Nation" (Zersetzungselement der Völker, 1941).

== Weeding ==
The Second World War ended a few months after Fester's death. From May 1945, a large part of what had been Germany was administered as the Soviet occupation zone, giving way in October 1949 to the German Democratic Republic a separate German state. Within this area the authorities compiled a list of literature to be weeded out. Several of Fester's published writings from the Nazi period were included on the list, including those identified above. In 1947, his work "Friedrich Wilhelm I., Friedrich der Große und die Anfänge deutscher Staatsgesinnung" covering Prussian expansion in the eighteenth century was added to the list, joined in 1953 by his analysis of international developments between 1914 and 1919.
