= Fezeka Secondary school =

Fezeka high School

Location
- Ny2, Fezeka Street; Gugulethu, Western Cape, Western Cape 7750; South Africa

Information
- Type: Public
- Motto: Fezeka, Be Perfect!!!
- Established: 1966
- School district: WCED: Metro Central Education District
- Principal: Mr Khume
- Grades: 8–12
- Enrollment: 1,020 (2015–2017)
- Colors: Blue, White and Grey
- Athletics: Soccer, decathlon
- Nickname: Fez
- Test average: NSC 69.0% (2017)

Fezeka High School is a public high school located in Gugulethu, Western Cape, South Africa. It is one of the high schools in the City of Cape Town Metropolitan Municipality.

== History ==
The school was founded in 1966, during the Apartheid era after black South Africans were not permitted to live in the city and were removed from areas such as District Six to Gugulethu, Nyanga and Langa. It was the second high school in the black township with Langa High School being first and I.D Mkize and Mabuwa (later renamed Sizamile High School and now known as Oscar Mpeta).

In August 1976, the school was part of the Soweto Uprising which was a protest led by black students across South Africa against the Bantu Education Act, which forced all black schools to use Afrikaans and English as languages of instruction.

In the 1990s the school was moved to a new location when the old high school was re-purposed as a municipal offices (also known now as iFezeka endala).

The students of Fezeka come from Western Cape and its suburbs, including Guguletu, Langa, Nyanga and Khayelitsha.

== Choir ==
Since 1999, under the direction of Monde Mdingi (conductor since 2014), Fezeka's school choir team has won over 35 national championship titles.

== Academics ==
In 2012, Fezeka achieved 75.2% in the National Senior Certificate test in the province of Western Cape.

== Notable alumni ==
- Ludwe Nkomo - Pan African Youth Union / Commission & Ilitha Labantu - Community Development Official
- Mcebisi Skwatsha – ANC NEC member
