= Gertrude Fester =

South African women's activist (born 1952)

Personal details
- Born: 4 July 1952 (age 74) Cape Town, South Africa
- Education: University of Cape Town; London School of Economics

Gertrude Fester (born 4 July 1952) is a South African feminist, women's activist and a member of the South African parliament in 1994. She was the Commissioner of the Gender Commission. She was a student of Harold Cressy High School in Cape Town and later in University of Cape Town. She completed her Doctorate from the London School of Economics in 2008 with a thesis entitled Women and citizenship struggles: A case of the Western Cape, South Africa 1980-2004.
