= Leicestershire County Council elections =

Local government elections in Leicestershire, England

Leicestershire County Council elections are held every four years. Leicestershire County Council is the upper-tier authority for the non-metropolitan county of Leicestershire in England. Since the last boundary changes in 2017, 55 county councillors have been elected from 53 electoral divisions.

== Council elections ==
Year	Conservative	Labour	Liberal Democrats (Note: Liberal Party, 1973–1981; SDP–Liberal Alliance, 1985.)	Reform	Green	UKIP	BNP	Independent	Council control after election
1973	42	36	7	–	–	–	–	8	No overall control
1977	75	17	0	–	–	–	–	1	Conservative
1981	44	43	5	–	–	–	–	1	No overall control
1985 (Note: Boundary changes reduced the number of seats by eleven.)	42	32	11	–	–	–	0	0	No overall control
1989	39	33	12	–	–	–	0	1	No overall control
1993	31	37	17	–	–	–	0	0	No overall control
1997 (Note: The number of seats decreased by 31 due to the removal of Leicester and Rutland.)	25	17	11	–	–	–	–	1	No overall control
2001	29	15	10	–	–	–	–	0	Conservative
2005 (Note: Boundary changes increased the number of seats by one.)	30	12	13	–	–	–	0	0	Conservative
2009	36	4	14	–	–	–	1	0	Conservative
2013	30	10	13	–	–	2	0	0	Conservative
2017 (Note: Boundary changes took place but the number of seats remained the same.)	36	6	13	–	–	0	–	0	Conservative
2021	42	4	9	–	–	–	–	0	Conservative
2025	15	2	11	25	1	–	–	1	No overall control

=== County result maps ===
2005

2009

2013

2017

2021

2025

== Changes between elections ==
=== 1993-1997 ===
North Braunstone By-Election 5 December 1996
Party	Candidate	Votes	%	±%
Liberal Democrats		399	33.1	
Labour		367	30.4	
Conservative		189	15.7	
Militant Labour		150	12.4	
Socialist Labour		101	8.4	
Majority		32	2.7	
Turnout		1,206	21	
Liberal Democrats gain from Labour		Swing		

=== 1997-2001 ===
Rothley By-Election 9 September 1999
Party	Candidate	Votes	%	±%
Conservative	Peter Osborne	1,064	72.0	+21.5
Liberal Democrats	Helena Edwards	414	28.0	+0.5
Majority		650	44.0	
Turnout		1,478	21.8	
Conservative hold		Swing		

Loughborough Shelthorpe By-Election 28 October 1999
Party	Candidate	Votes	%	±%
Labour	Marylin Cowles	751	52.3	+0.9
Conservative	Richard Allen	525	36.5	+2.5
Liberal Democrats	Paul Tyler	159	11.1	−3.4
Majority		226	15.8	
Turnout		1,435	19.2	
Labour hold		Swing		

=== 2005-2009 ===
Shepshed By-Election 4 October 2007
Party	Candidate	Votes	%	±%
Labour	Kevin Parler	1,217	30.2	−12.7
Conservative	Christine Radford	1,074	26.6	−10.2
Liberal Democrats	John Popley	933	23.1	+2.8
BNP	Julia Green	807	20.0	+20.0
Majority		143	3.6	
Turnout		4,031	37.3	
Labour hold		Swing		

=== 2009-2013 ===
Syston Ridgeway By-Election, 3 November 2011
Party	Candidate	Votes	%	±%
Conservative	Stephen John Hampson	981	52.13	−0.47
Labour	Colin Lovell	490	26.04	+6.64
BNP	Catherine Ann Mary Duffy	279	14.82	−4.58
Liberal Democrats	Richard John Miller	132	7.01	−10.39
Majority		491		
Turnout		1,882		
Conservative hold		Swing		

=== 2013-2017 ===
Narborough and Whetstone By-Election, 7 May 2015
Party	Candidate	Votes	%	±%
Conservative	Terence Richardson	4,011	56.0	−3.3
Labour	Michael Bounds	1,658	23.2	−7.1
UKIP	Carolyn Brennan	1,491	20.8	+20.8
Majority		2,353	32.9	
Turnout		7,160		
Conservative hold		Swing		

=== 2017-2021 ===
Stoney Stanton and Croft By-Election, 3 May 2018
Party	Candidate	Votes	%	±%
Conservative	Maggie Wright	1,566	49.0	−24.2
Liberal Democrats	Danny Findlay	1,032	32.3	+22.9
Labour	Christina Emmett	444	13.9	−3.5
Green	Nick Cox	153	4.8	+4.8
Majority		534	16.7	
Turnout		3,195		
Conservative hold		Swing		

Syston Ridgeway By-Election, 28 June 2018
Party	Candidate	Votes	%	±%
Conservative	Tom Barkley	810	59.7	+2.0
Labour	Claire Poole	251	18.5	−2.3
Liberal Democrats	Nitesh Dave	149	11.0	+5.0
Green	Matthew Wise	97	7.2	−1.2
UKIP	Andy McWilliam	49	3.6	−3.5
Majority		559	41.2	
Turnout		1,356		
Conservative hold		Swing		

Cosby and Countesthorpe By-Election, 12 December 2019
Party	Candidate	Votes	%	±%
Conservative	Les Phillimore	4,535	60.4	−3.5
Labour	Sandra Parkinson	1,290	17.2	−4.4
Liberal Democrats	Royston Bayliss	1,139	15.2	+7.5
Green	Christiane Startin-Lorent	543	7.2	+7.2
Majority		3,245	43.2	
Turnout		7,507		
Conservative hold		Swing		

=== 2021-2025 ===
Blaby and Glen Parva By-Election, 21 December 2023
Party	Candidate	Votes	%	±%
Liberal Democrats	Sue Jordan	989	61.2	+12.4
Conservative	Nigel Grundy	320	19.8	−13.7
Labour	Laura Badland	190	11.8	+1.8
Green	Mike Jelfs	116	7.2	−0.5
Majority		669	41.4	
Turnout		1,615		
Liberal Democrats hold		Swing		

Burbage By-Election, 2 May 2024
Party	Candidate	Votes	%	±%
Liberal Democrats	Barry Walker	1,496	51.3	+9.6
Conservative	Maddie Lee	880	30.2	−18.2
Labour	Jamie Ross	401	13.8	+4.6
Green	Rhiannon Carter	138	4.7	+4.7
Majority		616	21.1	
Turnout		2,915		
Liberal Democrats gain from Conservative		Swing		

=== 2025-2029 ===
Narborough and Whetstone By-Election, 16 April 2026
Party	Candidate	Votes	%	±%
Reform	Dee North	1,033	33.0	−9.3
Conservative	Les Phillimore	927	29.6	+5.1
Green	Mike Jelfs	884	28.2	+13.4
Liberal Democrats	Ande Savage	134	4.3	−3.6
Labour	Lisa Pendery-Hunt	124	4.0	−4.8
Advance UK	Martin Garfoot	28	0.9	+0.9
Majority		106	3.4	
Turnout		3,130		
Reform hold		Swing		

Shepshed By-Election, 15 October 2026
Party	Candidate	Votes	%	±%
Labour	Jane Lennie	1,163	32.8	+14.9
Reform	Stuart Wood	1,110	31.3	−13.6
Conservative	Sarah Monk	819	23.1	−2.3
Restore	Alec McKenzie	228	6.4	+6.4
Liberal Democrats	Katy Brookes-Duncan	115	3.2	−3.5
Green	David Kellock	112	3.2	−1.9
Majority		53	1.5	
Turnout		3,547		
Labour gain from Reform		Swing		

== Sources ==
- By-election results
