= 2025 Leicestershire County Council election =

2025 English local election

- 1 May 2025

All 55 seats to Leicestershire County Council 28 seats needed for a majority

	First party	Second party	Third party
Leader	none	Nick Rushton (defeated)	Michael Mullaney
Party	Reform	Conservative	Liberal Democrats
Last election	0 seats, 0.4%	42 seats, 51.8%	9 seats, 18.9%
Seats won	25	15	11
Seat change	▲25	▼27	▲2
Popular vote	61,314	53,743	30,778
Percentage	32.4%	28.4%	16.3%
Swing	▲32.0 pp	▼23.4 pp	▼2.6 pp
	Fourth party	Fifth party	Sixth party
Leader	Max Hunt (defeated)
Party	Labour	Green	Independent
Last election	4 seats, 20.3%	0 seats, 8.3%	0 seats, 0.9%
Seats won	2	1	1
Seat change	▼2	▲1	▲1
Popular vote	22,139	17,319	3,557
Percentage	11.7%	9.2%	1.9%
Swing	▼8.6 pp	▲0.9 pp	▲1.0 pp
- Winner of each seat at the 2025 Leicestershire County Council election
Leader before election
Nick Rushton
Conservative
Leader after election
Dan Harrison
Reform UK
No overall control

The 2025 Leicestershire County Council election took place on 1 May 2025 to elect members to Leicestershire County Council in Leicestershire, England. All 55 seats were up for election. This was on the same day as other local elections. Prior to the election the council was under Conservative majority control. The election saw the council go under no overall control, with Reform UK the largest party, winning 25 of the 55 seats, leaving them three seats short of a majority. They subsequently formed a minority administration to run the council.

== Background ==
Prior to the election, the council was under Conservative majority control. The leader of the council was Nick Rushton, although he had temporarily stood back from active leadership in July 2024 whilst undergoing medical treatment, and the deputy leader, Deborah Taylor, was serving as acting leader immediately prior to the election.

In the 2021 election, the Conservatives won 42 seats, giving them a majority and control of the council. The Liberal Democrats were the second biggest party with 9 seats, followed by Labour with 4 seats.

Two by-elections took place between the 2021 and 2025 elections:

Liberal Democrat Conservative

By-elections
Division	Date	Incumbent	Winner	Cause	Ref.
Blaby and Glen Parva	21 December 2023	Geoff Welsh	Sue Jordan	Retirement	
Burbage	2 May 2024	Amanda Wright	Barry Walker	Resignation	

In the 2024 general election, the Conservative Party retained four of their Leicestershire seats (Harborough, Oadby and Wigston, Hinckley and Bosworth, Rutland and Stamford, and South Leicestershire), and won the newly created seats of Mid Leicestershire and Melton and Syston. The Conservative Party also gained Leicester East from the Labour Party. Labour retained Leicester West, and won Loughborough and North West Leicestershire from the Conservatives, though they lost Leicester South to independent Shockat Adam. After the general election, Councillor Amanda Hack of Braunstone became MP for North West Leicestershire. In February 2025, Councillor Dan Harrison of Ibstock and Appleby left the Conservative Party and joined Reform UK, citing frustration with changes in leadership and the way the County Council was run.

== Previous council composition ==
After 2021 election		Before 2025 election	
Party	Seats	Party	Seats
Conservative	42	Conservative	40
Liberal Democrats	9	Liberal Democrats	10
Labour	4	Labour	4
Independent	0	Independent	1

=== Changes 2021–2025 ===
- November 2023: Geoff Welsh (Liberal Democrats) resigns – by-election held December 2023
- December 2023: Sue Jordan (Liberal Democrats) wins by-election
- March 2024: Amanda Wright (Conservative) resigns – by-election held May 2024
- May 2024: Barry Walker (Liberal Democrats) gains by-election from Conservatives
- February 2025: Dan Harrison (Conservatives) leaves party and subsequently joined Reform UK.

== Summary ==
=== Overview ===
At the election, the Conservatives suffered an electoral collapse in line with their poor national performance, dropping from 42 seats to 15, and losing their majority on the council for the first time since 1997. Overall, the Conservatives lost 45% of their vote from the 2021 election. Nick Rushton, the Conservative leader of the council, lost his seat to Reform UK candidate Michael Squires.

Reform UK was the main beneficiary of the Conservative collapse, winning the popular vote, and gaining 25 seats across the county to emerge as the largest party on the council - although three seats short of an overall majority. Reform UK chose Dan Harrison to be their group leader after the election. He had been a Conservative councillor until he left the Conservatives to join Reform UK in February 2025. He was formally appointed as the new leader of the council at the subsequent annual council meeting on 14 May 2025. Reform UK formed a minority administration, taking all the seats on the council's cabinet. The Conservatives chose Deborah Taylor, who had been acting leader prior to the election, to be their new group leader in opposition.

Despite losses in overall vote share, and losing several seats to Reform UK, the Liberal Democrats increased their seat count to 11. Labour lost 2 seats, finishing the night with 2, and saw a significant decline in their vote share. The Greens won a seat on the council for the first time in their history, and a single independent - former Liberal Democrat councillor Michael Charlesworth - was elected in the East Wigston division.

=== Election result ===
2025 Leicestershire County Council election
Party	Candidates	Seats	Gains	Losses	Net gain/loss	Seats %	Votes %	Votes	+/−
Reform	55	25	25	0	▲25	45.5	32.4	61,314	+32.0
Conservative	55	15	0	27	▼27	27.3	28.4	53,743	–23.4
Liberal Democrats	54	11	5	3	▲2	20.0	16.3	30,778	–2.6
Labour	55	2	1	3	▼2	3.6	11.7	22,139	–8.6
Green	55	1	1	0	▲1	1.8	9.2	17,319	+0.9
Independent	15	1	1	0	▲1	1.8	1.9	3,557	+1.0
Animal Welfare	1	0	0	0	Steady	0.0	<0.1	76	N/A
Alliance for Democracy and Freedom (UK)	2	0	0	0	Steady	0.0	<0.1	48	N/A
Communist	1	0	0	0	Steady	0.0	<0.1	31	N/A

== Division results by district ==
=== Blaby ===
Blaby district summary
Party	Seats	+/-	Votes	%	+/-
Reform UK	6	▲6	10,409	35.8	N/A
Conservative	1	▼5	8,314	28.6	–27.5
Liberal Democrats	1	Steady	3,885	13.4	–0.4
Green	0	Steady	3,555	12.2	+0.8
Labour	0	▼1	2,860	9.8	–8.3
Independent	0	Steady	56	0.2	–0.5
Total	8	Steady	29,079	30.2	
Registered electors			78,961	–	

Division results

Blaby & Glen Parva
Party	Candidate	Votes	%	±%
Reform	John Bloxham	1,366	44.1	N/A
Liberal Democrats	Sue Jordan*	1,110	35.8	–12.9
Conservative	Marian Broomhead	321	10.4	–23.1
Green	Eleanor Turner	153	4.9	–2.8
Labour	Anna Parrish	147	4.7	–5.3
Majority		256	8.3	N/A
Turnout		3,097	32.2	
Registered electors		9,622		
Reform gain from Liberal Democrats				

Braunstone
Party	Candidate	Votes	%	±%
Reform	Kim Robinson	965	35.4	N/A
Conservative	Iain Hewson	843	31.0	–9.1
Labour	Tracey Shepherd	621	22.8	–21.9
Green	Mary Kapadia	160	5.9	–0.2
Liberal Democrats	Antony Moseley	134	4.9	+2.3
Majority		122	4.4	N/A
Turnout		2,723	28.4	
Registered electors		9,604		
Reform gain from Labour				

Cosby & Countesthorpe
Party	Candidate	Votes	%	±%
Reform	Graham Cooke	1,333	38.1	N/A
Conservative	Les Phillimore*	1,039	29.7	–28.7
Liberal Democrats	Royston Bayliss	718	20.5	+5.5
Labour	Callum Parrish	218	6.2	–7.3
Green	Guy Walsh	194	5.5	–7.4
Majority		294	8.4	N/A
Turnout		3,502	33.6	
Registered electors		10,421		
Reform gain from Conservative				

Enderby & Lubbesthorpe
Party	Candidate	Votes	%	±%
Liberal Democrats	Nick Holt	802	31.4	+25.8
Reform	Moin Siddiqui	668	26.2	N/A
Conservative	David Findlay	564	22.1	–33.2
Labour	Ravinder Kaur	400	15.7	–13.6
Green	Florence Turner	119	4.7	–5.1
Majority		134	5.2	N/A
Turnout		2,553	26.7	
Registered electors		9,561		
Liberal Democrats gain from Conservative				

Glenfields, Kirby Muxloe & Leicester Forests (2 seats)
Party	Candidate	Votes	%	±%
Conservative	Nick Chapman*	1,953	37.2	–26.8
Reform	Kevin Crook	1,733	33.0	N/A
Conservative	Lee Breckon*	1,705	32.4	–31.3
Reform	Josh Walden	1,589	30.2	N/A
Green	Tony Deakin	1,165	22.2	+5.7
Green	Nick Cox	1,086	20.7	+7.3
Labour	Malcolm Fox	440	8.4	–17.6
Labour	Shabbir Aslam	410	7.8	N/A
Liberal Democrats	Iain Smith	266	5.1	–6.1
Liberal Democrats	Eddie Larkin	166	3.2	–3.2
Turnout		~5,257	28.5	
Registered electors		18,475		
Conservative hold				
Reform gain from Conservative				

Narborough & Whetstone
Party	Candidate	Votes	%	±%
Reform	Andrew Thorp	1,403	42.3	N/A
Conservative	Nigel Grundy	812	24.5	–36.7
Green	Mike Jelfs	492	14.8	+2.7
Labour	Lisa Pendery-Hunt	291	8.8	–12.2
Liberal Democrats	Ande Savage	261	7.9	+2.3
Independent	Danuta Jeeves	56	1.7	N/A
Majority		591	17.8	N/A
Turnout		3,315	31.0	
Registered electors		10,709		
Reform gain from Conservative				

Stoney Stanton & Croft
Party	Candidate	Votes	%	±%
Reform	Carl Abbott	1,352	40.0	N/A
Conservative	Ben Taylor	1,077	31.9	–31.2
Liberal Democrats	Matt Wright	428	12.7	–2.7
Labour	Laura Badland	333	9.9	–2.5
Green	Xeimon Parker-Cox	186	5.5	–3.4
Majority		275	8.1	N/A
Turnout		3,376	31.9	
Registered electors		10,569		
Reform gain from Conservative				

=== Charnwood ===
Charnwood district summary
Party	Seats	+/-	Votes	%	+/-
Conservative	6	▼5	13,330	30.4	–21.4
Reform UK	5	▲5	14,158	32.3	+31.5
Labour	2	▼1	8,441	19.3	–10.0
Green	1	▲1	5,792	13.2	+1.6
Liberal Democrats	0	Steady	2,115	4.8	–1.6
Total	14	Steady	43,836	32.6	
Registered electors			134,520	–	

Division results

Birstall
Party	Candidate	Votes	%	±%
Conservative	Daniel Grimley*	1,433	40.8	–8.4
Reform	Michael Kerchey	938	26.7	N/A
Labour Co-op	Julie Palmer	720	20.5	–14.8
Green	Paul Masters	254	7.2	N/A
Liberal Democrats	Kelvin Jordan	168	4.8	–10.5
Majority		495	14.1	+0.2
Turnout		3,513	32.2	
Registered electors		10,902		
Conservative hold				

Bradgate
Party	Candidate	Votes	%	±%
Conservative	Deborah Taylor*	1,898	48.7	–17.8
Reform	Reita Kerr	1,143	29.3	N/A
Labour Co-op	Rhys Cory-Lowsley	392	10.1	–6.7
Green	Sandra Woodward	306	7.9	–2.8
Liberal Democrats	Nigel Oxford	158	4.1	–1.8
Majority		755	19.4	–30.3
Turnout		3,897	37.3	
Registered electors		10,460		
Conservative hold				

Loughborough East
Party	Candidate	Votes	%	±%
Labour Co-op	Jewel Miah*	1,017	43.2	–15.1
Reform	Jonathan Clarson	600	25.5	+22.1
Conservative	Geoffrey Parsons	348	14.8	–10.0
Green	Daisy Taylor	289	12.3	+2.6
Liberal Democrats	Andrew Willig	98	4.2	+0.5
Majority		417	17.7	–15.8
Turnout		2,352	24.9	
Registered electors		9,461		
Labour Co-op hold		Swing	▼18.6	

Loughborough North West
Party	Candidate	Votes	%	±%
Reform	Andrew Hamilton-Gray	857	39.6	N/A
Labour Co-op	Max Hunt*	719	33.2	–17.7
Conservative	Tim Whitehead	357	16.5	–19.8
Green	Paul Goodman	155	7.2	+0.7
Liberal Democrats	Jim Murcott	76	3.5	–0.9
Majority		138	6.4	N/A
Turnout		2,164	30.6	
Registered electors		7,068		
Reform gain from Labour Co-op				

Loughborough North
Party	Candidate	Votes	%	±%
Reform	Peter Morris	1,040	39.0	N/A
Labour	Sarah Maynard	678	25.5	–18.6
Conservative	Sarah Monk	602	22.6	–20.9
Green	Sean Kerslake	196	7.4	–0.9
Liberal Democrats	Murray Sinclair	148	5.6	+1.6
Majority		362	13.5	N/A
Turnout		2,664	30.8	
Registered electors		8,657		
Reform gain from Labour				

Loughborough South West
Party	Candidate	Votes	%	±%
Conservative	Richard Bailey	1,144	31.7	–13.7
Labour	Sara Goodwin	1,040	28.8	+4.6
Reform	Jim Foxall	849	23.5	+20.9
Green	John Barton	328	9.1	±0.0
Liberal Democrats	David Walker	253	7.0	–11.6
Majority		104	2.9	–18.3
Turnout		3,614	37.5	
Registered electors		9,640		
Conservative hold		Swing	▼9.2	

Loughborough South
Party	Candidate	Votes	%	±%
Labour	Beverley Gray	854	36.3	–3.2
Reform	Ed Foxall	681	29.0	N/A
Conservative	Harry Hughes-Slattery	431	18.3	–29.8
Green	Rachel Baker	248	10.5	+2.0
Liberal Democrats	Alex Gueffero	137	5.8	+2.0
Majority		173	7.3	N/A
Turnout		2,351	27.6	
Registered electors		8,516		
Labour gain from Conservative				

Quorn & Barrow
Party	Candidate	Votes	%	±%
Reform	Paul Rudkin	1,316	34.0	+31.7
Conservative	Hilary Fryer*	1,143	29.5	–25.2
Labour	Phil Walden	815	21.1	–6.9
Green	Richard Horrocks	365	9.4	–1.0
Liberal Democrats	Carolyn Thornborow	230	5.9	+1.5
Majority		173	4.5	N/A
Turnout		3,869	35.9	
Registered electors		10,783		
Reform gain from Conservative		Swing	▲28.5	

Rothley & Mountsorrel
Party	Candidate	Votes	%	±%
Reform	Linda Danks	1,217	36.3	N/A
Conservative	Leon Hadji-Nikolaou*	878	26.2	–29.8
Labour Co-op	Liz Blackshaw	760	22.7	–10.5
Liberal Democrats	Alistair Duffy	272	8.1	+3.7
Green	David Isaac	223	6.7	+0.4
Majority		339	10.1	N/A
Turnout		3,350	32.0	
Registered electors		10,465		
Reform gain from Conservative				

Shepshed
Party	Candidate	Votes	%	±%
Reform	Helen Butler	1,859	44.9	N/A
Conservative	Christine Radford*	1,054	25.4	–34.6
Labour	Jane Lennie	742	17.9	–9.8
Liberal Democrats	Katy Brookes-Duncan	276	6.7	+1.5
Green	Kelly Swann	211	5.1	–1.9
Majority		805	19.5	N/A
Turnout		4,142	34.4	
Registered electors		12,051		
Reform gain from Conservative				

Sileby & The Wolds
Party	Candidate	Votes	%	±%
Green	Naomi Bottomley	1,335	39.4	+26.7
Reform	Roger Bacon	1,098	32.4	+30.4
Conservative	Jenny Bokor	652	19.2	–38.0
Labour Co-op	Kaisra Khan	199	5.9	–14.6
Liberal Democrats	Ian Sharpe	104	3.1	–3.1
Majority		237	7.0	N/A
Turnout		3,388	32.8	
Registered electors		10,338		
Green gain from Conservative		Swing	▼1.9	

Syston Fosse
Party	Candidate	Votes	%	±%
Conservative	James Poland*	1,297	40.6	–18.9
Reform	Kieran Taylor	915	28.7	N/A
Green	Laurie Needham	894	28.0	–4.0
Labour	Michael McLoughlin	86	2.7	–5.7
Majority		382	11.9	–15.6
Turnout		3,192	38.2	
Registered electors		8,361		
Conservative hold				

Syston Ridgeway
Party	Candidate	Votes	%	±%
Conservative	Simon Bradshaw	896	32.8	–14.6
Reform	Ian Hayes	831	30.4	N/A
Green	Rebekka Yates	825	30.2	–12.7
Labour	David Brentnall	120	4.4	–5.1
Liberal Democrats	Marianne Gilbert	59	2.2	N/A
Majority		65	2.4	–2.1
Turnout		2,731	31.7	
Registered electors		8,614		
Conservative hold				

Thurmaston Ridgemere
Party	Candidate	Votes	%	±%
Conservative	Brenda Seaton*	1,197	45.9	–19.1
Reform	Chris Gibson	814	31.2	N/A
Labour Co-op	Roger Smith	299	11.5	–16.0
Green	Wendy Hardy	163	6.2	N/A
Liberal Democrats	Nitesh Dave	136	5.2	–2.1
Majority		383	14.7	–22.8
Turnout		2,609	28.3	
Registered electors		9,204		
Conservative hold				

=== Harborough ===
Harborough district summary
Party	Seats	+/-	Votes	%	+/-
Conservative	3	▼3	8,650	31.7	–19.2
Reform UK	2	▲2	7,749	28.4	N/A
Liberal Democrats	2	▲1	5,971	21.9	–4.9
Green	0	Steady	2,624	9.6	+0.7
Labour	0	Steady	2,221	8.2	–5.2
Communist	0	Steady	31	0.1	N/A
Total	7	Steady	27,246	35.4	
Registered electors			76,916	–	

Division results

Broughton Astley
Party	Candidate	Votes	%	±%
Reform	Bill Piper	1,164	37.5	N/A
Conservative	Neil Bannister*	918	29.6	–23.2
Liberal Democrats	Mark Graves	684	22.1	–10.1
Labour Co-op	Sandra Parkinson	206	6.6	–1.3
Green	Dannielle Bonham	130	4.2	–2.8
Majority		246	7.9	N/A
Turnout		3,102	33.7	
Registered electors		9,199		
Reform gain from Conservative				

Bruntingthorpe
Party	Candidate	Votes	%	±%
Reform	Harrison Fowler	1,493	34.2	N/A
Conservative	Jonathan Bateman	1,359	31.1	–28.7
Liberal Democrats	Stephen Walkley	918	21.0	+3.0
Labour	Paul MacIntyre	301	6.9	–6.2
Green	Mandy Sanders	298	6.8	–2.2
Majority		134	3.1	N/A
Turnout		4,369	37.9	
Registered electors		11,537		
Reform gain from Conservative				

Gartree
Party	Candidate	Votes	%	±%
Conservative	Phil King*	1,832	47.5	–14.6
Reform	Jonny Austin	976	25.3	N/A
Green	Debbie James	475	12.3	+2.1
Liberal Democrats	James Lindsay	360	9.3	–4.8
Labour	Leigh Wiseman	213	5.5	–7.9
Majority		856	22.2	–25.8
Turnout		3,856	34.0	
Registered electors		11,341		
Conservative hold				

Launde
Party	Candidate	Votes	%	±%
Liberal Democrats	Simon Galton*	1,732	42.5	–2.6
Conservative	Jack Crankshaw	1,017	25.0	–15.8
Reform	Nigel Clarke	986	24.2	N/A
Labour	Colleen Cassidy	175	4.3	–4.6
Green	Melanie Wakley	162	4.0	–1.1
Majority		715	17.5	+13.2
Turnout		4,072	36.4	
Registered electors		11,182		
Liberal Democrats hold		Swing	▲6.6	

Lutterworth
Party	Candidate	Votes	%	±%
Conservative	Rosita Page*	1,317	36.3	–19.4
Reform	Martin Sarfas	1,250	34.4	N/A
Labour	Martin Cullen	642	17.7	–6.4
Green	Carl Tiivas	242	6.7	–0.9
Liberal Democrats	Asit Sodha	182	5.0	–7.5
Majority		67	1.9	–29.7
Turnout		3,633	35.4	
Registered electors		10,275		
Conservative hold				

Market Harborough East
Party	Candidate	Votes	%	±%
Liberal Democrats	Sarah Hill	1,335	32.2	–6.0
Conservative	Barry Champion*	1,199	28.9	–13.2
Reform	Barry Walton	956	23.0	N/A
Labour	Maria Panter	331	8.0	–3.3
Green	Mary Morgan	328	7.9	–0.4
Majority		136	3.3	N/A
Turnout		4,149	36.3	
Registered electors		11,426		
Liberal Democrats gain from Conservative		Swing	▲3.6	

Market Harborough West & Foxton
Party	Candidate	Votes	%	±%
Conservative	David Page	1,008	24.8	–20.7
Green	Darren Woodiwiss	989	24.3	+8.7
Reform	Nick Hatfield	924	22.7	N/A
Liberal Democrats	Jo Asher	760	18.7	–5.5
Labour	Mark Panter	353	8.7	–5.7
Communist	Peter Whalen	31	0.8	N/A
Majority		19	0.5	–20.8
Turnout		4,065	34.3	
Registered electors		11,856		
Conservative hold		Swing	▼14.7	

=== Hinckley & Bosworth ===
Hinckley & Bosworth district summary
Party	Seats	+/-	Votes	%	+/-
Liberal Democrats	5	▲2	8,948	31.5	–1.1
Reform UK	2	▲2	9,218	32.5	+32.0
Conservative	2	▼4	7,340	25.9	–25.4
Labour	0	Steady	1,512	5.3	–7.5
Green	0	Steady	1,183	4.2	+1.5
Independent	0	Steady	172	0.6	N/A
ADF	0	Steady	14	<0.1	N/A
Total	9	Steady	28,387		
Registered electors				–	

Division results

Burbage
Party	Candidate	Votes	%	±%
Liberal Democrats	Barry Walker*	1,266	38.5	–3.2
Reform	John Haynes	947	28.8	N/A
Conservative	Madaleine Lee	796	24.2	–24.1
Labour	James Ross	147	4.5	–4.7
Green	Rhiannon Carter	135	4.1	N/A
Majority		319	9.7	N/A
Turnout		3,291	32.7	
Registered electors		10,073		
Liberal Democrats gain from Conservative				

De Montfort
Party	Candidate	Votes	%	±%
Liberal Democrats	Michael Mullaney*	1,653	49.5	–6.2
Reform	Craig Harwood	900	26.9	N/A
Conservative	Robert Ashman	505	15.1	–22.0
Labour Co-op	James Davis	139	4.2	–3.0
Green	Sarah Nimmo	86	2.6	N/A
Independent	Andy Eggington	58	1.7	N/A
Majority		753	22.6	+4.0
Turnout		3,341	32.9	
Registered electors		10,167		
Liberal Democrats hold				

Earl Shilton
Party	Candidate	Votes	%	±%
Reform	Martin England	1,191	40.1	+36.8
Liberal Democrats	Patrick Weightman	846	28.5	+18.4
Conservative	Richard Allen*	607	20.4	–41.3
Labour	Paul Gurney	147	5.0	–14.3
Green	Cassie Wells	119	4.0	–1.4
Independent	Tom Smith	41	1.4	N/A
Independent	Dee Deighton	18	0.6	N/A
Majority		345	11.6	N/A
Turnout		2,969	27.4	
Registered electors		10,831		
Reform gain from Conservative		Swing	▲9.2	

Groby & Ratby
Party	Candidate	Votes	%	±%
Conservative	Ozzy O'Shea*	1,582	50.7	–24.7
Reform	Kev Pym	880	28.2	N/A
Liberal Democrats	Martin Cartwright	388	12.4	+3.6
Labour	Lee Perkins	135	4.3	–6.9
Green	Sarah Linnett	134	4.3	–0.2
Majority		702	22.5	–41.7
Turnout		3,119	32.8	
Registered electors		9,500		
Conservative hold				

Hollycroft
Party	Candidate	Votes	%	±%
Liberal Democrats	Ann Pendlebury	1,372	46.7	–10.4
Reform	Harry Masters	991	33.7	N/A
Conservative	Connor Harris	347	11.8	–20.7
Labour	Lesley Panton	125	4.3	–6.0
Green	Richard Ansell	69	2.3	N/A
Independent	Julie Randles	19	0.6	N/A
ADF	Noel Cook	14	0.5	N/A
Majority		381	13.0	–11.6
Turnout		2,937	27.9	
Registered electors		10,531		
Liberal Democrats hold				

Mallory
Party	Candidate	Votes	%	±%
Liberal Democrats	Mark Bools	1,179	37.1	–7.3
Reform	Joel Hollowell	1,063	33.4	N/A
Conservative	James Paterson	690	21.7	–24.7
Green	Jim Buck	124	3.9	N/A
Labour Co-op	Andre Wheeler	124	3.9	–5.2
Majority		116	3.7	N/A
Turnout		3,180	31.1	
Registered electors		10,238		
Liberal Democrats gain from Conservative				

Market Bosworth
Party	Candidate	Votes	%	±%
Conservative	Joshua Melen	1,357	37.8	–29.0
Reform	Tony Birch	1,255	35.0	N/A
Liberal Democrats	Bill Crooks	590	16.4	+2.7
Labour	Carole Sharma	202	5.6	–4.9
Green	Alec Duthie	183	5.1	–3.9
Majority		102	2.8	–50.3
Turnout		3,587	38.1	
Registered electors		9,425		
Conservative hold				

Markfield, Desford & Thornton
Party	Candidate	Votes	%	±%
Reform	Charles Whitford	1,244	35.8	+34.7
Conservative	Claire Stacey Harris	1,110	31.9	–22.1
Liberal Democrats	Joyce Crooks	541	15.6	–0.1
Labour	Geoffrey Robertson Dams	367	10.6	–13.9
Green	Matthew Lee Widdowson	216	6.2	+1.7
Majority		134	3.9	N/A
Turnout		3,478	33.2	
Registered electors		10,474		
Reform gain from Conservative		Swing	▲28.4	

St Marys
Party	Candidate	Votes	%	±%
Liberal Democrats	Stuart Bray*	1,113	44.8	–6.5
Reform	Andy Ellis	747	30.1	N/A
Conservative	Cal Antliff	346	13.9	–20.6
Labour Co-op	Eamonn Gabriel	126	5.1	–8.3
Green	Rebecca Linnett	117	4.7	N/A
Independent	Benn Moore	28	1.1	N/A
Independent	Steve Proctor	8	0.3	N/A
Majority		366	14.7	–2.1
Turnout		2,485	28.6	
Registered electors		8,691		
Liberal Democrats hold				

=== Melton ===
Melton district summary
Party	Seats	+/-	Votes	%	+/-
Conservative	2	▼2	4,419	33.7	–26.8
Reform UK	2	▲2	4,105	31.3	+30.8
Labour	0	Steady	1,542	11.7	–6.1
Independent	0	Steady	1,440	11.0	+3.7
Green	0	Steady	995	7.6	–0.2
Liberal Democrats	0	Steady	589	4.5	–1.5
ADF	0	Steady	34	0.3	N/A
Total	4	Steady	13,124	28.3	
Registered electors			42,798	–	

Division results

Belvoir
Party	Candidate	Votes	%	±%
Conservative	Bryan Lovegrove*	1,629	44.2	–23.5
Reform	Dennis Pengelly	1,040	28.2	N/A
Labour	Jim Mason	441	12.0	–2.3
Green	David Cannon	245	6.6	–4.4
Liberal Democrats	Richard Bartfield	225	6.1	–0.8
Independent	Sam Seaward	106	2.9	N/A
Majority		589	16.0	–37.4
Turnout		3,686	36.3	
Registered electors		10,168		
Conservative hold				

Melton East
Party	Candidate	Votes	%	±%
Reform	Andrew Innes	1,090	32.7	+30.6
Conservative	Pam Posnett*	989	29.6	–24.4
Labour	Helen Cliff	581	17.4	–6.2
Independent	Allen Thwaites	305	9.1	N/A
Green	Alastair McQuillan	263	7.9	+0.6
Liberal Democrats	Ian Ridley	108	3.2	+0.2
Majority		101	3.1	N/A
Turnout		2,336	20.8	
Registered electors		11,212		
Reform gain from Conservative		Swing	▲27.5	

Melton West
Party	Candidate	Votes	%	±%
Reform	Kerry Knight	1,017	37.8	N/A
Independent	Sharon Brown	563	20.9	N/A
Conservative	Roma Frisby	480	17.8	–35.5
Labour	Nick Flatt	269	10.0	–13.2
Green	Jack Walker	215	8.0	–6.8
Independent	Marilyn Gordon	84	3.1	–5.5
Liberal Democrats	Victor Kaufman	64	2.4	N/A
Majority		454	16.9	N/A
Turnout		2,692	24.1	
Registered electors		11,151		
Reform gain from Conservative				

Melton Wolds
Party	Candidate	Votes	%	±%
Conservative	Joe Orson*	1,321	38.7	–25.6
Reform	James Donovan	958	28.1	N/A
Independent	Steve Carter	382	11.2	–0.2
Green	Martyn Gower	272	8.0	N/A
Labour	Jim Clarke	251	7.4	–4.8
Liberal Democrats	Alan Rodenby	192	5.6	–6.3
ADF	Malcolm Smith	34	1.0	N/A
Majority		363	10.6	–41.5
Turnout		3,410	33.3	
Registered electors		10,267		
Conservative hold				

=== North West Leicestershire ===
North West Leicestershire district summary
Party	Seats	+/-	Votes	%	+/-
Reform UK	7	▲7	11,434	41.2	+40.5
Conservative	1	▼7	6,982	25.2	–25.3
Labour	0	Steady	4,153	15.0	–13.6
Liberal Democrats	0	Steady	2,354	8.5	–0.6
Green	0	Steady	1,935	7.0	–0.7
Independent	0	Steady	790	2.8	+0.8
Animal Welfare	0	Steady	76	0.3	N/A
Total	8	Steady	27,724	33.0	
Registered electors			83,943	–	

Division results

Ashby de la Zouch
Party	Candidate	Votes	%	±%
Reform	Dan Harrison	1,457	39.3	+38.1
Labour Co-op	Damilola Ojuri	864	23.3	–6.7
Conservative	Raymond Morris	665	17.9	–31.6
Liberal Democrats	Martin Cooper	416	11.2	+7.0
Green	Drew Timms	306	8.3	–4.5
Majority		593	16.0	N/A
Turnout		3,708	33.8	
Registered electors		10,956		
Reform gain from Conservative		Swing	▲22.4	

Castle Donington & Kegworth
Party	Candidate	Votes	%	±%
Reform	Charles Pugsley	1,146	35.1	N/A
Independent	Ray Sutton	691	21.2	N/A
Conservative	Ted Parton	606	18.6	–28.0
Labour	Alison Morley	348	10.7	–15.0
Liberal Democrats	Ian Bradley	279	8.5	+5.1
Green	Jessie Cooke	120	3.7	–3.3
Animal Welfare	Tarnia Anne Wilson	76	2.3	N/A
Majority		455	13.9	N/A
Turnout		3,266	32.1	
Registered electors		10,170		
Reform gain from Conservative				

Coalville North
Party	Candidate	Votes	%	±%
Conservative	Craig Smith*	1,280	41.3	–1.5
Reform	Elliott Allman	1,100	35.5	N/A
Labour Co-op	Rebecca Pawley	433	14.0	–19.7
Liberal Democrats	Amanda Briers	155	5.0	–10.1
Green	David Kellock	130	4.2	±0.0
Majority		180	5.8	–3.3
Turnout		3,098	30.4	
Registered electors		10,199		
Conservative hold				

Coalville South
Party	Candidate	Votes	%	±%
Reform	Paul Harrison	1,611	44.8	N/A
Liberal Democrats	Michael Wyatt	807	22.4	–8.8
Conservative	Aimee Garner	606	16.8	–26.4
Labour	Carissma Griffiths	378	10.5	–8.2
Green	Robert Clarke	197	5.5	±0.0
Majority		804	22.4	N/A
Turnout		3,599	28.2	
Registered electors		12,746		
Reform gain from Conservative				

Forest & Measham
Party	Candidate	Votes	%	±%
Reform	Adam Tilbury	1,353	45.4	+43.4
Conservative	Andrew Woodman	759	25.5	–27.3
Labour	Michelle Holdcroft	609	20.4	–15.9
Liberal Democrats	David Wyatt	136	4.6	+2.3
Green	Pritesh Patel	124	4.2	–2.3
Majority		594	19.9	N/A
Turnout		2,981	30.4	
Registered electors		9,822		
Reform gain from Conservative		Swing	▲35.4	

Ibstock & Appleby
Party	Candidate	Votes	%	±%
Reform	Virge Richichi	1,699	49.3	N/A
Conservative	Jenny Simmons	884	25.6	–30.8
Labour	Simon Lambeth	478	13.9	–15.7
Green	David Morgan	202	5.9	±0.0
Liberal Democrats	Lee Windram	184	5.3	–2.7
Majority		815	23.7	N/A
Turnout		3,447	33.2	
Registered electors		10,376		
Reform gain from Conservative				

Valley
Party	Candidate	Votes	%	±%
Reform	Michael Squires	1,467	36.2	+35.0
Conservative	Nick Rushton*	1,166	28.8	–20.7
Green	Carl Benfield	684	16.9	+4.1
Labour	Greg Parle	431	10.6	–19.4
Liberal Democrats	Paul Tyler	203	5.0	+0.8
Independent	Siobhan Dillon	99	2.4	N/A
Majority		301	7.4	N/A
Turnout		4,050	39.7	
Registered electors		10,191		
Reform gain from Conservative		Swing	▲27.9	

Whitwick
Party	Candidate	Votes	%	±%
Reform	Joseph Boam	1,601	44.8	+43.8
Conservative	Tony Gillard*	1,016	28.4	–33.8
Labour	Peter Moult	612	17.1	–9.1
Liberal Democrats	Morgan Burke	174	4.9	+0.8
Green	James Unwin	172	4.8	–0.2
Majority		585	16.4	N/A
Turnout		3,575	37.7	
Registered electors		9,483		
Reform gain from Conservative		Swing	▲38.8	

=== Oadby & Wigston ===
Oadby & Wigston district summary
Party	Seats	+/-	Votes	%	+/-
Liberal Democrats	3	▼1	6,916	35.3	–6.4
Reform UK	1	▲1	4,241	21.6	N/A
Independent	1	▲1	1,099	5.6	N/A
Conservative	0	▼1	4,708	24.0	–12.6
Labour	0	Steady	1,410	7.2	–8.6
Green	0	Steady	1,235	6.3	+0.5
Total	5	Steady	14,039	31.8	
Registered electors			44,126	–	

Division results

East Wigston
Party	Candidate	Votes	%	±%
Independent	Michael Charlesworth*	1,099	32.1	N/A
Reform	Don Howat	897	26.2	N/A
Conservative	Liz Darling	652	19.1	–22.5
Liberal Democrats	Lee Bentley	512	15.0	–29.8
Labour	Bridget Fitzpatrick	142	4.1	–4.9
Green	Samuel Hilton	120	3.5	–1.0
Majority		202	5.9	N/A
Turnout		3,422	36.3	
Registered electors		9,435		
Independent gain from Liberal Democrats				

North Wigston
Party	Candidate	Votes	%	±%
Liberal Democrats	Linda Broadley*	882	32.4	–12.0
Reform	John Ball	740	27.2	N/A
Conservative	Kartik Kavi	690	25.3	–4.6
Labour	Jay Dyas	214	7.9	–11.3
Green	Ahmed Khwaja	199	7.3	+0.9
Majority		142	5.2	–9.3
Turnout		2,725	32.2	
Registered electors		8,458		
Liberal Democrats hold				

Oadby (2 seats)
Party	Candidate	Votes	%	±%
Liberal Democrats	Moin Durrani	2,456	44.5	+6.4
Liberal Democrats	Dean Gamble*	2,445	44.3	+4.7
Conservative	Salim Boodhoo	1,467	26.6	–12.0
Conservative	Harry Rai	1,314	23.8	–14.2
Reform	Mark Hunt	953	17.3	N/A
Reform	Duncan Thompson	743	13.5	N/A
Labour	Matthew Luke	486	8.8	–8.2
Labour	William Pugsley	427	7.7	–9.2
Green	Bethan Painter	408	7.4	±0.0
Green	Doreen Shipton	342	6.2	+1.3
Turnout		~5,521	31.5	
Registered electors		17,522		
Liberal Democrats gain from Conservative				
Liberal Democrats hold				

South & West Wigston
Party	Candidate	Votes	%	±%
Reform	John McDonald	908	38.3	N/A
Liberal Democrats	Bill Boulter*	621	26.2	–24.1
Conservative	John Ford	535	22.6	–7.0
Green	James Bayliss	166	7.0	+2.0
Labour	Eileen Pott	141	5.9	–9.1
Majority		287	12.1	N/A
Turnout		2,371	27.2	
Registered electors		8,711		
Reform gain from Liberal Democrats				

== By-elections ==
Narborough & Whetstone, 16 April 2026
Party	Candidate	Votes	%	±%
Reform	Dee North	1,033	33.0	−9.3
Conservative	Les Phillimore	927	29.6	+5.1
Green	Mike Jelfs	884	28.2	+13.4
Liberal Democrats	Ande Savage	134	4.3	−3.6
Labour	Lisa Pendery-Hunt	124	4.0	−4.8
Advance UK	Martin Garfoot	28	0.9	N/A
Majority		106	3.4	N/A
Turnout		3,138	29.6	−1.4
Rejected ballots		7	0.2	
Registered electors		10,618		
Reform hold				

Shepshed, 15 October 2026 Resignation of Helen Butler (Reform UK)
Party	Candidate	Votes	%	±%
Labour	Jane Lennie	1,163	32.8	+14.9
Reform	Stuart Wood	1,110	31.3	−13.6
Conservative	Sarah Monk	819	23.1	−2.4
Restore	Alec McKenzie	228	6.4	N/A
Liberal Democrats	Katy Brookes-Duncan	115	3.2	−3.4
Green	David Kellock	112	3.2	−1.9
Majority		53	1.5	−18.0
Rejected ballots		7	0.2	
Turnout		3,554	29.7	−4.7
Registered electors		11,988		
Labour gain from Reform		Swing	▲14.3	

== See also ==
- Leicestershire County Council elections
