= 2009 Leicestershire County Council election =

2009 UK local government election

← 2005	5 June 2009	2013 →

All 55 seats to Leicestershire County Council 28 seats needed for a majority
	First party	Second party
Party	Conservative	Liberal Democrats
Last election	30	12
Seats before	31	11
Seats won	36	14
Seat change	▲6	▲2
Popular vote	96,123	58,814
Percentage	44.3%	27.1%
Swing	▲2.6%	▼1.4%
	Third party	Fourth party
Party	Labour	BNP
Last election	13	0
Seats before	12	0
Seats won	4	1
Seat change	▼9	▲1
Popular vote	33,549	26,279
Percentage	15.5%	12.1%
Swing	▼10.5%	▲10.9%
- Map showing the results of the 2009 Leicestershire County Council elections.
Party before election
Conservative
Elected Party
Conservative

Elections to Leicestershire County Council took place on 4 June 2009, having been delayed from 7 May, in order to coincide with elections to the European Parliament. A total of 55 councillors were elected from 52 electoral divisions across the county's 7 districts. The Conservatives held control of the council and increased their majority from 5 to 17 seats after gaining many seats from Labour who lost 70% of their seats. The BNP fielded many more candidates than at the last election which caused their vote share to increase dramatically.

== Results ==
Leicestershire County Council election, 2009
Party	Seats	Gains	Losses	Net gain/loss	Seats %	Votes %	Votes	+/−
Conservative	36	7	1	+6	65.5	44.3	96,123	+2.6
Liberal Democrats	14	3	1	+2	25.5	27.1	58,814	−1.4
Labour	4	0	9	−9	7.2	15.5	33,549	−10.5
BNP	1	1	0	+1	1.8	12.1	26,279	+10.9
Independent	0	0	0	±0	0.0	0.9	1,941	−1.4
English Democrat	0	0	0	±0	0.0	0.1	436	New

== Division results ==
Results for individual divisions are shown below. They have been divided into their respective Districts or Boroughs and listed alphabetically.

=== District of Blaby ===
Blaby and Glen Parva (1 seat)
Party	Candidate	Votes	%	±%
Liberal Democrats	Alan Bailey	1,949	54.1	+3.7
Conservative	Marian Broomhead	960	26.7	−3.8
BNP	Roy Dodge	455	12.6	N/A
Labour	Gary Jacques	238	6.6	−12.5
Turnout		3,602	38.7	
Liberal Democrats hold		Swing	+3.8	

Braunstone Town (1 seat)
Party	Candidate	Votes	%	±%
Labour	Jo Fox	1,214	37.7	−9.9
Conservative	Damian Stuart	1,045	32.5	−1.1
BNP	Gary Reynolds	547	17.0	N/A
Liberal Democrats	Felicity Pollard	412	12.8	−6.0
Turnout		3,218	38.3	
Labour hold		Swing	−4.4	

Cosby and Countesthorpe (1 seat)
Party	Candidate	Votes	%	±%
Conservative	David Jennings	2,097	57.9	+7.8
Liberal Democrats	Geoffrey Welsh	597	16.5	−8.7
Labour	Michael Howkins	488	13.5	−11.2
BNP	Martin Brown	442	12.2	N/A
Turnout		3,624	40.4	
Conservative hold		Swing	+8.3	

Enderby Meridian (1 seat)
Party	Candidate	Votes	%	±%
Conservative	Jackie Dickinson	1,543	53.4	+16.5
Labour	Bill Wright	720	24.9	−10.7
BNP	Michael Robinson	626	21.7	+14.2
Turnout		2,889	32.2	
Conservative hold		Swing	+13.6	

Glenfields (1 seat)
Party	Candidate	Votes	%	±%
Conservative	Brian Page	1,253	39.9	+1.1
Liberal Democrats	John Springthorpe	1,161	37.0	+6.7
BNP	John Walton	505	16.1	+11.7
Labour	David Hodgen	218	6.9	−16.3
Turnout		3,137	40.2	
Conservative hold		Swing	−2.8	

Kirby Muxloe and Leicester Forest East (1 seat)
Party	Candidate	Votes	%	±%
Conservative	David Parsons	2,122	59.2	+5.2
Labour	Malcolm Fox	502	14.0	−11.6
Liberal Democrats	David Pollard	488	13.6	−1.7
BNP	Paul Preston	474	13.2	+8.1
Turnout		3,586	40.7	
Conservative hold		Swing	+8.4	

Narborough and Whetstone (1 seat)
Party	Candidate	Votes	%	±%
Conservative	Barry Garner	1,960	54.4	+10.8
Liberal Democrats	Alex Dilks	628	17.4	±0.0
BNP	Kerri Sharpe	532	14.8	N/A
Labour	David Hodgen	483	13.4	−12.3
Turnout		3,603	35.1	
Conservative hold		Swing	+5.4	

Stanton Croft and Normanton (1 seat)
Party	Candidate	Votes	%	±%
Conservative	Ernie White	2,197	57.2	−9.2
Liberal Democrats	David Searle	768	20.0	N/A
BNP	Maurice Collett	506	13.2	N/A
Labour	Sandra Parkinson	368	9.6	−24.0
Turnout		3,839	40.5	
Conservative hold		Swing	−14.6	

=== Borough of Charnwood ===
Birstall (1 seat)
Party	Candidate	Votes	%	±%
Liberal Democrats	Roger Wilson	1,489	36.9	−24.0
Conservative	Stuart Jones	1,442	35.7	−3.4
BNP	Peter Cheeseman	644	15.9	N/A
Labour	Claire Poole	464	11.5	N/A
Turnout		4,039	42.4	
Liberal Democrats hold		Swing	−10.3	

Bradgate (1 seat)
Party	Candidate	Votes	%	±%
Conservative	David Snartt	2,475	57.9	+5.9
Liberal Democrats	Geoffrey Welsh	1,259	29.5	−11.2
BNP	James Taylor	538	12.6	+5.3
Turnout		4,272	44.5	
Conservative hold		Swing	+8.6	

Loughborough East (1 seat)
Party	Candidate	Votes	%	±%
Labour	Jewel Miah	1,597	48.8	−7.2
Conservative	Jenny Bokor	674	20.6	+0.4
Liberal Democrats	Christopher Maden	572	17.5	+1.5
BNP	Kevan Stafford	432	13.2	N/A
Turnout		3,275	35.0	
Labour hold		Swing	−3.8	

Loughborough North (1 seat)
Party	Candidate	Votes	%	±%
Labour	Betty Newton	1,321	40.1	−1.1
Conservative	Jane Hunt	1,035	31.4	+0.8
BNP	Julia Green	506	15.4	+11.2
Liberal Democrats	Diane Horn	432	13.1	−10.9
Turnout		3,294	33.2	
Labour hold		Swing	−1.0	

Loughborough North West (1 seat)
Party	Candidate	Votes	%	±%
Labour	Max Hunt	1,408	44.0	−2.7
Conservative	David Goss	884	27.6	−4.5
Independent	Roy Campsall	625	19.5	N/A
BNP	Gavin Leist	281	8.8	N/A
Turnout		3,198	33.0	
Labour hold		Swing	+0.9	

Loughborough South (1 seat)
Party	Candidate	Votes	%	±%
Conservative	David Slater	1,289	36.1	+2.9
Labour	Neville Stork	1,264	35.4	−3.2
Liberal Democrats	Roy Kershaw	573	16.1	−5.4
BNP	Michael Pickering	442	12.4	N/A
Turnout		3,568	32.5	
Conservative gain from Labour		Swing	−3.1	

Loughborough South West (1 seat)
Party	Candidate	Votes	%	±%
Conservative	Peter Lewis	1,947	50.3	+6.7
Liberal Democrats	David Walker	1,034	26.7	−2.3
Labour	David Goss	617	15.9	−6.2
BNP	Christopher Canham	272	7.0	N/A
Turnout		3,870	42.2	
Conservative hold		Swing	+4.5	

Quorn and Barrow (1 seat)
Party	Candidate	Votes	%	±%
Conservative	Tony Kershaw	1,983	53.3	+8.5
Liberal Democrats	Stephen Coltman	662	17.8	−4.4
Labour	Sandie Forrest	619	16.6	−12.7
BNP	Maurice Oatley	459	12.3	+8.6
Turnout		3,723	41.6	
Conservative hold		Swing	+6.5	

Rothley and Mountsorrel (1 seat)
Party	Candidate	Votes	%	±%
Conservative	Peter Osborne	1,878	51.7	+5.8
Liberal Democrats	Ted Smith	664	18.3	+1.7
BNP	Carol Collett	650	17.9	+11.6
Labour	Justin Smith	443	12.2	−19.0
Turnout		3,635	38.7	
Conservative hold		Swing	+2.1	

Shepshed (1 seat)
Party	Candidate	Votes	%	±%
Conservative	Christine Radford	1,466	32.9	−3.9
Labour	Kevin Parker	1,123	25.2	−17.7
Liberal Democrats	Cynthia Popley	1,094	24.5	+4.2
BNP	Edmond Thomson	778	17.4	N/A
Turnout		4,461	41.2	
Conservative gain from Labour		Swing	−6.9	

Sileby and the Wolds (1 seat)
Party	Candidate	Votes	%	±%
Conservative	Richard Shepherd	1,795	52.1	+1.3
Liberal Democrats	Peter Collingswood	724	21.0	+0.3
BNP	Stephen Denham	497	14.4	N/A
Labour	Ivor Perry	431	12.5	−16.0
Turnout		3,447	40.3	
Conservative hold		Swing	+0.5	

Syston Fosse (1 seat)
Party	Candidate	Votes	%	±%
Conservative	Dave Houseman	1,714	56.3	+5.5
BNP	Catherine Duffy	779	25.6	+14.9
Labour	Terry Bark	549	18.0	−20.5
Turnout		3,042	36.2	
Conservative hold		Swing	−4.7	

Syston Ridgeway (1 seat)
Party	Candidate	Votes	%	±%
Conservative	Michael Preston	1,688	52.6	−2.8
BNP	John Hurst	621	19.4	N/A
Liberal Democrats	Fiona Henry	558	17.4	+1.6
Labour	Mike McLoughlin	341	10.6	−18.1
Turnout		3,208	39.7	
Conservative hold		Swing	+0.5	

The Conservative councillor for Syston Ridgeway died on Thursday 18 August 2011. A by-election was held on 3 November 2011 and was won by Stephen John Hampson.

Thurmaston (1 seat)
Party	Candidate	Votes	%	±%
Conservative	Paul Harley	1,322	48.9	+7.6
Labour	Steve Brown	593	21.9	−14.3
BNP	John Hurst	529	19.6	+12.6
Liberal Democrats	Bernard Singleton	260	9.6	−1.9
Turnout		2,704	36.9	
Conservative hold		Swing	+11.0	
