= 2013 Leicestershire County Council election =

2013 UK local government election

← 2009	2 May 2013	2017 →

All 55 seats to Leicestershire County Council 28 seats needed for a majority
	First party	Second party
Party	Conservative	Liberal Democrats
Seats won	30	13
Seat change	▼6	▼1
Swing	▼4.9	▼7.9
	Third party	Fourth party
Party	Labour	UKIP
Seats won	10	2
Seat change	▲6	▲2
Swing	▲8.8	N/A
- Map showing the results of the 2013 Leicestershire County Council elections.
Council control before election
Conservative
Council control after election
Conservative

An election to Leicestershire County Council took place on 2 May 2013 as part of the 2013 United Kingdom local elections. 55 councillors were elected from 52 electoral divisions, which returned either one or two county councillors each by first-past-the-post voting for a four-year term of office. The Conservatives held control of the council with a reduced majority of 5 seats. Despite a strong challenge from UKIP, the party only gained 2 seats (including one where the sitting Conservative councillor had previously defected to UKIP) whilst the Liberal Democrats lost one seat and Labour recouped some of their 2009 losses, gaining 6 seats.

All locally registered electors (British, Irish, Commonwealth and European Union citizens) who were aged 18 or over on Thursday 2 May 2013 were entitled to vote in the local elections. Those who were temporarily away from their ordinary address (for example, away working, on holiday, in student accommodation or in hospital) were also entitled to vote in the local elections, although those who had moved abroad and registered as overseas electors cannot vote in the local elections. It is possible to register to vote at more than one address (such as a university student who had a term-time address and lives at home during holidays) at the discretion of the local Electoral Register Office, but it remains an offence to vote more than once in the same local government election.

== Results ==
Leicestershire County Council election, 2013
Party	Seats	Gains	Losses	Net gain/loss	Seats %	Votes %	Votes	+/−
Conservative	30	1	7	−6	54.6	39.5	66,687	−4.9
Liberal Democrats	13	0	1	−1	23.6	19.2	32,496	−7.9
Labour	10	6	0	+6	18.2	24.3	41,145	+8.8
UKIP	2	2	0	+2	3.6	13.4	22,722	New
Independent	0	0	0	±0	0	2.1	3,563	+1.2
BNP	0	0	1	−1	0	0.9	1,542	−11.2
TUSC	0	0	0	±0	0	0.3	478	New
British Democrats	0	0	0	±0	0	0.3	421	New

== Results by electoral division ==
Results for individual divisions are shown below. They have been divided into their respective Districts or Boroughs and listed alphabetically.

=== District of Blaby ===
(8 seats, 8 Electoral Divisions)

Blaby District Summary Result
Party	Seats	Gains	Losses	Net gain/loss	Seats %	Votes %	Votes	+/−
Conservative	5	0	1	−1	62.5	47.6	9,429	−0.3
Labour	1	0	0	±0	12.5	30.9	6,120	+15.5
Liberal Democrats	1	0	0	±0	12.5	14.2	2,812	−7.6
UKIP	1	1	0	+1	12.5	4.4	881	N/A
Independent	0	0	0	±0	0.0	2.5	492	N/A
BNP	0	0	0	±0	0.0	0.4	76	−14.5

Blaby and Glen Parva (1 seat)
Party	Candidate	Votes	%	±%
Liberal Democrats	Geoff Welsh	1,638	63.0	+8.9
Conservative	Tony Greenwood	653	25.1	−1.6
Labour	Shabbir Aslam	308	11.9	+5.3
Turnout		2,599	27.7	−11.0
Liberal Democrats hold		Swing	+5.3	

Braunstone Town (1 seat)
Party	Candidate	Votes	%	±%
Labour	Jo Fox	1,356	61.1	+23.4
Conservative	Les Phillimore	864	38.9	+6.4
Turnout		2,220	26.0	−12.3
Labour hold		Swing	+8.5	

Cosby and Countesthorpe (1 seat)
Party	Candidate	Votes	%	±%
Conservative	David Jennings	1,505	55.5	−2.4
Labour	Mike Howkins	739	27.2	+13.7
Liberal Democrats	Mick Munn	470	17.3	+0.8
Turnout		2,714	29.1	−11.3
Conservative hold		Swing	−8.1	

Enderby Meridian (1 seat)
Party	Candidate	Votes	%	±%
Conservative	Jackie Dickinson	848	39.5	−13.9
Labour	Amanda Hack	809	37.6	+12.7
Independent	Brian Coleman	492	22.9	N/A
Turnout		2,149	22.4	−9.8
Conservative hold		Swing	−13.3	

Glenfields (1 seat)
Party	Candidate	Votes	%	±%
UKIP	Lynton Yates	881	35.2	N/A
Conservative	Lee Breckon	815	32.5	−7.4
Liberal Democrats	John Springthorpe	448	17.9	−19.1
Labour	Glenn Thurlby	285	11.4	+4.5
BNP	Peter Cheeseman	76	3.0	−13.1
Turnout		2,505	31.6	−8.6
UKIP gain from Conservative		Swing	−21.6	

Kirby Muxloe and Leicester Forest East (1 seat)
Party	Candidate	Votes	%	±%
Conservative	Richard Blunt	1,484	57.0	−2.2
Labour	Malcolm Fox	1,118	43.0	+29.0
Turnout		2,602	29.5	−11.2
Conservative hold		Swing	−15.6	

Narborough and Whetstone (1 seat)
Party	Candidate	Votes	%	±%
Conservative	Karl Coles	1,458	59.3	+4.9
Labour	Michael Bounds	746	30.3	+16.9
Liberal Democrats	Bev Welsh	256	10.4	−7.0
Turnout		2,460	23.4	−11.7
Conservative hold		Swing	−6.0	

Stanton, Croft and Normanton (1 seat)
Party	Candidate	Votes	%	±%
Conservative	Ernie White	1,802	70.4	+13.2
Labour	Steve Crane	759	29.6	+20.0
Turnout		2,561	26.3	−14.2
Conservative hold		Swing	−3.4	

=== Borough of Charnwood ===
(14 seats, 14 Electoral Divisions)

Charnwood Borough Summary Result
Party	Seats	Gains	Losses	Net gain/loss	Seats %	Votes %	Votes	+/−
Conservative	9	1	2	−1	64.3	42.2	15,741	−1.2
Labour	5	2	0	+2	35.7	36.0	13,405	+14.3
UKIP	0	0	0	±0	0.0	8.2	3,067	N/A
Liberal Democrats	0	0	1	−1	0.0	7.1	2,641	−11.6
BNP	0	0	0	±0	0.0	3.9	1,466	−11.0
Independent	0	0	0	±0	0.0	1.5	556	+0.2
TUSC	0	0	0	±0	0.0	0.6	230	N/A
British Democrats	0	0	0	±0	0.0	0.5	206	N/A

Birstall (1 seat)
Party	Candidate	Votes	%	±%
Conservative	Iain Bentley	1,152	37.8	+2.1
Liberal Democrats	Simon Sansome	975	32.0	−4.9
Labour	Marion Smith	659	21.6	+10.1
BNP	Ken Tilson	258	8.5	−7.4
Turnout		3,044	29.5	−12.9
Conservative gain from Liberal Democrats		Swing	+3.5	

Bradgate (1 seat)
Party	Candidate	Votes	%	±%
Conservative	David Snartt	2,023	64.3	+6.4
Labour	Glyn McAllister	580	18.4	N/A
BNP	Jim Taylor	297	9.4	−3.2
Liberal Democrats	Christine Bilby	247	7.8	−21.7
Turnout		3,147	31.6	−12.9
Conservative hold		Swing	−6.0	

Loughborough East (1 seat)
Party	Candidate	Votes	%	±%
Labour	Jewel Miah	1,634	67.3	+18.5
Conservative	Judith Spence	496	20.4	−0.2
TUSC	Lauren Foster	170	7.0	N/A
Liberal Democrats	Mike Willis	128	5.3	−12.2
Turnout		2,428	25.2	−9.8
Labour hold		Swing	+9.4	

Loughborough North (1 seat)
Party	Candidate	Votes	%	±%
Labour	Betty Newton	1,588	65.2	+25.1
Conservative	Jenny Bokor	729	29.9	−1.5
Liberal Democrats	Robin Popley	120	4.9	−8.2
Turnout		2,437	23.8	−9.4
Labour hold		Swing	+13.3	

Loughborough North West (1 seat)
Party	Candidate	Votes	%	±%
Labour	Max Hunt	1,164	54.3	+10.3
Independent	Roy Campsall	556	25.9	+6.4
Conservative	Ron Jukes	362	16.9	−10.7
Liberal Democrats	Simon Atkins	62	2.9	N/A
Turnout		2,144	20.7	−12.3
Labour hold		Swing	+2.0	

Loughborough South (1 seat)
Party	Candidate	Votes	%	±%
Labour	Robert Sharp	1,449	51.8	+16.4
Conservative	David Slater	921	32.9	−3.2
British Democrats	Kevin Stafford	206	7.4	N/A
Liberal Democrats	Diana Brass	162	5.8	−10.3
TUSC	Tony Onions	60	2.1	N/A
Turnout		2,798	24.6	−7.9
Labour gain from Conservative		Swing	+9.8	

Loughborough South West (1 seat)
Party	Candidate	Votes	%	±%
Conservative	Peter Lewis	1,512	54.5	+4.2
Labour	Mike Cahill	1,046	37.7	+21.8
Liberal Democrats	David Scott	214	7.7	−19.0
Turnout		2,772	32.4	−9.8
Conservative hold		Swing	−8.8	

Quorn and Barrow (1 seat)
Party	Candidate	Votes	%	±%
Conservative	Tony Kershaw	1,385	45.9	−7.4
Labour	Alice Brennan	880	29.2	+12.6
UKIP	Andrew McWilliam	607	20.1	N/A
Liberal Democrats	Stephen Coltman	145	4.8	−13.0
Turnout		3,017	31.2	−11.0
Conservative hold		Swing	−10.0	

Rothley and Mountsorrel (1 seat)
Party	Candidate	Votes	%	±%
Conservative	Peter Osborne	1,308	47.9	−3.8
UKIP	Jamie Bye	730	26.7	N/A
Labour	Sarah Maynard	695	25.4	+13.2
Turnout		2,733	27.9	−10.8
Conservative hold		Swing	−15.3	

Shepshed (1 seat)
Party	Candidate	Votes	%	±%
Conservative	Christine Radford	1,262	36.0	+3.1
Labour	Claire Poole	1,179	33.7	+8.5
UKIP	Alexis Hira	685	19.6	N/A
Liberal Democrats	Diane Horn	375	10.7	−13.8
Turnout		3,501	32.1	−9.1
Conservative hold		Swing	−2.7	

Sileby and the Wolds (1 seat)
Party	Candidate	Votes	%	±%
Conservative	Richard Shepherd	1,396	60.5	+8.4
Labour	Gous Ali	492	21.3	+8.8
Liberal Democrats	Ian Sharpe	213	9.2	−11.8
BNP	Maurice Oatley	205	8.9	−5.5
Turnout		2,306	26.7	−13.6
Conservative hold		Swing	−0.2	

Syston Fosse (1 seat)
Party	Candidate	Votes	%	±%
Conservative	Dave Houseman	1,070	47.3	−9.0
UKIP	Ronald Jenkins	476	21.1	N/A
Labour	Stephen Rose	457	20.2	+2.2
BNP	Cathy Duffy	258	11.4	−14.2
Turnout		2,261	26.5	−9.7
Conservative hold		Swing	−15.1	

Syston Ridgeway (1 seat)
Party	Candidate	Votes	%	±%
Conservative	Stephen Hampson	1,154	47.7	−4.9
UKIP	Chris Scotton	569	23.5	N/A
Labour	Michael McLoughlin	488	20.2	+9.6
BNP	Stephen Denham	206	8.5	−10.9
Turnout		2,417	28.1	−11.6
Conservative hold		Swing	−14.2	

Thurmaston (1 seat)
Party	Candidate	Votes	%	±%
Labour	Kate Knaggs	1,094	47.4	+25.5
Conservative	Paul Harley	971	42.1	−6.8
BNP	Robin Derrick	242	10.5	−9.1
Turnout		2,307	30.0	−6.9
Labour gain from Conservative		Swing	+16.2	

=== District of Harborough ===
(7 seats, 7 Electoral Divisions)

Harborough District Summary Result
Party	Seats	Gains	Losses	Net gain/loss	Seats %	Votes %	Votes	+/−
Conservative	5	0	0	±0	71.4	44.8	9,808	−10.8
Liberal Democrats	2	0	0	±0	28.6	23.1	5,056	−4.4
Labour	0	0	0	±0	0.0	15.1	3,296	+4.6
UKIP	0	0	0	±0	0.0	14.6	3,193	N/A
Independent	0	0	0	±0	0.0	2.4	518	+0.8

Broughton Astley (1 seat)
Party	Candidate	Votes	%	±%
Conservative	Bill Liquorish	1,544	68.7	−12.4
Labour	Sandra Parkinson	521	23.2	+4.3
Liberal Democrats	Antony Moseley	183	8.1	N/A
Turnout		2,248	26.3	−8.9
Conservative hold		Swing	−8.4	

Bruntingthorpe (1 seat)
Party	Candidate	Votes	%	±%
Conservative	Graham Hart	1,555	50.5	−15.7
UKIP	Tim Johnson	723	23.5	N/A
Labour	Elaine Carter	572	18.6	+7.8
Liberal Democrats	Kevin Loydall	229	7.4	−15.6
Turnout		3,079	31.9	−9.1
Conservative hold		Swing	−19.6	

Gartree (1 seat)
Party	Candidate	Votes	%	±%
Conservative	Kevin Feltham	1,937	54.6	−17.1
UKIP	Brett Lynes	888	25.0	N/A
Labour	Peter Craig	471	13.3	+7.4
Liberal Democrats	Grahame Hudson	253	7.1	−15.3
Turnout		3,549	33.8	−9.0
Conservative hold		Swing	−21.1	

Launde (1 seat)
Party	Candidate	Votes	%	±%
Liberal Democrats	Simon Galton	1,989	58.6	+3.9
Conservative	Simon Whelband	1,134	33.4	−2.2
Labour	Ian Snaith	272	8.0	+4.2
Turnout		3,395	37.4	−12.6
Liberal Democrats hold		Swing	+3.1	

Lutterworth (1 seat)
Party	Candidate	Votes	%	±%
Conservative	Rosita Page	1,525	54.4	−5.3
Labour	David Gair	758	27.1	+0.1
Independent	Martin Sears	518	18.5	N/A
Turnout		2,801	31.6	−9.2
Conservative hold		Swing	−2.7	

Market Harborough East (1 seat)
Party	Candidate	Votes	%	±%
Liberal Democrats	Sarah Hill	1,252	38.2	−1.3
Conservative	Phil King	945	28.8	−9.9
UKIP	Michael Gerard	777	23.7	N/A
Labour Co-op	Carol Wood	304	9.3	+3.8
Turnout		3,278	34.9	−5.7
Liberal Democrats hold		Swing	+4.3	

Market Harborough West and Foxton (1 seat)
Party	Candidate	Votes	%	±%
Conservative	Blake Pain	1,168	33.2	−9.4
Liberal Democrats	Phil Knowles	1,150	32.7	−9.7
UKIP	Robert Davison	805	22.9	N/A
Labour	Anne Pridmore	398	11.3	+5.7
Turnout		3,521	34.8	−3.0
Conservative hold		Swing	+0.2	

=== Borough of Hinckley and Bosworth ===
(9 seats, 7 Electoral Divisions)

Hinckley and Bosworth Borough Summary Result
Party	Seats	Gains	Losses	Net gain/loss	Seats %	Votes %	Votes	+/−
Conservative	4	0	1	−1	44.4	37.8	13,568	−4.0
Liberal Democrats	4	0	0	±0	44.4	31.8	11,432	−5.1
UKIP	1	1	0	+1	11.2	15.1	5,437	N/A
Labour	0	0	0	±0	0.0	14.5	5,217	+4.0
TUSC	0	0	0	±0	0.0	0.7	248	N/A

Burbage Castle (2 seats)
Party	Candidate	Votes	%	±%
Liberal Democrats	Stuart Bray	2,338	23.0	−1.5
Liberal Democrats	Keith Lynch	2,338	23.0	−1.3
Conservative	Amanda Wright	2,152	21.2	+2.3
Conservative	Peter Wallace	2,113	20.8	+2.4
Labour	David Hodgen	536	5.3	−0.7
Labour	Tony Simhani	441	4.3	+1.3
TUSC	Michael Clifford	248	2.4	N/A
Turnout		5,083	30.1	−6.1
Liberal Democrats hold		Swing		
Liberal Democrats hold		Swing		

Division Summary
Party	Votes	% Votes	±%	Seats	Change
Liberal Democrats	4,676	46.0	−2.8	2	
Conservative	4,265	42.0	+4.9	0	
Labour	977	9.6	+0.6	0	
TUSC	248	2.4	N/A	0	
Total Votes Cast	10,166				

Earl Shilton (1 seat)
Party	Candidate	Votes	%	±%
Conservative	Janice Richards	918	35.3	−3.5
Labour	Denis Bown	848	32.6	+5.7
UKIP	Derek Marvin	655	25.2	N/A
Liberal Democrats	Mathew Hulbert	178	6.8	−8.2
Turnout		2,599	26.7	−10.2
Conservative hold		Swing	−4.6	

Groby and Ratby (1 seat)
Party	Candidate	Votes	%	±%
Conservative	Ozzy O'Shea	1,459	52.6	−4.2
UKIP	Rob Fraser	573	20.6	N/A
Liberal Democrats	Ted Hollick	418	15.1	+3.2
Labour	Terry Gallagher	326	11.7	−3.6
Turnout		2,776	30.7	−7.5
Conservative hold		Swing	−12.4	

Hinckley (2 seats)
Party	Candidate	Votes	%	±%
Liberal Democrats	David Bill	2,378	23.9	−2.9
Liberal Democrats	Michael Mullaney	2,036	20.5	−3.2
UKIP	Gary Cart	1,404	14.1	N/A
Conservative	Alan Ottey	1,388	14.0	−4.7
Conservative	Rosemary Wright	1,368	13.8	−2.5
Labour	Clark Mitchell	696	7.0	+2.7
Labour	Eamonn Gabriel	675	6.8	+3.7
Turnout		4,973	25.1	−5.2
Liberal Democrats hold		Swing		
Liberal Democrats hold		Swing		

Division Summary
Party	Votes	% Votes	±%	Seats	Change
Liberal Democrats	4,414	44.4	−6.1	2	
Conservative	2,756	27.7	−7.3	0	
UKIP	1,404	14.1	N/A	0	
Labour	1,371	13.8	+6.5	0	
Total Votes Cast	9,945				

Mallory (1 seat)
Party	Candidate	Votes	%	±%
Conservative	Ruth Camamile	837	32.4	−0.7
UKIP	Gordon Davis	799	31.0	N/A
Liberal Democrats	Joyce Crooks	486	18.8	−13.0
Labour Co-op	Andre Wheeler	459	17.8	+9.1
Turnout		2,581	28.8	−7.1
Conservative hold		Swing	−15.9	

Market Bosworth (1 seat)
Party	Candidate	Votes	%	±%
Conservative	Ivan Ould	2,108	49.6	−5.9
Liberal Democrats	Bill Crooks	996	23.5	−5.1
UKIP	Aaron Yates	714	16.8	N/A
Labour	Steven Malcherczyk	428	10.1	+3.5
Turnout		4,246	39.4	−8.5
Conservative hold		Swing	−0.4	

Markfield, Desford and Thornton (1 seat)
Party	Candidate	Votes	%	±%
UKIP	David Sprason	1,292	36.0	N/A
Conservative	Peter Bedford	1,225	34.1	−21.6
Labour	Tom Neilson	808	22.5	+9.4
Liberal Democrats	Dianne Finney	264	7.4	−8.5
Turnout		3,589	36.6	−5.9
UKIP gain from Conservative		Swing	+28.8	

=== Borough of Melton ===
(4 seats, 4 Electoral Divisions)

Melton Borough Summary Result
Party	Seats	Gains	Losses	Net gain/loss	Seats %	Votes %	Votes	+/−
Conservative	4	0	0	±0	100.0	50.6	5,787	−2.1
Labour	0	0	0	±0	0.0	20.2	2,313	+3.4
UKIP	0	0	0	±0	0.0	14.9	1,702	N/A
Independent	0	0	0	±0	0.0	14.3	1,630	+11.9

Asfordby (1 seat)
Party	Candidate	Votes	%	±%
Conservative	Joe Orson	1,985	79.2	+19.7
Labour	Mike Brown	520	20.8	+9.2
Turnout		2,505	29.1	−13.4
Conservative hold		Swing	+5.3	

Belvoir (1 seat)
Party	Candidate	Votes	%	±%
Conservative	Byron Rhodes	1,585	47.2	−13.7
UKIP	Chris Hardcastle	673	20.0	N/A
Independent	Elaine Holmes	658	19.6	N/A
Labour	Lin Machin	443	13.2	+3.4
Turnout		3,359	33.2	−11.0
Conservative hold		Swing	−16.9	

Melton North (1 seat)
Party	Candidate	Votes	%	±%
Conservative	Pam Posnett	1,359	41.7	−1.9
Labour	Trev Moncrieff	737	22.6	−8.4
Independent	Mark Twittey	617	18.9	N/A
UKIP	Malcolm Staples	548	16.8	N/A
Turnout		3,261	30.1	−6.8
Conservative hold		Swing	+3.3	

Melton South (1 seat)
Party	Candidate	Votes	%	±%
Conservative	Alan Pearson	848	36.9	−7.2
Labour	Gary Bush	613	26.7	+11.9
UKIP	Duncan Shelley	481	20.9	N/A
Independent	Alison Freer-Jones	202	8.8	N/A
Independent	Marilyn Gordon	153	6.7	N/A
Turnout		2,297	24.4	−6.1
Conservative hold		Swing	−9.6	

=== District of North West Leicestershire ===
(8 seats, 8 Electoral Divisions)

North West Leicestershire District Summary Result
Party	Seats	Gains	Losses	Net gain/loss	Seats %	Votes %	Votes	+/−
Labour	4	4	0	+4	50.0	34.8	7,993	+14.3
Conservative	3	0	3	−3	37.5	30.8	7,088	−10.2
Liberal Democrats	1	0	0	±0	12.5	8.8	2,034	−8.9
UKIP	0	0	0	±0	0.0	24.3	5,584	N/A
British Democrats	0	0	0	±0	0.0	0.9	215	N/A
Independent	0	0	0	±0	0.0	0.4	95	−1.8

Ashby de la Zouch (1 seat)
Party	Candidate	Votes	%	±%
Conservative	John Coxon	1,463	44.6	−5.3
Labour Co-op	Josh Mills	1,031	31.5	+13.5
UKIP	Jakob Whiten	623	19.0	N/A
Liberal Democrats	Maureen Wyatt	161	4.9	−17.9
Turnout		3,278	33.4	−10.1
Conservative hold		Swing	−9.4	

Castle Donington (1 seat)
Party	Candidate	Votes	%	±%
Conservative	Trevor Pendleton	1,095	40.0	−17.7
Labour	Patrick Lynch	780	28.5	+10.5
UKIP	John Scutter	726	26.5	N/A
Liberal Democrats	Kostijn Van Ginkel	138	5.0	−8.2
Turnout		2,739	29.2	−12.5
Conservative hold		Swing	−14.1	

Coalville (1 seat)
Party	Candidate	Votes	%	±%
Labour	Terri Eynon	1,294	44.7	+22.3
UKIP	Phil Holland	825	28.5	N/A
Conservative	John Cotterill	476	16.4	−9.0
British Democrats	Graham Partner ^	215	7.4	−20.3
Liberal Democrats	Lee Windram	84	2.9	−5.8
Turnout		2,894	28.2	−10.4
Labour gain from BNP		Swing	−3.1	

^ The sitting councillor Graham Partner had previously defected from the BNP to the newly formed British Democratic Party and so his vote share changes reflect the result he achieved in 2009.

Forest and Measham (1 seat)
Party	Candidate	Votes	%	±%
Labour Co-op	Sean Sheahan	1,113	40.3	+12.6
UKIP	Martin Green	843	30.5	N/A
Conservative	Geraint Jones	737	26.7	−11.7
Liberal Democrats	Daniel Bowler	72	2.6	−11.9
Turnout		2,765	28.0	−15.4
Labour Co-op gain from Conservative		Swing	−9.0	

Ibstock and Appleby (1 seat)
Party	Candidate	Votes	%	±%
Labour	Heather Worman	1,089	40.0	+18.3
Conservative	Nigel Smith	849	31.2	−8.9
UKIP	Peter Depper	637	23.3	N/A
Liberal Democrats	David Wyatt	146	5.4	−6.8
Turnout		2,721	28.2	−15.9
Labour gain from Conservative		Swing	+13.6	

Valley (1 seat)
Party	Candidate	Votes	%	±%
Conservative	Nicholas Rushton	1,260	46.1	−8.0
UKIP	Val Pulford	803	29.4	N/A
Labour	Mary Draycott	530	19.4	+6.5
Liberal Democrats	Alan Turner	138	5.1	−15.1
Turnout		2,731	35.9	−13.9
Conservative hold		Swing	−18.7	

Warren Hills (1 seat)
Party	Candidate	Votes	%	±%
Liberal Democrats	Michael Wyatt	1,187	46.3	+3.0
Labour Co-op	Dave De Lacy	717	28.0	+12.3
UKIP	Chris Argent	319	12.4	N/A
Conservative	Paula Purver	303	11.8	−11.4
Independent	James Collins	37	1.4	−1.7
Turnout		2,563	33.0	−9.5
Liberal Democrats hold		Swing	−4.7	

Whitwick (1 seat)
Party	Candidate	Votes	%	±%
Labour Co-op	Leon Spence	1,439	43.4	+17.6
Conservative	Tony Gillard	905	27.3	−9.7
UKIP	Tim Pulford	808	24.4	N/A
Liberal Democrats	David Siddon	108	3.3	−7.7
Independent	Mandy Jarvis	58	1.7	N/A
Turnout		3,318	36.4	−10.6
Labour Co-op gain from Conservative		Swing	+13.7	

=== Borough of Oadby and Wigston ===
(5 seats, 4 Electoral Divisions)

Oadby and Wigston Borough Summary Result
Party	Seats	Gains	Losses	Net gain/loss	Seats %	Votes %	Votes	+/−
Liberal Democrats	5	0	0	±0	100.0	43.7	8,521	−8.7
Conservative	0	0	0	±0	0.0	27.1	5,276	−5.7
Labour	0	0	0	±0	0.0	14.4	2,801	+4.8
UKIP	0	0	0	±0	0.0	13.5	2,628	N/A
Independent	0	0	0	±0	0.0	1.4	272	N/A

Oadby (2 seats)
Party	Candidate	Votes	%	±%
Liberal Democrats	Dean Gamble	2,526	21.4	−4.5
Liberal Democrats	Jeffrey Kaufman	2,380	20.1	−4.7
Conservative	Bhupendra Dave	2,037	17.2	−0.3
Conservative	Rani Mahal	1,804	15.3	−2.1
UKIP	Daniel Price	1,011	8.6	N/A
Labour	Valerie Jones	903	7.6	+1.3
Labour	Camille Naylor	886	7.5	+2.2
Independent	Gabriella Garcia	272	2.3	N/A
Turnout		5,910	30.6	−7.9
Liberal Democrats hold		Swing		
Liberal Democrats hold		Swing		

Division Summary
Party	Votes	% Votes	±%	Seats	Change
Liberal Democrats	4,906	41.5	−9.2	2	
Conservative	3,841	32.5	−2.4	0	
Labour	1,789	15.1	+3.5	0	
UKIP	1,011	8.6	N/A	0	
Independent	272	2.3	N/A	0	
Total Votes Cast	11,819				

Wigston Bushloe (1 seat)
Party	Candidate	Votes	%	±%
Liberal Democrats	Michael Charlesworth	1,416	44.3	−14.0
UKIP	Harry Jahangir	760	23.8	N/A
Conservative	Andrew Southerden	710	22.2	−14.0
Labour	Maureen Waugh	314	9.8	+4.3
Turnout		3,200	33.4	−6.2
Liberal Democrats hold		Swing	−18.9	

Wigston Poplars (1 seat)
Party	Candidate	Votes	%	±%
Liberal Democrats	Helen Loydall	1,221	45.1	−3.6
UKIP	Richard Billington	626	23.1	N/A
Conservative	David Beaumont	470	17.3	−14.3
Labour	Susan Howard	393	14.5	+5.7
Turnout		2,710	32.6	−7.7
Liberal Democrats hold		Swing	−13.4	

Wigston South (1 seat)
Party	Candidate	Votes	%	±%
Liberal Democrats	Bill Boulter	978	48.9	−8.4
UKIP	Clive Langley	461	23.1	N/A
Labour	Richard Price	305	15.3	+9.8
Conservative	Anne Bond	255	12.8	−5.5
Turnout		1,999	24.6	−8.8
Liberal Democrats hold		Swing	−15.8	
