= 2017 Leicestershire County Council election =

2017 UK local government election

← 2013	4 May 2017	2021 →

All 55 seats to Leicestershire County Council 28 seats needed for a majority
	First party	Second party	Third party
Party	Conservative	Liberal Democrats	Labour
Seats before	30	13	9
Seats won	36	13	6
Seat change	+6	0	-3
	Fourth party	Fifth party
Party	UKIP	Independent
Seats before	2	1
Seats won	0	0
Seat change	-2	-1
- Map showing the results of the 2017 Leicestershire County Council elections.
Council control before election
Conservative
Council control after election
Conservative

The 2017 Leicestershire County Council election took place on 4 May 2017 as part of the 2017 local elections in the United Kingdom. All councillors were elected from electoral divisions by first-past-the-post voting for a four-year term of office.

The Local Government Boundary Commission for England has undertaken a review of the county and has recommended a change to the boundaries of the electoral divisions. These changes took effect at this election. Leicestershire's 55 county councillors will represent 51 single-member electoral divisions and two two-member electoral divisions: Glenfields, Kirby Muxloe & Leicester Forests, and Oadby.

== Results ==
There are 55 seats on the county council. The Conservatives and Labour fielded 55 candidates with the Liberal Democrats fielding 53, the UK Independence Party fielding 43 and the Green Party fielding 18.

=== Overview ===
Leicestershire County Council election result 2017
Party	Seats	Gains	Losses	Net gain/loss	Seats %	Votes %	Votes	+/−
Conservative	36	7	1	6	65	50.3	89780	+10.5
Green	0	0	0	0	0	1.93	3446	+1.93
Labour	6	0	3	-3	11	20.5	36639	-3.8
Liberal Democrats	13	1	1	0	24	21.0	37546	+1.8
UKIP	0	0	2	-2	0	5.8	10425	-7.6
British Democrats	0	0	0	0	0	0.01	30	-0.3
Independent	0	0	1	-1	0	0.28	515	-1.82

== Results by electoral division ==
Results for individual divisions are shown below. They have been divided into their respective districts or boroughs and listed alphabetically.

=== District of Blaby ===
(8 seats, 7 Electoral Divisions)

Blaby District Summary Result
Party	Seats	Gains	Losses	Net gain/loss	Seats %	Votes %	Votes	+/−
Conservative	6	0	0	+1	75.0	54.6	14,681	+7.0
Labour	1	0	0	±0	12.5	20.7	5,574	–10.2
Liberal Democrats	1	0	0	±0	12.5	12.8	3,455	–1.4
UKIP	0	0	0	–1	0.0	8.5	2,293	+4.4

Blaby and Glen Parva (1 seat)
Party	Candidate	Votes	%	±%
Liberal Democrats	Geoff Welsh	1,728	56.5	–6.5
Conservative	Marian Gail Broomhead	906	29.6	+4.5
Labour	Shabbir Aslam	299	9.8	–2.1
UKIP	Alfie Garner	121	4.0	N/A
Turnout		3,054	32.5	+4.8
Liberal Democrats hold		Swing	–5.5	

Braunstone (1 seat)
Party	Candidate	Votes	%	±%
Labour	Amanda Hack	1,330	46.7	–14.4
Conservative	Les Phillimore	1,273	44.7	+5.8
UKIP	Rennee June Kent	241	8.5	N/A
Turnout		2,844	29.1	+3.1
Labour hold		Swing	–10.1	

Cosby and Countesthorpe (1 seat)
Party	Candidate	Votes	%	±%
Conservative	David Jennings	2,041	63.8	+8.3
Labour	Michael George Howkins	691	21.6	–5.6
Liberal Democrats	Beverley Jane Welsh	247	7.7	–9.6
UKIP	Adrian Clive Langley	216	6.8	N/A
Turnout		3,195	32.4	+3.3
Conservative hold		Swing	+7.0	

Enderby & Lubbesthorpe (1 seat)
Party	Candidate	Votes	%
Conservative	Helen Louise Richardson	1,140	55.9
Labour	Muhammad Shabbir Aslam	563	27.6
Liberal Democrats	Mark Edward Widdop	178	8.7
UKIP	Bill Piper	157	7.7
Turnout		2,038	26.7
Conservative win (new seat)			

Glenfields, Kirby Muxloe & Leicester Forests (2 seats)
Party	Candidate	Votes	%
Conservative	Lee Martin Breckon	3,158	62.4
Conservative	Richard Blunt	2,635	52.1
Labour	Dianne Patricia Esmond	801	15.8
UKIP	Lynton Ellis Yates	685	13.5
UKIP	Marc Wayne Preece	662	13.1
Labour	Thomas Eynon Legrys	640	12.6
Liberal Democrats	Kathryn Sansome	553	10.9
Green	Nick Cox	509	10.1
Liberal Democrats	Mark Jeremy Godfrey-Vallance	474	9.4
Turnout		10,117	28.8
Conservative win (new seat)			
Conservative win (new seat)			

Narborough & Whetstone (1 seat)
Party	Candidate	Votes	%	±%
Conservative	Terence John Richardson	1,800	65.9	+6.6
Labour	Michael Robert Bounds	717	26.2	+4.1
UKIP	Richard David Crouch	211	7.7	N/A
Turnout		2,728	26.1	+2.7
Conservative hold		Swing	+1.3	

Stoney Stanton & Croft (1 seat)
Party	Candidate	Votes	%
Conservative	Ernie White	2,137	73.2
Labour	Neil Stuart Hallam	507	17.3
Liberal Democrats	Christine Ann Merrill	275	9.4
Turnout		2,919	30.2
Conservative win (new seat)			

=== District of Charnwood ===
Birstall (1 seat)
Party	Candidate	Votes	%	±%
Conservative	Iain Ewart George Bentley	1,588	44.6	
Liberal Democrats	Simon Sansome	1,070	30.1	
Labour	Sanjay Prem Gogia	742	20.8	
UKIP	Simon Andrew Murray	154	4.3	
Turnout				
Conservative win (new seat)				

Bradgate (1 seat)
Party	Candidate	Votes	%	±%
Conservative	Deborah Taylor	2,346	68.1	
Labour	Glyn Stanley McAllister	492	14.2	
Liberal Democrats	Robert Simpson	287	8.3	
UKIP	Alan Spencer Jarvis	170	4.9	
Green	Katie Louise Walker	146	4.2	
Turnout				
Conservative win (new seat)				

Loughborough East (1 seat)
Party	Candidate	Votes	%	±%
Labour	Jewel Miah	1,530	61.7	
Conservative	Jane Marion Hunt	582	23.4	
UKIP	Christodoulos Peter Cooper	151	6.1	
Liberal Democrats	John Antony Elliot	113	4.6	
Green	Nigel James Feetham	101	4.1	
Turnout				
Labour win (new seat)				

Loughborough North (1 seat)
Party	Candidate	Votes	%	±%
Labour	Betty Newton	1,335	49.3	
Conservative	Salim Miah	947	34.9	
UKIP	Roger Howard Standing	187	6.9	
Green	Chris Hardisty	138	5.1	
Liberal Democrats	Philip Thornborow	99	3.7	
Turnout				
Labour win (new seat)				

Loughborough North West (1 seat)
Party	Candidate	Votes	%	±%
Labour	Max Hunt	1,118	48.7	
Conservative	Renata Catherine Eleanor Louise Jones	591	25.7	
Independent	Roy Campsall	372	16.2	
UKIP	Mary Elizabeth Jane Walker	92	4.0	
Liberal Democrats	David Vaughan Scott	66	2.9	
Green	John Paul Barton	53	2.3	
Turnout				
Labour win (new seat)				

Loughborough South (1 seat)
Party	Candidate	Votes	%	±%
Conservative	Ted Parton	1,329	48.0	
Labour	William Robert Sharp	1,107	40.0	
Liberal Democrats	Alex Guerrero	105	3.8	
Green	Caroline Harman	101	3.7	
UKIP	Frederick Roger Wakeford	93	3.4	
British Democrats	Kevan Christopher Stafford	30	1.1	
Turnout				
Conservative win (new seat)				

Loughborough South West (1 seat)
Party	Candidate	Votes	%	±%
Conservative	Jonathan Morgan	2,011	52.8	
Labour	Paul Emanuele Boldrin	907	23.8	
Liberal Democrats	David Robert Frank Walker	444	11.6	
Green	Paul Justin Goodman	244	6.4	
UKIP	Jim Foxall	202	5.3	
Turnout				
Conservative win (new seat)				

Quorn and Barrow (1 seat)
Party	Candidate	Votes	%	±%
Conservative	Hilary Jean Fryer	1,855	54.0	
Labour	Alice Brennan	757	22.0	
Liberal Democrats	Carolyn Julia Thornborow	396	11.5	
UKIP	Andy McWilliam	277	8.1	
Green	Ben Woolley	14	4.2	
Turnout				
Conservative win (new seat)				

Rothley and Mountsorrel (1 seat)
Party	Candidate	Votes	%	±%
Conservative	Peter Charles Osborne	1,735	63.6	
Labour	Julie May Palmer	450	16.5	
Liberal Democrats	Marianne Gilbert	305	11.1	
UKIP	Jamie Bye	236	8.7	
Turnout				
Conservative win (new seat)				

Shepshed (1 seat)
Party	Candidate	Votes	%	±%
Conservative	Christine Mary Radford	1,836	51.0	
Labour	Claire Marie Poole	1,095	30.4	
UKIP	Diane Jayne Horn	364	10.1	
Liberal Democrats	Donald Peter Cochrane	213	5.9	
Green	Mia Alexandra Woolley	87	2.4	
Turnout				
Conservative win (new seat)				

Sileby and the Wolds (1 seat)
Party	Candidate	Votes	%	±%
Conservative	Richard James Shepherd	1,786	59.4	
Labour	Valerie Susan Marriott	621	20.6	
Liberal Democrats	Nicky Ashby	280	9.3	
UKIP	Geoffrey Stanley	160	5.3	
Green	Billy Richards	159	5.3	
Turnout				
Conservative win (new seat)				

Syston Fosse (1 seat)
Party	Candidate	Votes	%	±%
Conservative	James Mark Poland	1,716	67.6	
Labour	Janet Knaggs	380	14.9	
UKIP	Gregory James Hubbard	188	7.4	
Green	Laurie Needham	132	5.2	
Liberal Democrats	Mat Martel	119	4.7	
Turnout				
Conservative win (new seat)				

Syston Ridgeway (1 seat)
Party	Candidate	Votes	%	±%
Conservative	David Paul Slater	1,266	57.6	
Labour	Michael Francis McLoughlin	457	20.8	
Green	Matthew Robert Wise	185	8.4	
UKIP	Martin William Brown	156	7.1	
Liberal Democrats	Ian Robert Sharpe	131	6.0	
Turnout				
Conservative win (new seat)				

Thurmaston Ridgemere (1 seat)
Party	Candidate	Votes	%	±%
Conservative	Brenda Seaton	1,271	54.0	
Labour	Kate Jane Knaggs	786	33.4	
UKIP	Ian Edward Hayes	159	6.8	
Liberal Democrats	Nitesh Pravin Dave	136	5.8	
Turnout				
Conservative win (new seat)				

=== District of Harborough ===
Broughton Astley (1 seat)
Party	Candidate	Votes	%	±%
Conservative	Bill Liquorish	1,893	69.9	
Labour	Sandra Parkinson	414	15.2	
Liberal Democrats	Colin Trevor Porter	399	14.7	
Turnout				
Conservative win (new seat)				

Bruntingthorpe (1 seat)
Party	Candidate	Votes	%	±%
Conservative	Blake Pain	2,460	67.9	
Liberal Democrats	Peter St. Quintin Bridge	605	16.7	
Labour	Liz Marsh	553	15.2	
Turnout				
Conservative win (new seat)				

Gartree (1 seat)
Party	Candidate	Votes	%	±%
Conservative	Kevin Feltham	2,354	67.5	
Labour	Ruth Commons	406	11.6	
Liberal Democrats	James Francis Lindsay	395	11.3	
Green	David Green	181	5.2	
UKIP	Brett Lynes	150	4.3	
Turnout				
Conservative win (new seat)				

Launde (1 seat)
Party	Candidate	Votes	%	±%
Liberal Democrats	Simon James Galton	2,265	56.0	
Conservative	Simon Christopher Whelband	1,369	33.8	
Labour	Paddy Casswell	204	5.1	
UKIP	Victor James Burbidge	120	3.0	
Green	Karon Christina Phillips	81	2.0	
Turnout				
Liberal Democrats win (new seat)				

Lutterworth (1 seat)
Party	Candidate	Votes	%	±%
Conservative	Rosita Page	2,138	62.7	
Liberal Democrats	Martin Sarfas	710	20.8	
Labour	David Robert Frazer Gair	561	16.4	
Turnout				
Conservative win (new seat)				

Market Harborough East (1 seat)
Party	Candidate	Votes	%	±%
Liberal Democrats	Sarah Hill	1,911	46.4	
Conservative	Phil King	1,662	40.4	
Labour	Andy Thomas	375	9.1	
Green	Jamie Ackerley	165	4.0	
Turnout				
Liberal Democrats win (new seat)				

Market Harborough West and Foxton (1 seat)
Party	Candidate	Votes	%	±%
Conservative	Paul Bremner	1,577	45.2	
Liberal Democrats	Peter James	1,265	36.2	
Labour	Ian Snaith	399	11.4	
Green	Darren Neil Woodiwiss	247	7.1	
Turnout				
Conservative win (new seat)				

=== District of Hinckley and Bosworth ===
Burbage (1 seat)
Party	Candidate	Votes	%	±%
Conservative	Amanda Victoria Wright	2,049	54.2	
Liberal Democrats	Keith William Philip Lynch	1,214	32.1	
Labour	Marie Jeanette Mills	345	9.1	
UKIP	Neale Lee Smith	167	4.4	
Turnout				
Conservative win (new seat)				

De Montfort (1 seat)
Party	Candidate	Votes	%	±%
Liberal Democrats	Michael Timothy Mullaney	2,002	52.8	
Conservative	Rosemary Wells Wright	1,488	39.2	
Labour	Roger Hill	299	7.9	
Turnout				
Liberal Democrats win (new seat)				

Earl Shilton (1 seat)
Party	Candidate	Votes	%	±%
Conservative	Janice Richards	1,644	59.4	
Labour	Christine Dallas	628	22.7	
Liberal Democrats	Mathew Scott Hulbert	266	9.6	
UKIP	Keith Cowen	226	8.2	
Turnout				
Conservative win (new seat)				

Groby and Ratby (1 seat)
Party	Candidate	Votes	%	±%
Conservative	Ozzy O'Shea	2,315	76.2	
Labour	David Arthur Hutchins	422	13.9	
Liberal Democrats	Muriel Joyce Crooks	173	5.7	
UKIP	Rahaul Paul Sharma	125	4.1	
Turnout				
Conservative win (new seat)				

Hollycroft (1 seat)
Party	Candidate	Votes	%	±%
Liberal Democrats	David C Bill	1,523	53.9	
Conservative	Christopher Andrew Ashton	838	29.7	
Labour	Chris Kealey	283	10.0	
UKIP	Chris Simpson	177	6.3	
Turnout				
Liberal Democrats win (new seat)				

Mallory (1 seat)
Party	Candidate	Votes	%	±%
Liberal Democrats	Bill Crooks	1,569	45.3	
Conservative	Ruth Camamile	1,189	34.3	
Labour	Rick Middleton	442	12.7	
UKIP	Mark Thomas Farmer	263	7.6	
Turnout				
Liberal Democrats win (new seat)				

Market Bosworth (1 seat)
Party	Candidate	Votes	%	±%
Conservative	Ivan Donald Ould	2,574	71.1	
Labour	Kate Anderton	456	12.5	
Liberal Democrats	Ann Clay	406	11.2	
UKIP	Alan Wood	184	5.1	
Turnout				
Conservative win (new seat)				

Markfield, Desford and Thornton (1 seat)
Party	Candidate	Votes	%	±%
Conservative	Peter Alexander Bedford	1,651	47.6	
UKIP	David Anthony Sprason	879	25.3	
Labour	Lesley Diane Neville	641	18.5	
Liberal Democrats	Robin Webber-Jones	292	8.4	
Turnout				
Conservative win (new seat)				

St Marys (1 seat)
Party	Candidate	Votes	%	±%
Liberal Democrats	Stuart Lee Bray	1,255	44.7	
Conservative	Mike Hall	935	33.3	
Labour	Christine Emmett	348	12.4	
UKIP	Elaine Louise Simpson	187	6.7	
Independent	Benn Gerald Leslie Moore	77	2.7	
Turnout				
Liberal Democrats win (new seat)				

=== District of Melton ===
Belvoir (1 seat)
Party	Candidate	Votes	%	±%
Conservative	Byron Rhodes	2,216	66.0	
Labour	Andre Wheeler	348	10.3	
Green	Colette Stein	300	8.9	
Liberal Democrats	Lily Kaufman	266	7.9	
UKIP	Graham Hall	224	6.7	
Turnout				
Conservative win (new seat)				

Melton East (1 seat)
Party	Candidate	Votes	%	±%
Conservative	Pam Posnett	2,079	64.2	
Labour	James Colin Ellis	455	14.0	
UKIP	John Frederick Charles Scutter	286	8.8	
Green	Alastair James McQuillan	242	7.5	
Liberal Democrats	Ian Keith Ridley	173	5.3	
Turnout				
Conservative win (new seat)				

Melton West (1 seat)
Party	Candidate	Votes	%	±%
Conservative	Alan Pearson	1,471	60.6	
Labour	Stef Blase	724	29.8	
Liberal Democrats	Sam Asplin	232	9.6	
Turnout				
Conservative win (new seat)				

Melton Wolds (1 seat)
Party	Candidate	Votes	%	±%
Conservative	Joe Orson	2,201	69.6	
Labour	Marion Elaine Smith	316	10.0	
Liberal Democrats	Ian Lauder	253	8.0	
Green	Woody Kitson	230	7.3	
UKIP	Joy Elaine Sharman	160	5.1	
Turnout				
Conservative win (new seat)				

=== North West Leicestershire ===
Ashby De La Zouch (1 seat)
Party	Candidate	Votes	%	±%
Conservative	John Geoffrey Coxon	1,658	53.8	
Labour	Doug Cooper	950	30.8	
Liberal Democrats	Vivienne Brooks	253	8.2	
UKIP	Simon Richard Aked	218	7.1	
Turnout				
Conservative win (new seat)				

Castle Donington and Kegworth (1 seat)
Party	Candidate	Votes	%	±%
Conservative	Trevor John Pendleton	1,528	57.4	
Labour	Michael David Hay	680	25.5	
UKIP	David Michael Outterside	232	8.7	
Liberal Democrats	Moira Lynch	218	8.2	
Turnout				
Conservative win (new seat)				

Coalville North (1 seat)
Party	Candidate	Votes	%	±%
Labour	Terri Eynon	1,158	41.1	
Conservative	Annette Bridges	816	28.9	
Liberal Democrats	Barry Wyatt	486	17.2	
UKIP	George Norley	288	10.2	
Independent	Graham Ronald Partner	66	2.3	
Turnout				
Labour win (new seat)				

Coalville South (1 seat)
Party	Candidate	Votes	%	±%
Liberal Democrats	Michael Barry Wyatt	1,153	38.4	
Conservative	John Cotterill	836	27.8	
Labour	Mark Burton	774	25.8	
UKIP	Mick Warren	237	7.9	
Turnout				
Liberal Democrats win (new seat)				

Forest and Measham (1 seat)
Party	Candidate	Votes	%	±%
Labour	Sean David Sheahan	1,125	44.5	
Conservative	Gill Hoult	1,087	43.0	
UKIP	Martin Lee Green	217	8.6	
Liberal Democrats	Aaron Windram	97	3.8	
Turnout				
Labour win (new seat)				

Ibstock and Appleby (1 seat)
Party	Candidate	Votes	%	±%
Conservative	Dan Harrison	1,500	52.5	
Labour	Mary Draycott	846	29.6	
UKIP	Val Pulford	302	10.5	
Liberal Democrats	Lee James Windram	207	7.3	
Turnout				
Conservative win (new seat)				

Valley (1 seat)
Party	Candidate	Votes	%	±%
Conservative	Nick Rushton	2,425	63.2	
Labour	Dominic McDevitt	677	17.6	
Liberal Democrats	Paul Andrew Tyler	429	11.1	
UKIP	Martin Peter Farrand	305	8.0	
Turnout				
Conservative win (new seat)				

Whitwick (1 seat)
Party	Candidate	Votes	%	±%
Conservative	Tony Gillard	1,805	54.1	
Labour	Dave Everitt	1,017	30.4	
UKIP	Tim Pulford	278	8.3	
Liberal Democrats	Maureen Wyatt	235	7.0	
Turnout				
Conservative win (new seat)				

=== District of Oadby and Wigston ===
East Wigston (1 seat)
Party	Candidate	Votes	%	±%
Liberal Democrats	Michael Henry Charlesworth	1,888	60.2	
Conservative	Rani Mahal	905	28.8	
Labour	Maureen Waugh	343	10.9	
Turnout				
Liberal Democrats win (new seat)				

North Wigston (1 seat)
Party	Candidate	Votes	%	±%
Liberal Democrats	Linda Margaret Broadley	1,506	51.6	
Conservative	Liz Darling	909	31.1	
Labour	Jen Williams	503	17.2	
Turnout				
Liberal Democrats win (new seat)				

Oadby (2 seats)
Party	Candidate	Votes	%	±%
Liberal Democrats	Dean Adam Gamble	2,718	44.8	
Liberal Democrats	Jeffrey Kaufmann	2,603	42.9	
Conservative	Bhupen Dave	1,912	31.5	
Conservative	Stephen Alexander Bilbie	1,782	29.4	
Labour	Gurpal Singh Atwal	1,230	20.3	
Labour	Camille Lesley Ievers Naylor	1,078	17.8	
UKIP	Mark James Hunt	318	5.2	
Turnout				
Liberal Democrats win (new seat)				

South and West Wigston (1 seat)
Party	Candidate	Votes	%	±%
Liberal Democrats	Bill Boulter	1,360	60.7	
Conservative	Anne Rosemary Bond	565	25.2	
Labour	Matthew William Luke	314	14.0	
Turnout				
Liberal Democrats win (new seat)				
