= County Hall, Glenfield =

County building in Glenfield, Leicestershire, England

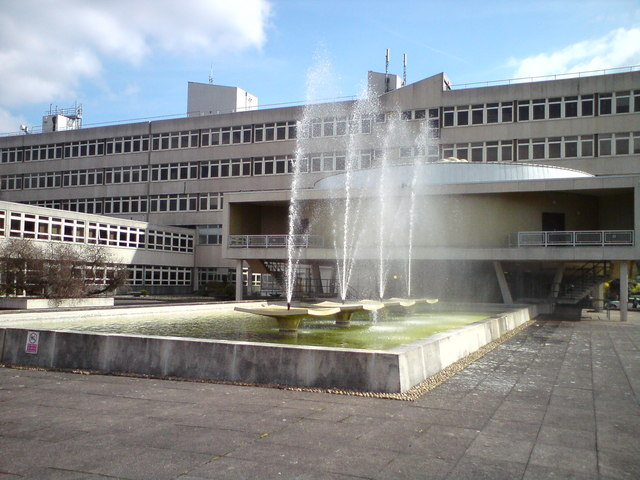
- County Hall

- Location within Leicestershire

General information
- Architectural style: Brutalist style
- Location: Leicester Road, Glenfield, Leicestershire, United Kingdom
- Coordinates: 52.6552°N 1.1892°W
- Completed: November 1967

Design and construction
- Architect: In-house architectural team

County Hall is a municipal building on Leicester Road (the A50) in Glenfield, Leicestershire. It is the headquarters of Leicestershire County Council.

== History ==
In the first half of the 20th century, meetings of Leicestershire County Council were held at the Assembly Rooms in Hotel Street, Leicester, while County Offices were established at No.1 Grey Friars in Leicester in 1936. After deciding that this arrangement was inadequate for their needs, county leaders chose to procure a new county headquarters: the site they selected at Glenfield had previously been open land which they considered was a more economical solution than a city centre site.

Construction on the new building began in spring 1965. It was designed by the in-house architectural team in the Brutalist style, was built at a cost of £1.4 million and was completed in November 1967. The design for the five-storey building involved continuous bands of glazing with concrete panelling above and below: a concrete mural depicting the River Soar by Tony Hollaway was unveiled at that time. An extension to accommodate a computer suite opened in 1970, and the Rutland Building extension was completed in 1974. The principal room was the council chamber which was panelled with Japanese teak and Bombay rosewood.

Queen Elizabeth II made an official visit to County Hall during a tour of Leicestershire, on 17 November 1989. A memorial to commemorate local people from the county who had died since the Second World War was unveiled on 9 November 2012: the memorial, entitled "Stand Easy", was designed by Kenny Hunter from Glasgow and comprised four bronze statues which were modelled on soldiers from Welbeck Defence Sixth Form College.

Works of art in the building include a painting by John Ferneley depicting the Melton Mowbray Horse Fair. The building also contains a large collection of modern art collected by a former director of education, Stewart C. Mason.

The Lord-Lieutenant's Young Person of the Year Awards are held annually at County Hall.
