= 2021 Leicestershire County Council election =

2021 UK local government election

- 6 May 2021

All 55 seats to Leicestershire County Council 28 seats needed for a majority
	First party	Second party	Third party
Party	Conservative	Liberal Democrats	Labour
Seats before	36	13	6
Seats won	42	9	4
Seat change	▲6	▼4	▼2
Popular vote	97,318	35,481	38,220
Percentage	51.8%	18.9%	20.3%
Swing	▲1.0%	▼2.3%	▼0.3%
- Map showing the results of the 2021 Leicestershire County Council elections.
Council control before election
Conservative
Council control after election
Conservative

The 2021 Leicestershire County Council election took place alongside the other local elections. All councilors were elected from electoral divisions by first-past-the-post voting for a four-year term of office.

== Results ==
=== Overview ===
2021 Leicestershire County Council election
Party	Candidates	Seats	Gains	Losses	Net gain/loss	Seats %	Votes %	Votes	+/−
Conservative	55	42	6	0	▲6	76.4	51.8	97,318	+1.0
Liberal Democrats	52	9	0	4	▼4	16.4	18.9	35,481	–2.3
Labour	54	4	0	2	▼2	7.3	20.3	38,220	–0.3
Green	47	0	0	0	Steady	0.0	8.3	15,651	+6.3
Reform	11	0	0	0	Steady	0.0	0.4	793	N/A
Freedom Alliance (UK)	4	0	0	0	Steady	0.0	0.1	187	N/A
For Britain	2	0	0	0	Steady	0.0	0.1	164	N/A
SDP	2	0	0	0	Steady	0.0	<0.1	47	N/A
TUSC	1	0	0	0	Steady	0.0	<0.1	41	N/A

== Results by Division ==
=== Blaby ===
Blaby district summary
Party	Seats	+/-	Votes	%	+/-
Conservative	6	Steady	15,245	56.1	+1.5
Labour	1	Steady	4,917	18.1	–2.6
Liberal Democrats	1	Steady	3,736	13.8	+1.0
Green	0	Steady	3,086	11.4	N/A
Independent	0	Steady	181	0.7	N/A
Total	8	Steady	27,165		

Division results

Blaby and Glen Parva
Party	Candidate	Votes	%	±%
Liberal Democrats	Geoff Welsh	1,484	48.7	−7.8
Conservative	Ryan Scott	1,020	33.5	+3.9
Labour	Suresh Chauhan	304	10.0	+0.2
Green	Rob Clarke	235	7.7	N/A
Majority				
Liberal Democrats hold		Swing		

Braunstone
Party	Candidate	Votes	%	±%
Labour	Amanda Hack	1,271	44.7	−2.0
Conservative	Nigel Grundy	1,142	40.1	−4.6
Independent	David Di Palma	181	6.4	N/A
Green	Mary Kapadia	174	6.1	N/A
Liberal Democrats	Chris Merrill	73	2.6	N/A
Majority				
Labour hold		Swing		

Cosby and Countesthorpe
Party	Candidate	Votes	%	±%
Conservative	Les Phillimore	1,962	58.4	−5.4
Green	Will Read	434	12.9	N/A
Liberal Democrats	Paul Hartshorn	506	15.0	7.3
Labour	Zachary Atkins	455	13.5	−8.1
Majority				
Conservative hold		Swing		

Enderby and Lubbesthorpe
Party	Candidate	Votes	%	±%
Conservative	Helen Richardson	1,206	55.3	−0.6
Labour	Lisa Pendery-Hunt	639	29.3	1.7
Green	Steven Travis	214	9.8	N/A
Liberal Democrats	Bev Welsh	121	5.6	−3.2
Majority				
Conservative hold		Swing		

Glenfields, Kirby Muxloe and Leicester Forests
Party	Candidate	Votes	%	±%
Conservative	Lee Breckon	2,839	64.0	+1.6
Conservative	Nick Chapman	2,827	63.7	+11.6
Labour	Malcolm Fox	1,153	26.0	+10.2
Green	Tony Deakin	734	16.5	+6.4
Green	Bettina Atkinson	596	13.4	N/A
Liberal Democrats	Helen Gambardella	495	11.2	+0.3
Liberal Democrats	Mat Mortel	285	6.4	−3.0
Majority				
Conservative hold		Swing		
Conservative hold		Swing		

Narborough and Whetstone
Party	Candidate	Votes	%	±%
Conservative	Terry Richardson	1,755	61.2	−4.7
Labour	Steve Cooper	602	21.0	−5.2
Green	Mike Jelfs	348	12.1	N/A
Liberal Democrats	Antony Moseley	161	5.6	N/A
Majority				
Conservative hold		Swing		

Stoney Stanton and Croft
Party	Candidate	Votes	%	±%
Conservative	Maggie Wright	2,494	63.1	−10.1
Liberal Democrats	Luke Cousin	611	15.4	+6.0
Labour	Steve Crane	493	12.4	−4.9
Green	Nick Cox	351	8.88	N/A
Majority				
Conservative hold		Swing		

=== Charnwood ===
Charnwood district summary
Party	Seats	+/-	Votes	%	+/-
Conservative	11	Steady	22,241	51.8	+0.6
Labour	3	Steady	12,577	29.3	+0.4
Green	0	Steady	4,961	11.6	+8.2
Liberal Democrats	0	Steady	2,761	6.4	–2.8
Reform UK	0	Steady	333	0.8	N/A
TUSC	0	Steady	41	0.1	N/A
For Britain	0	Steady	37	0.1	N/A
Total	14	Steady	42,951		

Division results

Birstall
Party	Candidate	Votes	%	±%
Conservative	Daniel Grimley	1,703	49.2	+4.6
Labour	Julie Palmer	1,224	35.3	+14.5
Liberal Democrats	Rob Hewson	531	15.3	−14.8
Majority				
Conservative hold		Swing		

Bradgate
Party	Candidate	Votes	%	±%
Conservative	Deborah Taylor	2,486	66.5	−1.6
Labour	Dave Berry	631	16.8	+2.6
Green	Philip Mills	401	10.7	+6.5
Liberal Democrats	Kate Tipton	220	5.9	−2.4
Majority				
Conservative hold		Swing		

Loughborough East
Party	Candidate	Votes	%	±%
Labour	Jewel Miah	1,477	58.3	−3.4
Conservative	Judy Shields	628	24.8	+1.4
Green	David Kellock	246	9.7	+5.6
Liberal Democrats	Emmanuel Fantaisie	93	3.7	−0.9
Reform	Chris Cooper	86	3.4	N/A
Majority				
Labour hold		Swing		

Loughborough North
Party	Candidate	Votes	%	±%
Labour	Betty Newton	1,138	44.1	−5.2
Conservative	Julie Mather	1,122	43.5	+8.6
Green	Wesley Walton	214	8.3	+3.2
Liberal Democrats	Philip Thornborow	103	4.0	+0.3
Majority				
Labour hold		Swing		

Loughborough North West
Party	Candidate	Votes	%	±%
Labour	Max Hunt	1,187	50.9	+2.2
Conservative	Pauline Ranson	846	36.3	+10.6
Green	Nigel Feetham	151	6.5	+4.2
Liberal Democrats	Jim Adcock	103	4.4	+1.5
TUSC	Damian Cosgrove	41	1.8	N/A
Majority				
Labour hold		Swing		

Loughborough South
Party	Candidate	Votes	%	±%
Conservative	Ted Parton	1,318	48.1	+0.1
Labour	Gill Bolton	1,083	39.5	−0.5
Green	Naomi Bottomley	234	8.5	+4.8
Liberal Democrats	Alex Guerrero	105	3.8	0.0
Majority				
Conservative hold		Swing		

Loughborough South West
Party	Candidate	Votes	%	±%
Conservative	Jonathan Morgan	1,850	45.4	−7.4
Labour	Rowan Myall	987	24.2	+0.4
Liberal Democrats	Aidan Reed	757	18.6	+7.0
Green	Paul Goodman	369	9.1	+2.7
Reform	Jim Foxall	104	2.6	N/A
Majority				
Conservative hold		Swing		

Quorn and Barrow
Party	Candidate	Votes	%	±%
Conservative	Hilary Fryer	1,952	54.7	+0.7
Labour	Josh Clayton	1,000	28.0	+6.0
Green	Mia Woolley	373	10.4	+6.2
Liberal Democrats	Carolyn Thornborow	158	4.4	−7.1
Reform	Andy McWilliam	82	2.3	N/A
Majority				
Conservative hold		Swing		

Rothley and Mountsorrel
Party	Candidate	Votes	%	±%
Conservative	Leon Hadji-Nikolaou	1,804	56.0	−7.6
Labour	Liz Blackshaw	1,072	33.2	+16.7
Green	Michelle Nelson	203	6.3	N/A
Liberal Democrats	Alistair Duffy	141	4.4	−6.7
Majority				
Conservative hold		Swing		

Shepshed
Party	Candidate	Votes	%	±%
Conservative	Christine Radford	2,051	60.0	+9.0
Labour	Jane Lennie	946	27.7	−2.7
Green	John Hounsome	239	7.0	+4.6
Liberal Democrats	Katy Brookes-Duncan	177	5.2	−0.7
Majority				
Conservative hold		Swing		

Sileby and the Wolds
Party	Candidate	Votes	%	±%
Conservative	Richard Shepherd	1,722	57.2	−2.2
Labour	Andrew Seggie	618	20.5	−0.1
Green	Billy Richards	382	12.7	+7.4
Liberal Democrats	Ian Sharpe	187	6.2	−3.1
For Britain	George Addinall	37	1.2	N/A
Reform	Pete Morris	61	2.0	N/A
Majority				
Conservative hold		Swing		

Syston Fosse
Party	Candidate	Votes	%	±%
Conservative	James Poland	1,820	59.5	−8.1
Green	Laurie Needham	980	32.0	+26.8
Labour	Samanta Zubrute	256	8.4	−6.5
Majority				
Conservative hold		Swing		

Syston Ridgeway
Party	Candidate	Votes	%	±%
Conservative	Tom Barkley	1,291	47.4	−10.2
Green	Louisa Wait	1169	42.9	+34.5
Labour	Lyndsey Derbyshire	259	9.5	−11.3
Majority				
Conservative hold		Swing		

Thurmaston Ridgemere
Party	Candidate	Votes	%	±%
Conservative	Brenda Seaton	1,648	65.0	+11.0
Labour	Abe Khayer	699	27.5	−5.9
Liberal Democrats	Nitesh Dave	186	7.3	+1.5
Majority				
Conservative hold		Swing		

=== Harborough ===
Harborough district summary
Party	Seats	+/-	Votes	%	+/-
Conservative	6	▲1	14,039	50.9	–3.2
Liberal Democrats	1	▼1	7,378	26.8	–3.6
Labour	0	Steady	3,693	13.4	+1.7
Green	0	Steady	2,462	8.9	+6.2
Total	7	Steady	27,572		

Division results

Broughton Astley
Party	Candidate	Votes	%	±%
Conservative	Neil Bannister	1,589	52.8	−17.1
Liberal Democrats	Mark Graves	969	32.2	+17.5
Labour	Christina Emmett	239	7.9	−7.3
Green	Mark Green	210	7.0	N/A
Majority				
Conservative hold		Swing		

Bruntingthorpe
Party	Candidate	Votes	%	±%
Conservative	Blake Pain	2,478	59.8	−8.1
Liberal Democrats	Stephen Walkley	747	18.0	+1.3
Labour	David Gair	545	13.1	−2.1
Green	Mary Smith	371	9.0	N/A
Majority				
Conservative hold		Swing		

Gartree
Party	Candidate	Votes	%	±%
Conservative	Kevin Feltham	2,357	62.1	−5.4
Liberal Democrats	Trish Formoy	537	14.1	+2.8
Labour	Aime Armstrong	510	13.4	+1.8
Green	Gillian Buswell	388	10.2	+5.0
Majority				
Conservative hold		Swing		

Launde
Party	Candidate	Votes	%	±%
Liberal Democrats	Simon Galton	1,986	45.1	−10.9
Conservative	Michael Rickman	1,796	40.8	+7.0
Labour	Matt Smith	392	8.9	+3.8
Green	Melanie Walkley	222	5.1	+3.1
Majority		190	4.3%	−17.9%
Liberal Democrats hold		Swing	-8.95%	

Lutterworth
Party	Candidate	Votes	%	±%
Conservative	Rosita Page	2,170	55.7	−7.0
Labour	Paul Beadle	941	24.1	+7.7
Liberal Democrats	Martin Sarfas	489	12.5	−8.3
Green	Carl Tiivas	294	7.6	N/A
Majority				
Conservative hold		Swing		

Market Harborough East
Party	Candidate	Votes	%	±%
Conservative	Barry Champion	1,887	42.1	+1.7
Liberal Democrats	Sarah Hill	1,712	38.2	−8.2
Labour	Maria Panter	506	11.3	+2.2
Green	Mary Morgan	371	8.3	+4.3
Majority				
Conservative gain from Liberal Democrats		Swing		

Market Harborough West and Foxton
Party	Candidate	Votes	%	±%
Conservative	Phil King	1,762	45.5	+0.3
Liberal Democrats	Peter James	938	24.2	−12.0
Green	Darren Woodiwiss	606	15.6	+8.5
Labour	Anne Pridmore	560	14.4	+3.0
Majority				
Conservative hold		Swing		

=== Hinckley and Bosworth ===
Hinckley & Bosworth district summary
Party	Seats	+/-	Votes	%	+/-
Conservative	6	▲1	15,427	51.3	+1.6
Liberal Democrats	3	▼1	9,793	32.6	+3.1
Labour	0	Steady	3,836	12.8	–0.3
Green	0	Steady	816	2.7	N/A
Reform UK	0	Steady	137	0.5	N/A
SDP	0	Steady	47	0.2	N/A
Total	9	Steady	30,056		

Division results

Burbage
Party	Candidate	Votes	%	±%
Conservative	Amanda Wright	1,963	48.3	−5.8
Liberal Democrats	Barry Walker	1.693	41.7	+9.6
Labour	Robert Martin	372	9.2	+0.1
SDP	Roger Hill	29	0.7	N/A
Majority				
Conservative hold		Swing		

De Montfort
Party	Candidate	Votes	%	±%
Liberal Democrats	Michael Mullaney	1,957	55.7	+2.9
Conservative	Jan Kirby	1,303	37.1	−2.1
Labour	Heather White	252	7.2	−0.7
Majority				
Liberal Democrats hold		Swing		

Earl Shilton
Party	Candidate	Votes	%	±%
Conservative	Richard Allen	1,762	61.7	+2.3
Labour	Rick Middleton	553	19.3	−3.4
Liberal Democrats	Sandra Francks	290	10.1	+0.5
Green	Lewis Orton	153	5.4	N/A
Reform	Peter Cheshire	94	3.3	N/A
Majority				
Conservative hold		Swing		

Groby and Ratby
Party	Candidate	Votes	%	±%
Conservative	Ozzy O'Shea	2,396	75.4	−0.8
Labour	Rebecca Pawley	357	11.2	−2.7
Liberal Democrats	Ted Hollick	280	8.8	+3.1
Green	Mark Wren	144	4.5	N/A
Majority				
Conservative hold		Swing		

Hollycroft
Party	Candidate	Votes	%	±%
Liberal Democrats	David Bill	1,592	57.1	+3.2
Conservative	Russ Roberts	906	32.5	+2.8
Labour	Andre Wheeler	288	10.3	+0.3
Majority				
Liberal Democrats hold		Swing		

Mallory
Party	Candidate	Votes	%	±%
Conservative	Ross Hills	1,536	46.4	+12.1
Liberal Democrats	Mark Sheppard-Bools	1,468	44.4	−0.9
Labour	Jim Buck	302	9.1	−3.6
Majority				
Conservative gain from Liberal Democrats		Swing		

Market Bosworth
Party	Candidate	Votes	%	±%
Conservative	Bertie Harrison-Rushton	2,541	66.8	−4.3
Liberal Democrats	Muriel Crooks	521	13.7	+2.6
Labour	Kevin Ennis	399	10.5	−2.0
Green	Alec Duthie	344	9.0	N/A
Majority				
Conservative hold		Swing		

Markfield, Desford and Thornton
Party	Candidate	Votes	%	±%
Conservative	Peter Bedford	2,091	54.0	+6.4
Labour	Andy Furlong	951	24.5	+6.0
Liberal Democrats	Robin Webber-Jones	608	15.7	+7.3
Green	Matthew Thorogood	175	4.5	N/A
Reform	Bill Piper	43	1.1	N/A
Majority				
Conservative hold		Swing		

St Marys
Party	Candidate	Votes	%	±%
Liberal Democrats	Stuart Bray	1,384	51.3	+6.6
Conservative	Tom Lee	930	34.5	+1.2
Labour	Rosie Lythgoe-Cheetham	362	13.4	+1.0
SDP	Paul Forrest	18	0.7	N/A
Majority				
Liberal Democrats hold		Swing		

=== Melton ===
Melton district summary
Party	Seats	+/-	Votes	%	+/-
Conservative	4	Steady	8,197	60.5	–4.9
Labour	0	Steady	2,415	17.8	+2.7
Green	0	Steady	1,055	7.8	+1.5
Independent	0	Steady	991	7.3	N/A
Liberal Democrats	0	Steady	809	6.0	–1.6
Reform UK	0	Steady	72	0.5	N/A
Total	4	Steady	13,539		

Division results

Belvoir
Party	Candidate	Votes	%	±%
Conservative	Bryan Lovegrove	2,530	67.7	+1.7
Labour	Helen Cliff	535	14.3	+4.0
Green	Colette Stein	412	11.0	+2.1
Liberal Democrats	Sue Taylor	259	6.9	−1.0
Majority				
Conservative hold		Swing		

Melton East
Party	Candidate	Votes	%	±%
Conservative	Pam Posnett	1,826	54.0	−10.2
Labour	Tim Litt	800	23.6	+9.6
Independent	Simon Lumley	332	9.8	N/A
Green	Martyn Gower	246	7.3	−0.2
Liberal Democrats	Carol Weaver	103	3.0	−2.3
Reform	Marcus Wilson	72	2.1	
Majority				
Conservative hold		Swing		

Melton West
Party	Candidate	Votes	%	±%
Conservative	Mark Frisby	1,425	53.3	−7.3
Labour	Pip Allnatt	620	23.2	−6.6
Green	Alastair McQuillan	397	14.8	N/A
Independent	Marilyn Gordon	229	8.6	−1.0
Majority				
Conservative hold		Swing		

Melton Wolds
Party	Candidate	Votes	%	±%
Conservative	Joe Orson	2,416	64.3	−5.3
Labour	Carol Hopkinson	460	12.2	+2.2
Liberal Democrats	Hamish McAuley	447	11.9	+3.9
Independent	Steven Carter	430	11.4	N/A
Majority				
Conservative hold		Swing		

=== North West Leicestershire ===
North West Leicestershire district summary
Party	Seats	+/-	Votes	%	+/-
Conservative	8	▲3	14,201	50.5	+2.1
Labour	0	▼2	8,060	28.6	–1.4
Liberal Democrats	0	▼1	2,560	9.1	–3.7
Green	0	Steady	2,165	7.7	N/A
Independent	0	Steady	565	2.0	+1.7
Freedom Alliance	0	Steady	276	1.0	N/A
Reform UK	0	Steady	190	0.7	N/A
For Britain	0	Steady	127	0.5	N/A
Total	8	Steady	28,114		

Division results

Ashby de la Zouch
Party	Candidate	Votes	%	±%
Conservative	John Coxon	1,964	49.5	−4.3
Labour	Debra Jackson	1,190	30.0	−0.8
Green	Carl Benfield	508	12.8	N/A
Liberal Democrats	Sheila Wyatt	168	4.2	−4.0
Freedom Alliance	Claire O'Callaghan	89	2.2	N/A
Reform	Adam Tilbury	46	1.2	N/A
Majority				
Conservative hold		Swing		

Castle Donington and Kegworth
Party	Candidate	Votes	%	±%
Conservative	Trevor Pendleton	1,537	46.6	−10.8
Labour	Michael Hay	849	25.7	+0.2
Independent	Tony Saffell	565	17.1	N/A
Green	Lucy Pratt	232	7.0	N/A
Liberal Democrats	Moira Lynch	111	3.4	−4.8
Majority				
Conservative hold		Swing		

Coalville North
Party	Candidate	Votes	%	±%
Conservative	Craig Smith	1,357	42.8	+13.9
Labour	Terri Eynon	1,069	33.7	−7.4
Liberal Democrats	Marie French	480	15.1	−2.1
Green	David Robinson	132	4.2	N/A
For Britain	Graham Partner	127	4.0	+1.7
Majority				
Conservative gain from Labour		Swing		

Coalville South
Party	Candidate	Votes	%	±%
Conservative	Keith Merrie	1,584	43.2	+15.4
Liberal Democrats	Michael Wyatt	1,144	31.2	−7.2
Labour	Charlotte le Grys	688	18.7	−7.1
Green	Mark Burns	202	5.5	N/A
Freedom Alliance	Sadie Cubitt	47	1.3	N/A
Majority				
Conservative gain from Liberal Democrats		Swing		

Forest and Measham
Party	Candidate	Votes	%	±%
Conservative	Robert Ashman	1,620	52.8	+9.8
Labour	Sean Sheahan	1,114	36.3	−8.2
Green	James Harrison	200	6.5	N/A
Liberal Democrats	Yorick Lynch	69	2.3	−1.5
Reform	Mick Gee	62	2.0	N/A
Majority				
Conservative gain from Labour		Swing		

Ibstock and Appleby
Party	Candidate	Votes	%	±%
Conservative	Dan Harrison	1,925	56.4	+3.9
Labour	Carissma Griffiths	1,010	29.6	0.0
Liberal Democrats	David Wyatt	273	8.0	+0.7
Green	Ian Wilson	202	5.9	N/A
Majority				
Conservative hold		Swing		

Valley
Party	Candidate	Votes	%	±%
Conservative	Nick Rushton	1,964	49.5	−13.7
Labour	Gregory Parle	1,190	30.0	+12.4
Green	Ben Woolley	508	12.8	N/A
Liberal Democrats	Paul Tyler	168	4.2	−6.9
Freedom Alliance	Claire Louise O'Callaghan	89	2.2	N/A
Reform	Gareth Bott	46	1.2	N/A
Majority				
Conservative hold		Swing		

Whitwick
Party	Candidate	Votes	%	±%
Conservative	Tony Gillard	2,250	62.2	+8.1
Labour	Dave Everitt	950	26.2	−4.2
Green	Liz Fletcher	181	5.0	N/A
Liberal Democrats	Jake Windram	147	4.1	−2.9
Freedom Alliance	Sophie Cruse	51	1.4	N/A
Reform	David Gunn	36	1.0	N/A
Majority				
Conservative hold		Swing		

=== Oadby and Wigston ===
Oadby & Wigston district summary
Party	Seats	+/-	Votes	%	+/-
Liberal Democrats	4	▼1	8,306	41.7	–8.8
Conservative	1	▲1	7,288	36.6	+6.1
Labour	0	Steady	3,147	15.8	–1.6
Green	0	Steady	1,157	5.8	N/A
Total	5	Steady	19,898		

Division results

East Wigston
Party	Candidate	Votes	%	±%
Liberal Democrats	Michael Charlesworth	1,390	44.8	−15.4
Conservative	Liz Darling	1,292	41.6	+12.8
Labour	Rob Brannen	279	9.0	−1.9
Green	Christopher Cooper-Hayes	141	4.5	N/A
Majority				
Liberal Democrats hold		Swing		

North Wigston
Party	Candidate	Votes	%	±%
Liberal Democrats	Linda Broadley	1,264	44.4	−7.2
Conservative	Mukesh Davé	852	29.9	−1.2
Labour	Richard Keenan	548	19.2	+2.0
Green	Richard Ansell	182	6.4	N/A
Majority				
Liberal Democrats hold		Swing		

Oadby
Party	Candidate	Votes	%	±%
Liberal Democrats	Dean Gamble	2,338	39.6	−5.2
Conservative	Kamal Ghattoraya	2,274	38.6	+7.1
Liberal Democrats	Jeffrey Kaufman	2,249	38.1	−4.8
Conservative	Priti Joshi	2,242	38.0	+8.6
Labour	Hajira Piranie	1,004	17.0	−3.3
Labour	Helen Morrison	998	16.9	−0.9
Green	Bethan Painter	439	7.4	N/A
Green	Sakile Simpson	290	4.9	N/A
Majority				
Liberal Democrats hold		Swing		
Conservative gain from Liberal Democrats		Swing		

South and West Wigston
Party	Candidate	Votes	%	±%
Liberal Democrats	Bill Boulter	1,065	50.3	−10.4
Conservative	Oliver Bryan	628	29.6	+4.4
Labour	Steve Maggs	318	15.0	+1.0
Green	Mandy Sanders	105	4.96	N/A
Majority				
Liberal Democrats hold		Swing		

== By-elections ==
=== Blaby & Glen Parva ===
Blaby & Glen Parva: 21 December 2023
Party	Candidate	Votes	%	±%
Liberal Democrats	Sue Jordan	989	61.2	+12.5
Conservative	Nigel Grundy	320	19.8	−13.7
Labour	Laura Badland	190	11.8	+1.8
Green	Mike Jelfs	116	7.2	−0.5
Majority		669	41.4	+26.2
Turnout		1,615	17.0	−15.1
Registered electors		9,530		
Liberal Democrats hold		Swing	+13.1	

=== Burbage ===
Burbage: 2 May 2024
Party	Candidate	Votes	%	±%
Liberal Democrats	Barry Walker	1,496	51.3	+9.6
Conservative	Maddie Lee	880	30.2	−18.1
Labour	James Ross	401	13.8	+4.6
Green	Rhiannon Carter	138	4.7	+4.7
Majority		616	21.1	
Turnout		2888	29.7	
Registered electors		9,899		
Liberal Democrats gain from Conservative		Swing	+13.8	
