= Leicestershire County Council =

British administrative authority

- Council logo

Type
- Type: Non-metropolitan county

History
- Founded: 1 April 1889

Leadership
- Chairman: Linda Danks, Reform UK since 13 May 2026
- Leader: Kevin Crook (Acting), Reform UK since 2 November 2026
- Chief Executive: Jane Moore since December 2025

Structure
- Seats: 55 councillors
- Graph of the party split among 55 seats.
- Political groups: Administration (23) Reform (23) Other parties (32) Conservative (15) Liberal Democrats (11) Labour (3) Green (1) Restore (1) Independent (1)
- Length of term: 4 years

Elections
- Voting system: First-past-the-post
- Last election: 1 May 2025
- Next election: 2029

Meeting place
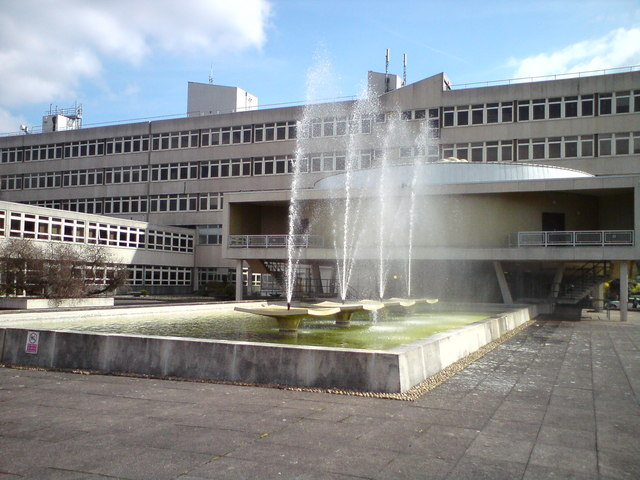
- County Hall, Leicester Road, Glenfield, Leicester, LE3 8RA

Website
- www.leicestershire.gov.uk

Leicestershire County Council is the upper-tier local authority for the non-metropolitan county of Leicestershire, England. The non-metropolitan county is smaller than the ceremonial county, which additionally includes Leicester. The county council was originally formed in 1889 by the Local Government Act 1888. The county is divided into 53 electoral divisions, which return a total of 55 councillors. The council is based at County Hall at Glenfield, just outside the city of Leicester in Blaby district. The county council has been under no overall control since the 2025 election, being run by a Reform UK minority administration.

== History ==
Elected county councils were created in 1889 under the Local Government Act 1888, taking over administrative functions which had previously been performed by unelected magistrates at the quarter sessions. The borough of Leicester was considered large enough for its existing borough council to provide county-level services, and so it was made a county borough, independent from the county council. The 1888 Act also directed that urban sanitary districts which straddled county boundaries were to be placed entirely in one county, which saw Leicestershire gain part of Market Harborough from Northamptonshire and part of Hinckley from Warwickshire. Leicestershire County Council was elected by and provided services to the parts of the county (as thus adjusted) outside the county borough of Leicester. The county council's area was termed the administrative county.

The first elections were held in January 1889, and the council formally came into being on 1 April 1889, on which day it held its first official meeting at Leicester Town Hall. Henry St John Halford was appointed the first chairman of the council.

In 1974, the Local Government Act 1972 reconstituted Leicestershire as a non-metropolitan county, adding the former county borough of Leicester, and the small county of Rutland to the area. The lower tier of local government was reorganised as part of the same reforms. Previously it had comprised numerous boroughs, urban districts and rural districts; they were reorganised into nine non-metropolitan districts, including Leicester and Rutland. In 1997 Leicester and Rutland were removed from the county council's area again, to become unitary authorities.

== Reorganisation ==
In July 2026, the UK Government announced that it intended to reorganise local government in Leicestershire by April 2029. The existing county and district councils would be abolished, and two unitary authority areas would cover the county. One would include Leicester and its hinterland, an area larger than the current Leicester district, and other would cover the remainder of the county, named Leicestershire and Rutland which will also cover Rutland.

In September 2026, the process was paused nationally and put under "rapid review" without a published timetable.

== Governance ==
Leicestershire County Council provides county-level services. District-level services are provided by the area's seven district councils. Much of the county is also covered by civil parishes, which form a third tier of local government. The seven district councils are:

- Blaby District Council
- Charnwood Borough Council
- Harborough District Council
- Hinckley and Bosworth Borough Council
- Melton Borough Council
- North West Leicestershire District Council
- Oadby and Wigston Borough Council

=== Political control ===
The council has been under no overall control since the 2025 elections. Reform UK won most seats at that election, although were three seats short of having an overall majority. They subsequently formed a minority administration, taking all the seats on the council's cabinet. Political control of the council since the 1974 reforms has been as follows:

Party in control	Years
No overall control	1974–1977
Conservative	1977–1981
No overall control	1981–2001
Conservative	2001–2025
No overall control	2025–present

=== Leadership ===
The leaders of the council since 1999 have been:

Councillor	Party	From	To
Harry Barber	Conservative	1999	21 May 2003
David Parsons	Conservative	21 May 2003	3 Jul 2012
Nick Rushton (Note: From July 2024 to May 2025 Nick Rushton remained nominally leader, but deputy leader Deborah Taylor was serving as acting leader while Rushton was undergoing medical treatment.)	Conservative	26 Sep 2012	May 2025
Dan Harrison	Reform	14 May 2025	2 Nov 2026

=== Composition ===
Following the 2025 election, and subsequent changes up to September 2026, the composition of the council was as follows:

Party	Seats
Reform	23
Conservative	15
Liberal Democrats	11
Labour	2
Green	1
Restore	1
Independent	1
Vacant	1
Total	55

=== Elections ===
Since the last boundary changes in 2019 the council has comprised 55 councillors representing 53 electoral divisions. Most divisions elect one councillor, but two divisions elect two councillors. Elections are held every four years.

=== Premises ===
The council is based at County Hall in Glenfield, on the outskirts of Leicester but just outside the city boundary in the Blaby district.

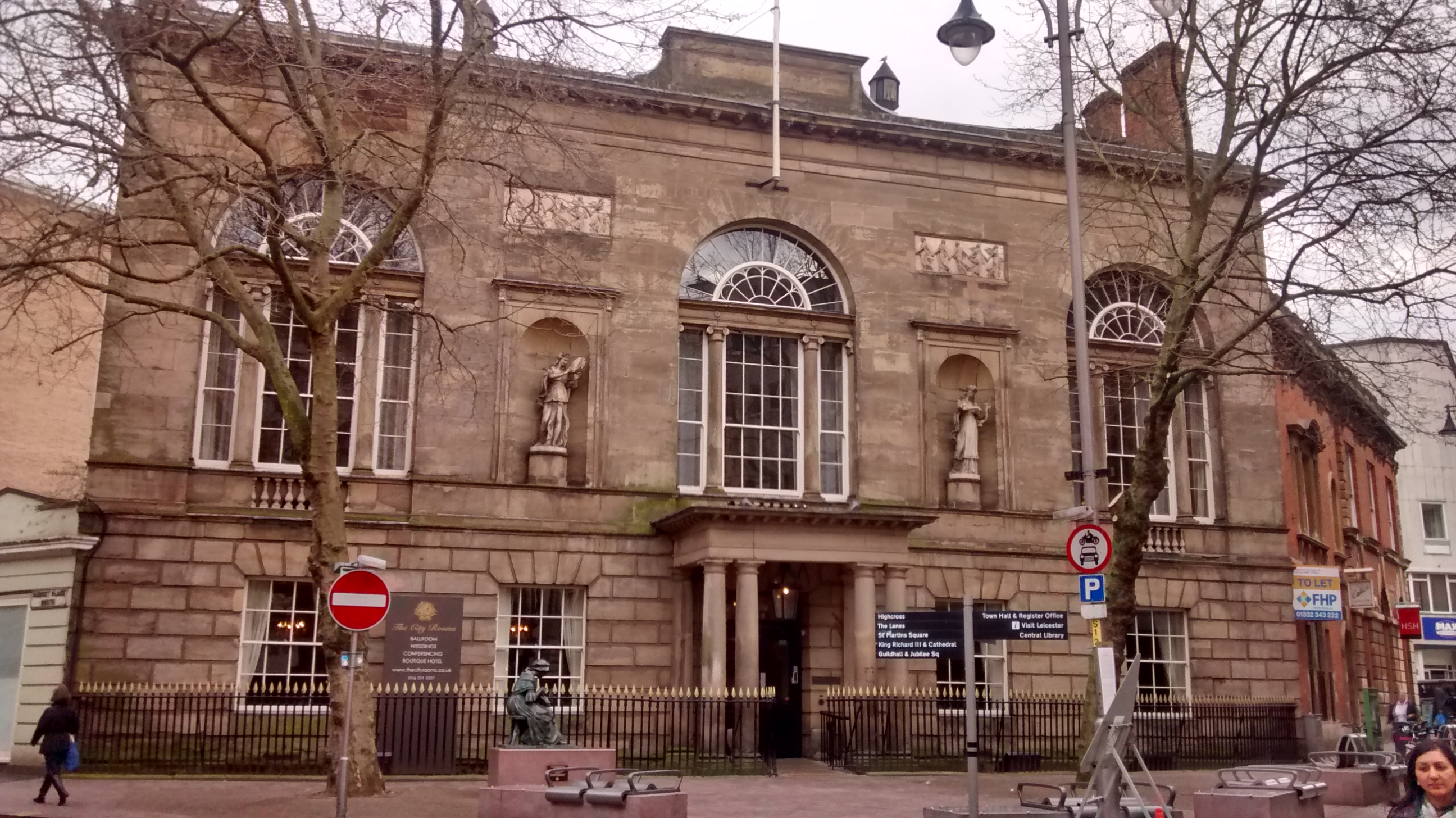
County Rooms, 16 Hotel Street, Leicester: County council's meeting place until 1967, since renamed City Rooms

Having held its first meeting in 1889 at Leicester Town Hall, later that year the council moved its meetings to the County Rooms on Hotel Street in the centre of Leicester, which had been built in 1800. It continued to meet there until County Hall at Glenfield was completed in 1967.

== Cabinet ==
The Cabinet meets monthly and is responsible for the most important decisions affecting the council. It also makes recommendations to the council regarding the annual budget and major plans.

The Leader acts as the Chairman of the Cabinet and chooses up to nine other members.

Each Cabinet member is given specific roles or responsibilities.

== Departments ==
There are six departments:

- Corporate Resources (including property, finance, HR, communications, country parks and traded services)
- Environment and Transport (including highways, transport and waste)
- Adults and Communities (including adult social care, museums, libraries and adult learning)
- Children and Family Services (including children's social care and school support)
- Public health (which commissions a wide range of public health services, including smoking cessation, school nurses and sport and fitness programmes)
- Chief Executive's (including policy, democratic services, trading standards, registration services, planning, legal services)

== Key responsibilities ==
In the five years to 2015, the council's roles and responsibilities changed significantly, due to austerity savings, the transfer of public health from the NHS to the council and many schools becoming academies, independent of the council.

However, that still left a number of key responsibilities. As of December 2015, these are: social care for adults and children; support for schools; highways and transport; public health; waste disposal; economic development; libraries and museums; strategic planning; trading standards; country parks; registration of births, marriages and deaths; and community leadership.

== Financial situation ==
The council claims to be the lowest-funded county council, yet one of the top three best performers, across a wide range of indicators.

From 2010–2015, the council has had to save £100 million – two-thirds as efficiency savings and the remainder from services. The council has predicted it will have to save more from services as austerity continues, with a further £100 million-plus of savings required over the next four years.

As of 2015/16, the council's annual budget was £348 million and it had just over 5,000 full-time equivalent staff.

== Electoral divisions ==
Electoral division	Councillors
Ashby de la Zouch	1
Belvoir	1
Birstall	1
Blaby and Glen Parva	1
Bradgate	1
Braunstone	1
Broughton Astley	1
Bruntingthorpe	1
Burbage	1
Castle Donington and Kegworth	1
Coalville North	1
Coalville South	1
Crosby and Countesthorpe	1
De Montfort (Hinckley)	1
Earl Shilton	1
East Wigston	1
Enderby and Lubbesthorpe	1
Forest and Measham	1
Gartree	1
Glenfields, Kirby Muxloe and Leicester Forests	2
Groby and Ratby	1
Hollycroft (Hinckley)	1
Ibstock and Appleby	1
Launde	1
Gartree	1
Loughborough East	1
Loughborough North	1
Loughborough North West	1
Loughborough South	1
Loughborough South West	1
Lutterworth	1
Mallory	1
Market Harborough East	1
Market Harborough West and Foxton	1
Markfield Desford and Thornton	1
Melton East	1
Melton West	1
Melton Wolds	1
Narborough and Whetstone	1
North Wigston	1
Oadby	2
Quorn and Barrow	1
Rothley and Mountsorrel	1
Shepshed	1
Sileby and The Wolds	1
South and West Wigston	1
St Marys (Hinckley)	1
Stoney Stanton and Croft	1
Syston Fosse	1
Syston Ridgeway	1
Thurmaston Ridgemere	1
Valley	1

== Notable members ==
- Charles Manners, 10th Duke of Rutland, was a county councillor 1945–1985 and Chairman 1974–1977.
- Amanda Hack, British Labour Party politician who has been Member of Parliament (MP) for North West Leicestershire since 2024. Before becoming an MP she was a councillor on Leicestershire County Council, representing the Braunstone division from 2017.

== See also ==
- Aberglaslyn Hall
- Local government in England
