= Amanda Hack =

British politician (elected 2024)

Amanda Hack MP
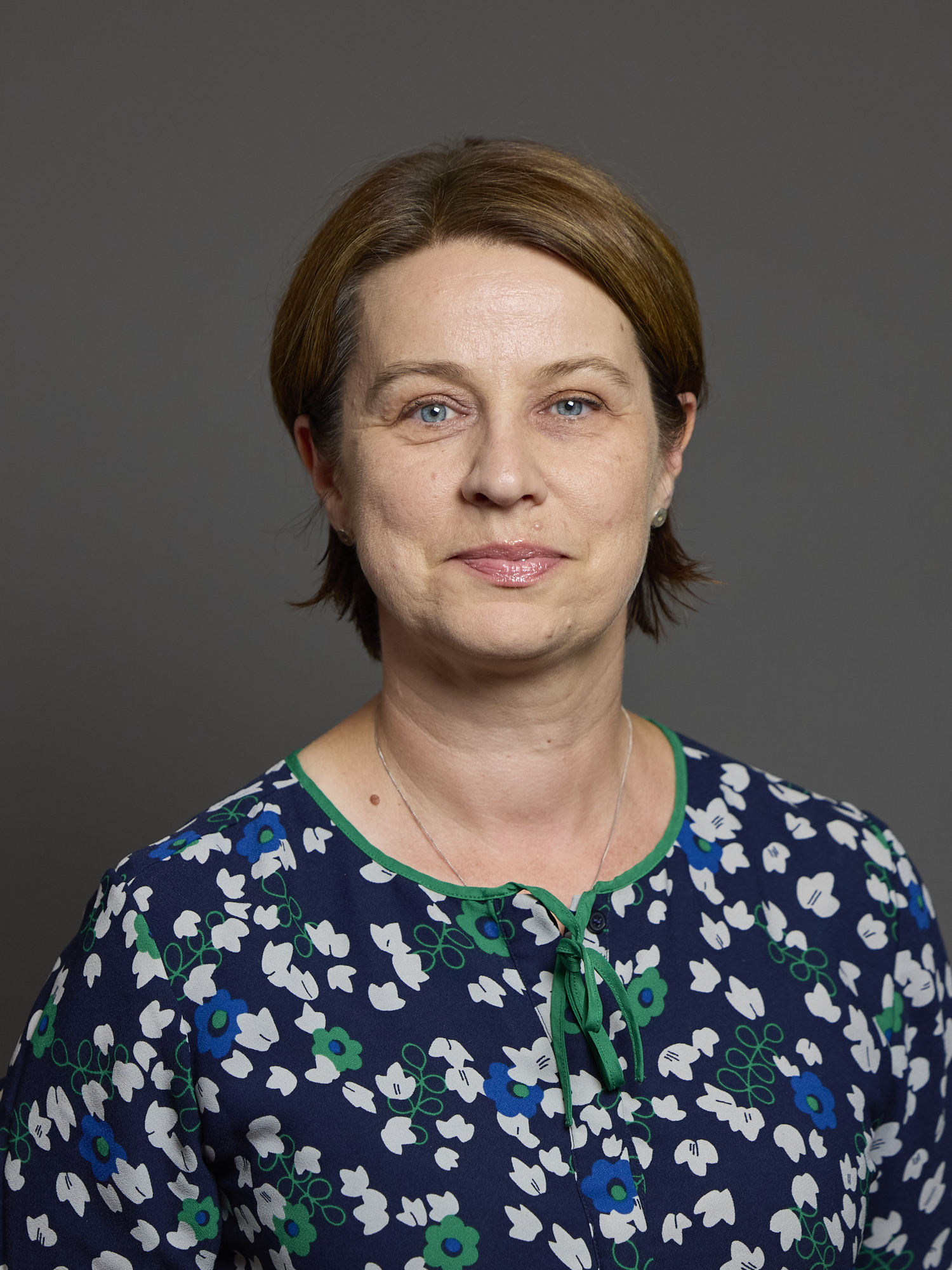
- Official portrait, 2024

Member of Parliament for North West Leicestershire
- Incumbent
- Assumed office 4 July 2024
- Preceded by: Andrew Bridgen
- Majority: 1,012 (2.0%)

Personal details
- Born: July 1976 (age 50) Cleethorpes, Lincolnshire, England
- Party: Labour
- Education: De Montfort University

Amanda Jayne Hack (born July 1976) is a British Labour Party politician who has been Member of Parliament (MP) for North West Leicestershire since 2024.

== Early life and education ==
Hack was born in July 1976. She grew up in Cleethorpes, Lincolnshire, moving to Leicester to read business at De Montfort University. Before becoming an MP she contested the seat of South Leicestershire at the 2015 General Election. She later became a councillor on Leicestershire County Council, representing the Braunstone division from 2017. She also worked for a housing association for vulnerable people.

== Political career ==
In the 2024 General Election, Hack was elected Member of Parliament (MP) for North West Leicestershire with 16,871 votes (34.7%) and a majority of 1,012 over the second place Conservative candidate. Upon joining the House of Commons, Hack was elected as a member of the Work and Pensions Select Committee.

Hack was appointed as a parliamentary private secretary to the Leader of the House of Commons in March 2026.

Parliament of the United Kingdom
Preceded by Andrew Bridgen	Member of Parliament for North West Leicestershire; 2024–present	Incumbent
