= Henry Halford =

18th/19th-century English royal physician

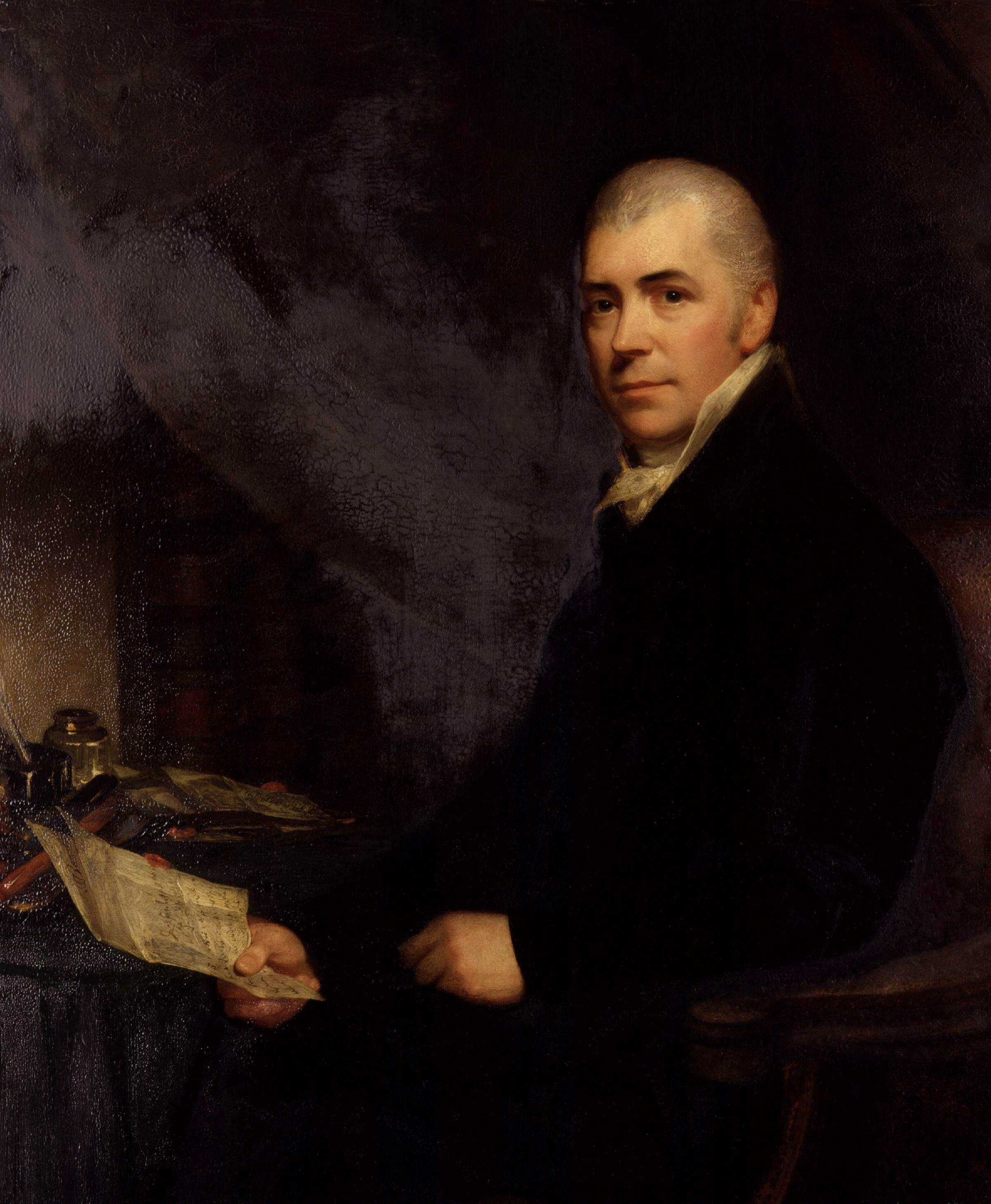
Sir Henry Halford, 1st Bt, by Sir William Beechey

Sir Henry Halford, 1st Baronet, GCH (2 October 1766 – 1844), born Henry Vaughan, was president of the Royal College of Physicians for 24 years. As the royal and society physician, he was physician extraordinary to King George III from 1793 to 1820, then as physician in ordinary to his three successors – George IV, William IV and the young Victoria. He also served other members of the royal family until his death.

== Early life ==
Halford was born as Henry Vaughan at Leicester, the second but eldest surviving son of Dr. James Vaughan (27 March 1740 – 19 August 1813), an eminent physician at Leicester, and his wife, Hester née Smalley (d. 2 or 7 April 1791), His brothers were Sir John Vaughan, judge; Peter Vaughan, Warden of Merton College, Oxford, and Dean of Chester; and Sir Charles Richard Vaughan, minister plenipotentiary to Switzerland and to the United States.

He was educated at Rugby School, and there developed his love for classical literature. He went from Rugby to Christ Church, Oxford, where he matriculated in 1781, aged 15, and graduated B.A. & M.A. 1788, B.Med. 1790, D.Med. 1791. He also studied in Edinburgh (where he presumably studied the Scottish system of medicine).

== Professional career ==
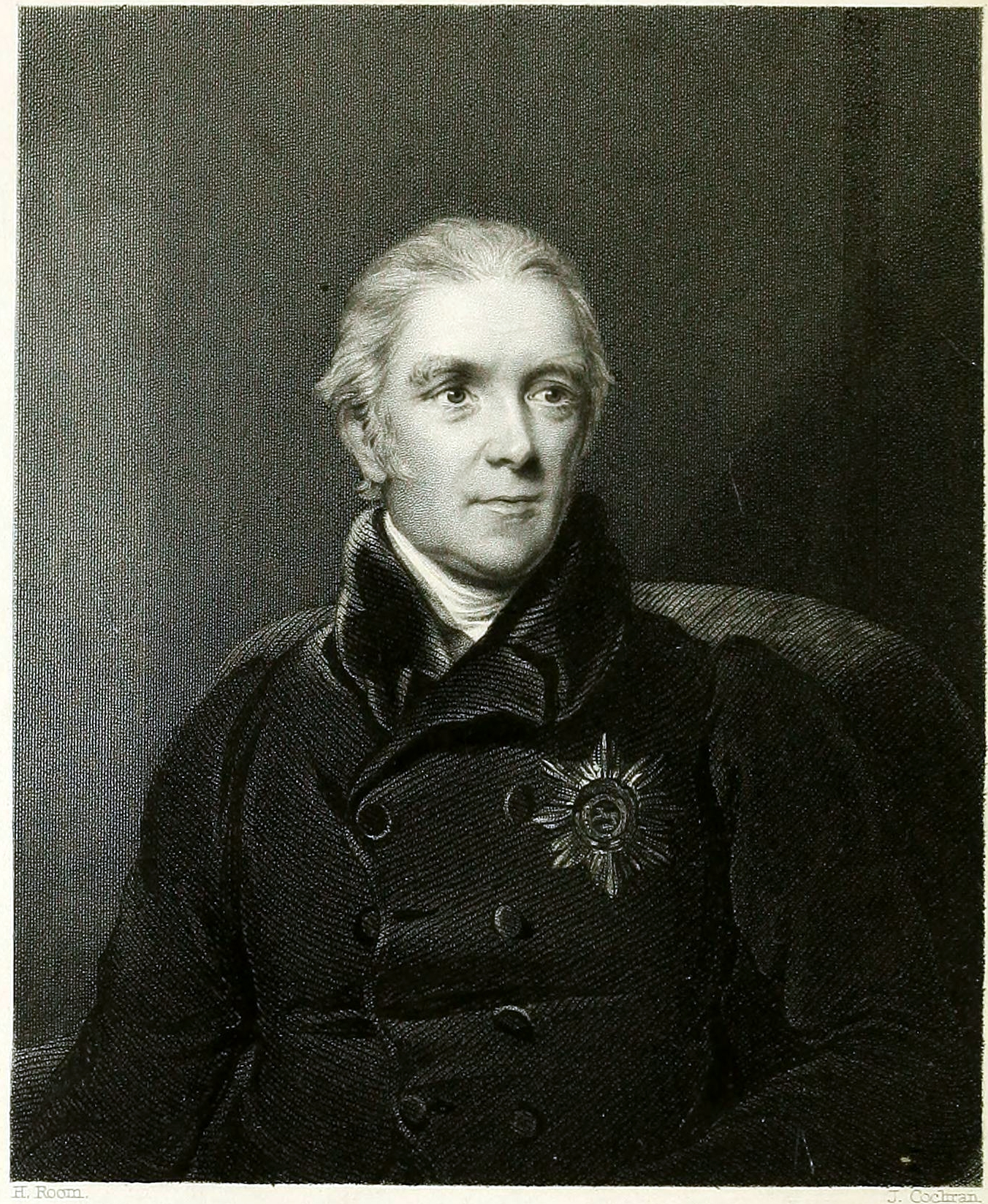
Portrait of Halford from an 1838 book

Vaughan (as he then was) practised for a short time with his father at Leicester. He went to London in about 1792, and was initially told that he could not succeed for five years, and must support himself on £300 annually in private income. Undaunted, he borrowed £1,000, and started his professional life in London. He advanced rapidly, owing in part to his smooth manners and his Oxford connections.

He was elected physician to the Middlesex hospital on 20 February 1793; was admitted a Candidate of the Royal College of Physicians on 25 March 1793; and a Fellow on 14 April 1794. In 1793, he was appointed physician extraordinary to the king (the youngest ever appointed aged 27). By the year 1800, his private engagements had become so numerous, that he was compelled to relinquish his hospital appointment. His professional career was undoubtedly advanced by his marriage in 1795 to Elizabeth, the daughter of John St John, 12th Baron St John of Bletso.

Halford's Name Act 1815
- Act of Parliament
- Parliament of the United Kingdom
- Long title: An Act for continuing and confirming on Sir Henry Halford Baronet, and the Heirs Male of his Body, the Surname and Arms of Halford only.
- Citation: 55 Geo. 3. c. 82 Pr.

Dates
- Royal assent: 2 May 1815

In 1809 he was made a baronet and changed his name from Vaughan to Halford in expectation of his inheritance (see below). His change of name was confirmed by a private act of Parliament, Halford's Name Act 1815 (55 Geo. 3. c. 82 Pr.).

In 1810, he was President of the Medical and Chirurgical Society of London.

During the 1813 exhumation of King Charles I, Halford removed half of the fourth cervical vertebra, which bore the distinct marks of the executioner's axe. The fifth vertebra was not the one removed. The body of the executed king was found in the vault of Henry VIII in St George's Chapel, Windsor Castle, during repairs. The head, which had been sewn back onto the body for burial, was disengaged, and a tooth, some hair, and the part of the severed vertebra were taken as "relics" by Halford, reportedly with the Prince Regent's permission. Halford kept these items in his private collection and occasionally displayed them to guests as historical curiosities. In 1888, the relics, including the vertebral fragment, were returned to the vault and placed in the king's coffin in the presence of the Prince of Wales (later King Edward VII).

In 1812, Halford was appointed physician in ordinary to George III of the United Kingdom, having previously been appointed physician in ordinary to the Prince Regent. He continued to serve as physician in ordinary to successive sovereigns until his death in 1844. He also served as physician to other members of the Royal Family, notably the Princess Amelia, youngest daughter of George III.

Halford was also notably active in the Royal College of Physicians, serving in various posts. On 30 September 1820 he was elected president, an office to which he was annually and unanimously re-elected for an unprecedented 24 years, until his death on 9 March 1844 in the seventy-eighth year of his age. The College owes its removal from Warwick-lane to Pall-mall East in 1825 to Sir Henry Halford's exertions.

Halford was a fellow of the Royal and Antiquarian societies, and a trustee of Rugby School which he had attended; and, in virtue of his office as President of the College of Physicians, he was president of the National Vaccine Establishment, and a trustee of the British Museum.

He was known to his contemporaries as "The Prince and Lord Chesterfield of all medical practitioners", and less complimentarily as "the eel-backed baronet in consequence of his deep and oft-repeated bows." Among his recorded advice is: "Never read by candlelight anything smaller than the Ace of Clubs".

== Halford inheritance ==
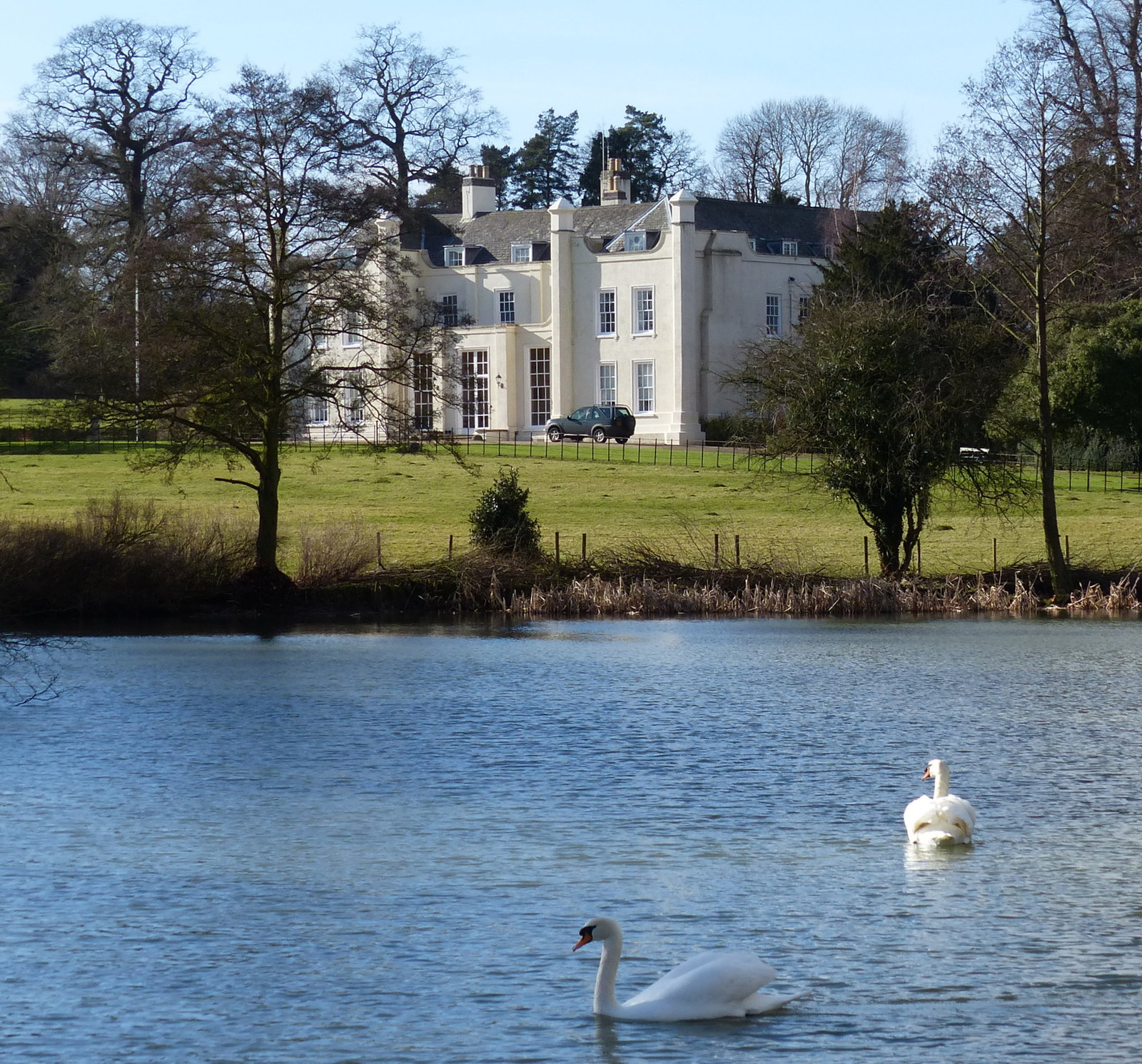
Wistow Hall

Halford was a great grandson of Sir Richard Halford, 5th Baronet, through his maternal grandmother. As such, he became the heir presumptive to the family's Wistow Hall estate at the death of his mother's cousin Sir Charles Halford, 7th and last Bt, the last of the original Halfords. However, his widow Sarah née Farnham remained in possession of Wistow, and remarried the Earl of Denbigh. She died on 2 October 1814, but Halford (then Vaughan) changed his name in 1809 on the expectation of this inheritance.

Halford finally inherited Wistow Hall in 1814 on the death of Lady Denbigh in 1814). The hall is still in the possession of the family, albeit partially converted into apartments.

Halford died in Mayfair and was buried in the parish church at Wistow.

== Family ==
Halford married 31 March 1795 Hon. Elizabeth Barbara St. John, the third daughter of John St John, 12th Baron St John of Bletso and had children including

- Sir Henry Halford, 2nd Baronet (1797–1868) who married his cousin Barbara Vaughan, daughter of Sir John Vaughan, his paternal uncle, and Hon. Augusta St John, daughter of Lord St John of Bletso and widow of the 13th Baron. They had two sons (both of whom married, but died childless)
  - Sir Henry St. John Halford, 3rd Bart.
  - Reverend Sir John Frederick Halford, 4th Bart.
- Louisa Halford, later Mrs Frederick Coventry (d 30 September 1865), who married 18 October 1819 her second cousin Frederick Coventry (1791–1858), elder son of Hon. John Coventry (second son of George Coventry, 6th Earl of Coventry, and his elder son by his second wife Hon. Barbara St. John, only child of John St. John, 11th Baron St John of Bletso) and his first wife Anne Clayton, on 18 October 1819. They had two sons (who married and left children) and two married daughters.

His father Dr. James Vaughan was the youngest son of the seven sons of Henry Vaughan, a surgeon, who settled at the corner of New Street and Friar Lane in Leicester in 1763. The father was active in the foundation of the Leicester Infirmary. He married Hester Smalley, the second daughter of a Leicester alderman, John Smalley (sometimes called Thomas or William in sources), by his wife Elizabeth Halford, second daughter of Sir Richard Halford, 5th Bart., of Wistow Hall, Leicestershire. Thus, while his paternal background was professional, his maternal grandmother came from the landed gentry. Dr James Vaughan and his wife Hester had at least six sons and an only daughter who married late in life. Halford's siblings included :

- Sir John Vaughan (11 February 1768 – 25 September 1839), third but second surviving son of James and Hester Vaughan, successively King's Serjeant, Baron of the Exchequer, Justice of the Court of Common Pleas and Privy Councillor. He married first his sister-in-law Hon. Augusta St John, daughter of Henry Beauchamp St John, 13th Baron St John of Bletso and secondly Louisa, Dowager Baroness St John of Bletso, widow of St Andrew St John, 14th Baron St John of Bletso and daughter of Sir Charles William Rouse-Boughton, 9th Baronet. Sir John Vaughan and his first wife had children, including a son and two daughters:
  - Sir (Henry) Halford Vaughan (27 August 1811 – 19 April 1885), Regius Professor of History at Oxford University 1848–1858.
  - Augusta Vaughan (5 May 1805 – 12 August 1880)
  - Barbara Vaughan (26 July 1806 – 24 June 1869)
- Sir Charles Richard Vaughan, GCH, PC, (20 December 1774 – 15 June 1849) a British diplomat; and
- Peter Vaughan, Warden of Merton College, Oxford (d. 1826).
- Reverend Edward Thomas Vaughan (c.1774 – 27 September 1829 aged 55), Rector of St. Martin's, Leicester, at the age of 25. He married 1stly 13 March 1804 Elizabeth Anne Hill (d. 16 January 1808 in childbirth), second daughter of David Thomas Hill of Aylesbury, Bucks, and had by her three daughters. He married 2ndly 1812 Agnes Pares (d. 28 December 1878) daughter of John Pares, one of the town's leading bankers, and had eleven children by her. Among them were three sons who were Rectors of St Martin's, Leicester
  - Edward Thomas Vaughan (26 July 1813 – 17 January 1900), the apparent donor of a portrait of his uncle Sir Henry Halford to the National Portrait Gallery.
  - Charles John Vaughan (6 August 1816 – 15 October 1897)
  - David James Vaughan (2 August 1825 – 30 July 1905) founder of the Leicester Working Man's College that evolved into the present Vaughan College, the Adult Education Centre of Leicester University.

Sir Henry Halford also had an only sister

- Almeria Selina Hughes, née Vaughan (1771- 27 March 1837 aged 66); she married 1817, David Hughes, Principal of Jesus College, Oxford.

== Notes ==
Baronetage of the United Kingdom
New creation	Baronet (of Wistow); 1809 – 1844	Succeeded by Henry Halford
