= Upton, Pembrokeshire =

Village and parish in Pembrokeshire, Wales

Coordinates: 51.7071°N 4.8690°W

Upton
- Location within Pembrokeshire
- Community: Cosheston
- Principal area: Pembrokeshire
- Country: Wales
- Sovereign state: United Kingdom
- Police: Dyfed-Powys
- Fire: Mid and West Wales
- Ambulance: Welsh

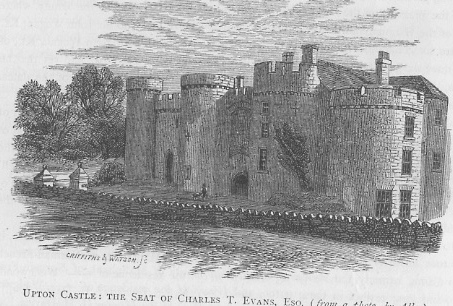
C19 engraving of Upton Castle

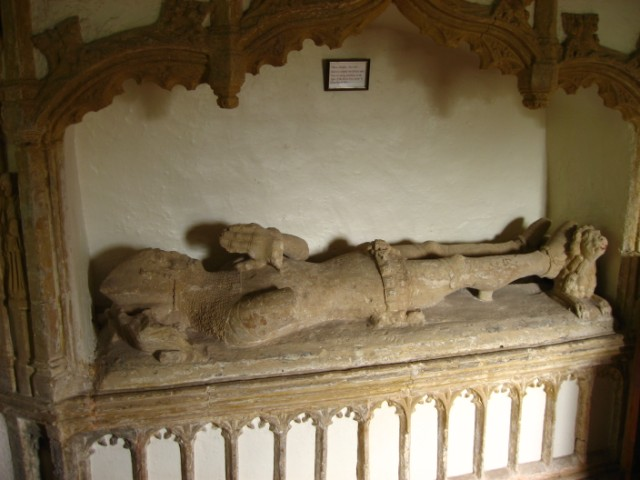
Tomb in Upton Chapel

Upton, Pembrokeshire is a small, rural parish in Pembrokeshire, Wales, in which Upton Castle and Upton Chapel are significant buildings dating back to Norman times.

== History ==
An early mention of the parish was about 1200, when Gerald of Wales recorded a chapel there, subordinate to Nash parish. The Manor of Upton merged with that of Nash under the 14th century Malefants, who had built the castle probably in the 13th century. By the 16th century, the Bowen family owned the manor. The parish is marked on a 1578 parish map of the county.

In the second half of the 18th century, Captain John Tasker of the East India Company purchased Upton Castle; among the eventual beneficiaries after his death were members of the Evans family. In 1833, Lewis, in his Topographical Dictionary of Wales, recorded that the parish was occupied by a single family of six inhabitants. At that time Nash-cum-Upton was a rectory in the non-adjoining Nash parish, to the south. Lewis described the former inhabitants of the castle and its dependencies as Maliphant (sic), then Bowen, then Evans. In 1872, Upton was described as a hamlet in Nash parish, with a population of 24 in three houses. It covered an area of 435 acres (176 ha), 105 acres (42 ha) of which were water.

Tasker Evans sold to Stanley Neale in 1927. The asking price was £9,100.

In 2004, Pembrokeshire Coast National Park said they would discontinue the upkeep of the gardens. In 2006 the estate was sold. In 2012, Channel 4's Time Team carried out an archaeological evaluation of the castle and chapel. Their evidence suggested the chapel was 11th or 12th century, subsequently altered.

Modern maps show only Upton Farm, Upton Castle Gardens and the ruins of Upton Castle and Chapel.

== Upton Castle ==
Upton Castle was the home of the Malefant family, and later of John Tasker (1742–1800), a Welsh sea captain and from 1867 of Sir Henry Halford Vaughan, (1811–1885), an English historian. It is still a private home. Its gardens are open to the public.

== Upton Chapel ==
The chapel is dedicated to St. Giles, and is open to the public. It contains several important features including effigies of the Anglo-Norman Malefant family dating from the 13th to 15th centuries.
