= David Hughes (English academic) =

Welsh clergyman and academic

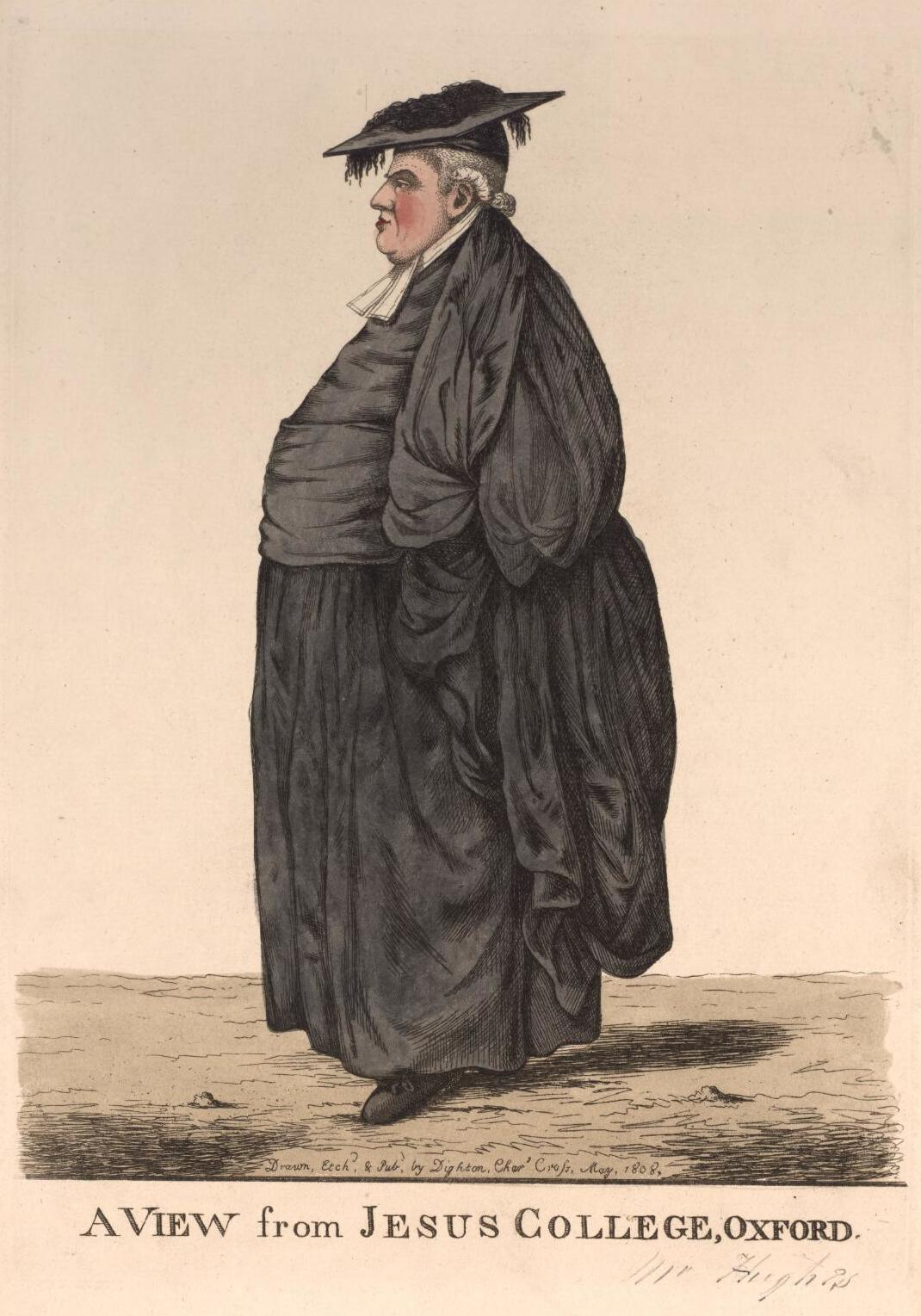
Caricature of David Hughes

David Hughes (1753 – 7 March 1817) was a Welsh clergyman and academic, who served as Principal of Jesus College, Oxford.

Hughes was the son of John Hughes of Llanrwst, Denbighshire, and his wife Elizabeth. He was baptised in Llanrwst on 9 May 1753. He matriculated at Jesus College, Oxford in 1770, aged 16, graduating BA in 1773, MA in 1776, BD in 1783, DD in 1790. He became a Fellow of Jesus College in 1774.

In the church, Hughes held the following livings:

- Rector of Besselsleigh, Berkshire [now in Oxfordshire] (1783–1817)
- Rector of Llanddoged, Denbighshire (1783–89)
- Rector of Yelford, Oxfordshire (1789–1806)

Hughes was elected Principal of Jesus College in 1802. He also served as a University Examiner. He donated £105 to the college in 1809 to increase the value of scholarships for those entering the college from South Wales and England, to reduce the disparity with scholarships for those from North Wales.

Thomas Wynn, 1st Baron Newborough died in 1807. According to his will, his widow Maria Stella, when she remarried in 1810, forfeited the guardianship of their two young sons, Thomas and Spencer (later the 2nd and 3rd Barons Newborough), and Hughes was asked to be guardian. He wrote a record of a dispute with another guardian about the boys' education (he sent them to Rugby School). After Hughes' death, his widow cared for the boys, whose behaviour caused problems, at her home.

On 23 December 1816, Hughes married Almeria Vaughan (1771–1837), daughter of Dr. James Vaughan (1740–1813). Almeria's brothers were Sir Henry Halford (Vaughan), President of the Royal College of Physicians and physician to the royal family; Sir John Vaughan, judge; Peter Vaughan, Dean of Chester and Warden of Merton College, Oxford; and Sir Charles Richard Vaughan, minister plenipotentiary to Switzerland and to the United States.

Ten weeks later, on 7 March 1817, Hughes shot himself in a London coffee house. He died at the house of his brother-in-law Sir Henry Halford on Curzon Street.
