= William Halford (disambiguation) =

William Halford was a sailor.

William Halford may also refer to:

- Sir William Halford, 4th Baronet (died 1695) who was succeeded by his next brother, of the Halford baronets
- Sir William Halford, 6th Baronet (1709–1768), of the Halford baronets
- Sir William Halford, 1st Baronet (1663–1709), of the Halford baronets
- Sir William Halford, 3rd Baronet (1693–1720), of the Halford baronets
