= Henry Halford (disambiguation) =

Henry Halford (1766–1844) was a physician and 1st Baronet Halford of Wistow.

Henry Halford may also refer to:

- Sir Henry Halford, 2nd Baronet (1797–1868), MP for Leicestershire South
- Henry St John Halford (1828–1897), chairman of LCC and expert rifleman
