= Thomas Halford =

Thomas Halford may refer to:

- Sir Thomas Halford, 2nd Baronet (d. 1679), of the Halford Baronets
- Sir Thomas Halford, 3rd Baronet (c. 1663-3 May 1690) MP for Leicestershire 1689-1690
