= John Tasker (sea captain) =

Welsh sea captain and shipowner (1742–1800)

John Tasker (1742–1800) was a Welsh sea captain and shipowner who became the East India Company's Master Attendant at Bombay (now Mumbai) and purchased the Upton Castle estate in his native Pembrokeshire where he was High Sheriff in 1798.

== Arrival in India and early maritime career ==
Seeking his fortune as a free mariner, Tasker was a passenger on the maiden voyage of the East Indiaman Anson and arrived at Bombay on 30 September 1764. He quickly found employment on so-called Country Ships trading along the coast of India and into China, and by 1774 was captain of the Louisa, owned by Governor William Hornby. In 1775 he was paid 10,000 Bombay rupees for carrying East India Company troops from Madras (now Chennai) to Bombay, and in December that year he was accompanied by the traveller Abraham Parsons on the Louisa's passage southward along the Malabar Coast. Parsons, whose account of the voyage was later published, left Tasker at Honnavar where he took on a cargo of pepper.

In the early 1780s he commanded the Shaw Birangore and the Hornby (also owned by the Governor) and, while captain of the latter, captured a vessel sailing under Spanish colours near Macao with a cargo of birds' nests. The captive ship was ransomed for two thousand dollars but, as the Hornby had no letters of marque, Tasker was unable to claim her as a prize and surrendered her to the frigate HMS Seahorse whose captain claimed her on behalf of the King.

He was in business on his own account when, in the early 1780s, he obtained government contracts to carry saltpetre, brimstone and rice from the Malabar Coast to Bombay, provided a packet service for the Bengal Presidency, and imported Madeira wine. In 1785 he was living at Calcutta (now Kolkata), where his house adjoined the landing stage known as Ross's Ghat, and was accepting freight on board the Nancy grab bound for Bombay and Surat.

== Building of the Milford ==
The grab was probably on charter to Tasker (Note: In September 1786 Tasker left Bombay in command of the Nancy and, via Tellicherry (now Thalassery), arrived at Calcutta in October with General Norman MacLeod, his family, and other military personnel as passengers: Calcutta Gazette, 27 October 1786.) but, in partnership with Pestonjee Bomanjee, he had commissioned the building of a 625-ton teak-hulled vessel by the Wadia family of shipwrights at Bombay. Bomanjee was then "the most distinguished and wealthiest of the Parsis" in Bengal and was a brother of the master-shipbuilder Jamsetjee Bomanjee. Their vessel was delivered in 1786 and named the Milford after Tasker's original home waters of Milford Haven. She was in almost constant employment in trade with China and Europe for the next 24 years and received her first thorough inspection in 1810 when "it was not found necessary to shift a timber". (Note: Milford was a two-decker, copper-sheathed and doubled, and armed with ten six-pounders: Lloyd's List, 1800. She was wrecked in the Hooghly River en route from Bombay to Calcutta in August 1829. The record of the vessel's ownership is confused by the circumstance that Bomanjee was a partner in Bruce, Fawcett & Company of Bombay and at times Milford sailed on behalf of and was treated as an asset of the partnership.)

In 1787 Tasker gave "a sumptuous entertainment to a number of English gentlemen" on board the Milford at Canton. Among the guests was the Hawaiian prince Kaʻiana, also known as Tyaana, at whose request Tasker ordered all broken victuals to be brought on deck so that Ka'iana could feed the Chinese who had gathered alongside the vessel. In October of the following year Arthur Bowes Smyth, surgeon in the First Fleet returning home via China, recorded that Tasker and the Milford were then at Whampoa (now Pazhou). Tasker may have disposed of his interest in the vessel shortly afterwards.

== First return to Wales ==
In 1789, believing that he had accumulated sufficient funds for comfortable retirement, Tasker returned to his native Pembrokeshire (Note: The record of his birth is untraced: John Owen, "The Papers of John Tasker and the Tasker-Evans Family", Dyfed Archive Service Quarterly Newsletter, March 1986. However, there was a long established presence of Taskers in and around the town of Pembroke (where William Tasker was Bailiff in 1706) and John Tasker's elder sister Elizabeth was resident in the parish of Monkton when she married John Hitchings there in 1749: Parish Register of St Nicholas, Pembroke, entry dated 11 November 1749.) and in December purchased the Upton Castle estate for £7,000. He took the waters at Bath in June 1790 but, though able to lend Lord Cawdor £10,000 on mortgage in January 1791, he returned to India later in the year seeking to augment his fortune. He left Upton Castle in the hands of his brother-in-law, Rev. John Rees, whom he had presented to the rectory of Nash-cum-Upton (the advowson of which had passed to him with Upton), and engaged Abraham Leach as steward. (Note: For Abraham Leach see Roland Thorne, "The Leach Family of Castlemartin", The Pembrokeshire Historian, No. 7 (1981), pp. 29-51 at 41-43.)

Around the time when Tasker left Upton Castle, Elizabeth Bishop, sister of Mary Wollstonecraft, came to reside there as governess to some of Tasker's grand-nieces, and she continued there in an unhappy frame of mind for more than three years. The Wollstonecrafts' stepmother was a sister of Rev. Thomas Woods, whom Tasker later appointed to succeed Rees as Rector of Nash.

== Master Attendant ==
On returning to India, Tasker entered the service of the East India Company as Master Attendant at Bombay. It was at Bombay that the Company stationed its navy: there its vessels were built and repaired, its crews were paid, and its dockyard maintained. (Note: Abraham Parsons, writing in 1775 but published posthumously, recorded that the port at Bombay contained "such a drydock as, perhaps, is not seen in any part of Europe, either for size or convenient situation. It has three divisions, and three pair of strong gates, so as to be capable of receiving and repairing three ships of the line at the same or separate times": Travels in Asia and Africa, pp. 214-215, containing an extensive account of the marine facilities for which Tasker had responsibility.) Its Master Attendant was sometimes called Harbourmaster or Captain of the Port (Note: C. A. Gibson-Hill, "The Master Attendants at Singapore, 1819-67", The Journal of the Malayan Branch of the Royal Asiatic Society, Vol. 33, No. 1 (May 1960), p. 1 ("'Master Attendant was the official title all through British India, but the holders were not infrequently referred to as 'Harbourmaster'"); Memoirs of William Hickey, ed. Alfred Spencer, Hunt & Blackett Ltd., London, 1923, Vol. III, p. 36 ("The Port Captain or, as the English would call him, Master Attendant").) and was deputy to the Marine Superintendent; he controlled the movement and mooring of vessels at the port, facilitated the works undertaken there, collected the dues accruing to the company, and kept good order about the company's premises. His annual salary was £3,000 and he was permitted to engage in commerce for private reward. (Note: In 1793 he advertised a reduction in the rate of interest he would pay on money held on account for his customers: Madras Courier, 20 December 1793, p. 2.)

His appointment as Master Attendant may have owed something to the influence of Governor William Hornby and of John Hunter who was for twenty years a Director of the East India Company. Perhaps reflecting this obligation, at his death Tasker left £100 to each of them to buy a ring. When Tasker took up the Bombay appointment Hunter had counselled him against allowing ambition for "wanton lavishment of his property" to prolong his stay in India and, while there, Tasker managed Hunter's Indian investments and shipped locally sourced supplies to him in England. (Note: Such supplies were as diverse as coffee and a mango tree. Tasker obliged others with East India Company connections in similar fashion, as exampled by his having ebony furniture made for Rev. Benjamin Millingchamp, late chaplain at Fort St George: Barczewski, Country Houses and the British Empire 1700-1930, p. 138.)

In 1793 Tasker and one of the Bomanjee brothers (Note: Pestonjee Bomanjee was later recorded as Tasker's co-owner (Parliamentary Papers, 1840) but his younger brother Hormusjee Bomanjee was reported to be the interested party on 17 August 1783: Roger Houghton, A People's History 1793-1844 from the Newspapers, April 1783-1796, part 1.) commissioned the building of another ship, the 627-ton and 14-gun vessel which they named Upton Castle after Tasker's estate in Wales. The ship was launched on 21 August 1793 when those attending the event and the following "elegant dinner" included Tasker's "good friend" Lachlan Macquarie, then stationed at Bombay with his regiment.

A few days later Tasker was one of the small party present at Macquarie's marriage and, with the bride's father, he was a trustee of the marriage settlement. Macquarie recorded that he and his new wife afterwards had the use of Tasker's carriage "whenever we want it" and in 1794 they lived at Admiralty House, Tasker's town residence, while he remained at his house in the country. (Note: The circumstance that Admiralty House was Tasker's usual residence suggests the Superintendent at Bombay, Philip Dundas, was not normally present in the port.)

Marine support from Bombay was important for land-based forces during the Third Anglo-Mysore War and for attacks on Dutch settlements in India, but the port itself was not under threat during Tasker's period as Master. It was presumably on account of the protection provided to commercial transport that, when Tasker announced his retirement from office in July 1795, the merchants of Bombay combined to give him their particular thanks for "the prompt assistance afforded the shipping of this port when in a situation of the greatest danger" and for his "exertions and professional abilities so eminently displayed".

Tasker's retirement from his post as Master Attendant was consistent with his earlier intentions. He had considered it "too late in life to enter into extensive mercantile connections", and in February 1792 had written to his steward Leach "If I am alive you will see me in three years and to spend the remainder of my days at Upton". He retained financial interests in India after his departure home, and in 1799 Hormusjee Bomanjee reported having invested in shark-fins and sandalwood on his behalf.

== Final retirement and death ==
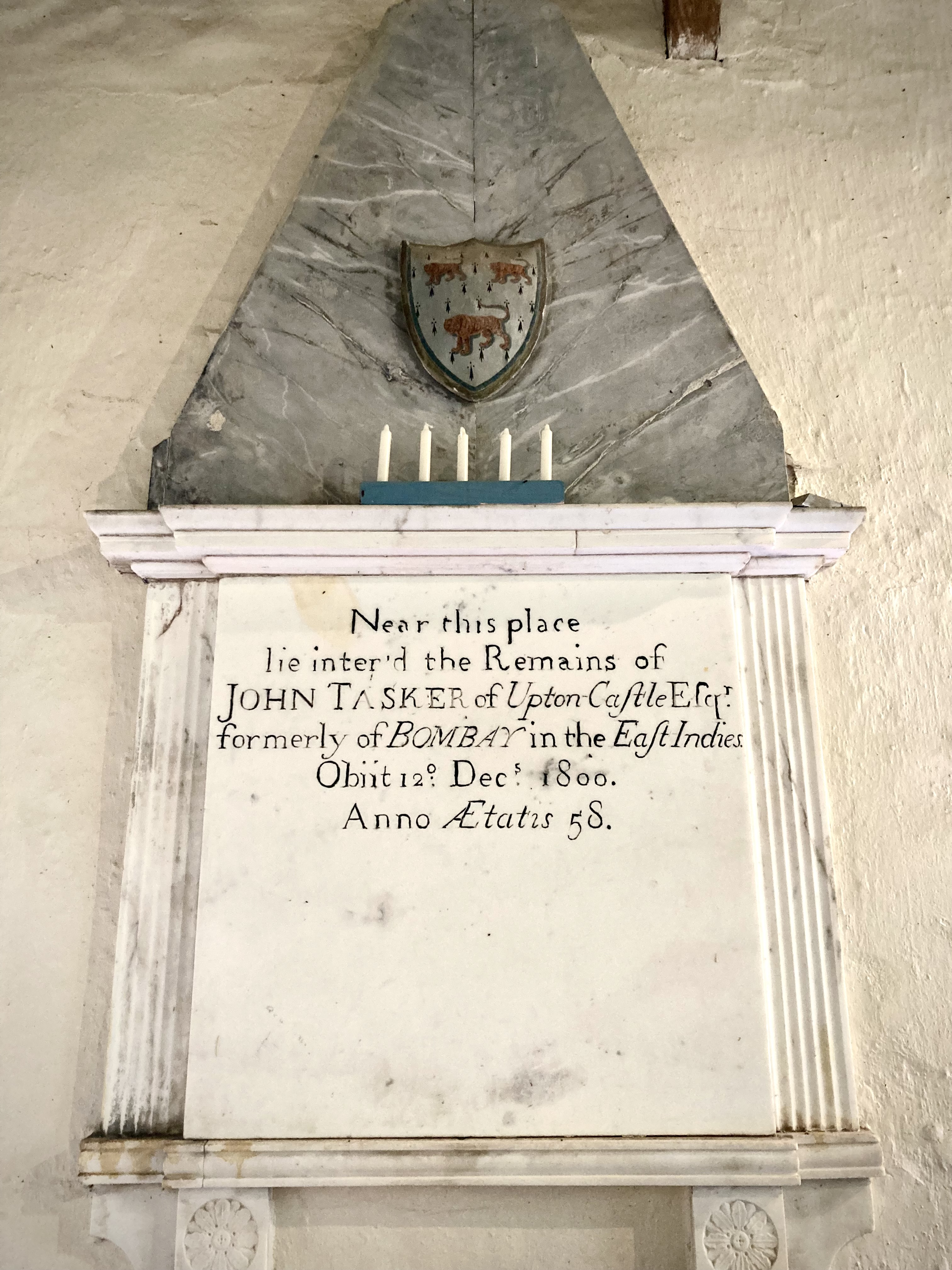
John Tasker’s monument in the chapel at Upton Castle.

In addition to the manor of Upton, Tasker's estate included lands in the adjacent parishes of Carew and Cosheston, and upon his return he embarked on a programme of land drainage and improvement. He undertook restorative work on Upton Chapel, which had been in ruins when he bought the estate, and planned to build a new mansion house though no progress was made in this respect. The list of those to whom he bequeathed "handsome gold mourning rings" in his will indicates his social circle comprised many of the principal landed families of South West Wales (Note: Among the seventeen who were to receive such rings were Lord Cawdor, John Vaughan of Golden Grove, and Hugh Barlow of Lawrenny.) and in 1798 he served as High Sheriff of Pembrokeshire.

He remained unmarried and, dying at Upton on 12 December 1800, aged 58, was buried in the chapel there with what his executor directed should be proper "pomp". By his will and its codicils, all dated three days before his death, he appointed annuities for various relatives and his "black servant Antonio", gave legacies exceeding £14,500 in aggregate, and left his Upton Castle and Carew properties to his grand-niece Maria Jones who had married Rev. Thomas Woods, the Rector of Nash. Maria's descendants continued to own and live at Upton until 1927.

== The boy who called him father ==
Shortly before his return to Wales in 1795, Tasker had sent to his relatives at Upton a dark-skinned boy from Bombay named John William Tasker who, he wrote, "calls me father". In his will he referred to the youth as his "friend John William Tasker" and left him £1,500, and as late as 1803 Tasker's executors contributed to the cost of his support and education.

After six years as an assistant in the office of Forbes & Company, John William Tasker opened his own marine agency at Bombay in 1812. In April 1817 he took delivery of a ship (596 tons) built for him by John Crookenden at Cochin (now Kochi) and named it Upton Castle, the previous vessel of that name having been destroyed by fire at Saugor in February. In 1818 he was recorded as owner of the ships Dandaloy, Jane, Pembroke and Zephyr, as well as the Upton Castle — five of the thirty-seven Merchant Ships then belonging to or sailing out of Bombay. In the same year he took into partnership John Furlong, one of John Tasker's grand-nephews, (Note: Furlong was brother to George Hitchings Furlong, Captain in the East India Company Marine Service (The Standard, London, 12 January 1884, p. 1), and Richard Tasker Furlong, authorised a free mariner at Bombay in 1817 (India Office Records, Z/O/1/8, No.1222) but later Captain, 80th Foot, and Police Magistrate in New South Wales (Morning Post, 23 April 1836, p. 4; Dublin Morning Register, 24 August 1840, p. 4).) but in 1819 their firm of Tasker & Co. was bankrupt and the Upton Castle was seized and sold by the Sheriff of Bombay.
