= Charles Richard Vaughan =

British diplomat

Sir Charles Richard Vaughan, GCH, PC, (20 December 1774 – 15 June 1849) was a British diplomat.

== Early life and education ==
Vaughan born at Leicester, the son of James Vaughan, a physician, and his wife, Hester née Smalley. His brothers were Sir Henry Halford (Vaughan), physician to the royal family and President of the Royal College of Physicians, who took the name Halford in line with a family inheritance; Sir John Vaughan, a Baron of the Exchequer; and Peter Vaughan, Warden of Merton College, Oxford.

Vaughan was educated at Rugby School, where he entered on 22 January 1788, and at Merton College, Oxford, matriculating on 26 October 1791. He graduated BA in 1796 and MA in 1798, in which year he was also elected a fellow of All Souls College, Oxford.

== Medical studies and subsequent travels ==
He intended to follow the medical profession, attending lectures in both Edinburgh and London, and took the degree of MB in 1800. He was, however, elected Radcliffe Travelling Fellow on 4 December 1800, and spent the next three years in Germany, France, and Spain. In 1804, he visited Constantinople, Asia Minor, and Syria. The following year, he made his way from Aleppo to Persia, fell ill near the Caspian Sea, and was indebted perhaps for his life to the kindness of some Russian officers. With them, he sailed for the Volga in November, was shut out by the ice, and had to spend the winter on the desert island of Kulali, but eventually arrived at Astrakhan in April 1806, reaching England by way of St Petersburg on 11 August 1806.

In 1808, in a private capacity, Vaughan accompanied Charles Stuart to Spain, and was present at the assembly of the northern juntas at Lugo; thence he went to Madrid, and travelled to Zaragoza with Colonel Charles Doyle. On his return to Madrid, he was sent with dispatches relating to the Battle of Tudela to Sir John Moore at Salamanca, and returned to England in December 1808. In 1809, he published his Narrative of the Siege of Zaragoza, which reached a fifth edition within the year.

== Private secretary ==
In 1809, Vaughan was also appointed private secretary to Henry Bathurst, 3rd Earl Bathurst, Secretary of State for Foreign Affairs. On 5 January 1810, he became secretary of legation (later of embassy) in Spain, whither he returned with the minister, Henry Wellesley. He was sent to Britain in 1811 to give information as to the state of politics in Spain. He acted as minister-plenipotentiary during the absence of his chief from August 1815 until December 1816, and his correspondence during these years throws much light on Spanish politics.

== Ambassador in the United States ==
On 5 April 1820, he went to Paris as secretary of embassy under his old friend Sir Charles Stuart, and on 8 February 1823, became minister-plenipotentiary to the confederated states of Switzerland. He was appointed envoy-extraordinary and minister-plenipotentiary to the United States in 1825, and on 23 March, he was appointed to the Privy Council. Between 11 July and 13 August 1826, he travelled nearly 1800 miles in the United States; three years later he accomplished another long tour. From 1831 to 1833 he was on leave of absence in England, and during this time had a personal conference with the king on American affairs. In 1833 he was appointed a GCH. Ill health caused his retirement from Washington in October 1835. Though, in Sir Charles Webster's view, a man of 'no great ability', he dealt with important matters such as the Canadian boundary, the Latin American republics, the slave trade, and the tariff. On one occasion, he was fiercely reprimanded by Canning for exceeding instructions. Palmerston thought him 'a steady sensible man, though not very showy'.

== Further travels and death ==
In 1835, Vaughan made a protracted tour of Europe. On 4 March 1837, he was sent on a special mission to Constantinople, and proceeded by way of Malta, where he heard that the mission was no longer required; he therefore went to Venice, and thence travelled home through Italy and Switzerland. In such travel, he spent most of the years that were left to him. He left minute itineraries of his later journeys. He died unmarried in Hertford Street, Mayfair, London, on 15 June 1849. He is buried at Kensal Green Cemetery.

== Sources ==
- This article incorporates text from a publication now in the public domain: "Vaughan, Charles Richard". Dictionary of National Biography. London: Smith, Elder & Co. 1885–1900.

Diplomatic posts
Preceded by Henry Williams-Wynn	Minister to Switzerland; 1823–1825	Succeeded by Hon. Algernon Percy
Preceded by Stratford Canning	Minister to the United States; 1825–1835	Succeeded by Henry Fox
