= Pattern 1853 Enfield =

Pattern 1853 Enfield rifle-musket
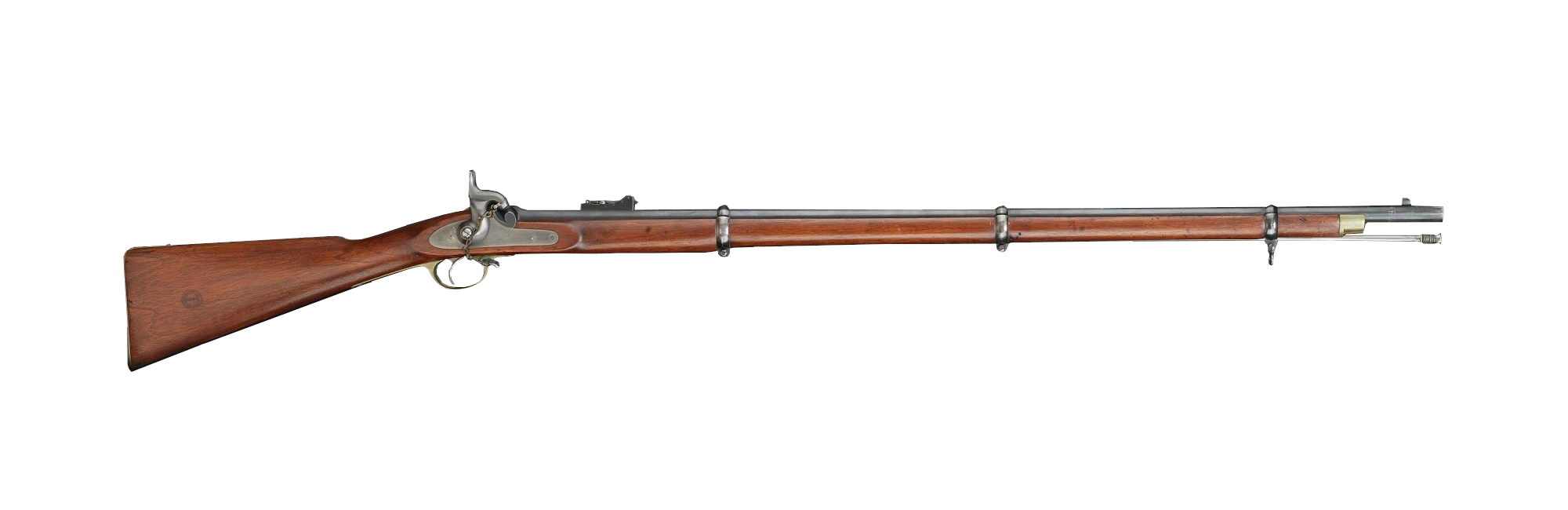
- 1853 Enfield rifle-musket
- Type: Rifled musket
- Place of origin: United Kingdom

Service history
- In service: 1853–1867
- Used by: British Empire; United States; Confederate States of America; France; Empire of Brazil; Tokugawa shogunate; Empire of Japan; Costa Rica; Qing China; Beylik of Tunis
- Wars: Crimean War; Filibuster War; Indian Rebellion of 1857; Second Opium War; New Zealand Wars; American Civil War; Taiping Rebellion; Boshin War; Satsuma Rebellion; Paraguayan War; Fenian raids; Red River Rebellion; Second Schleswig War; French conquest of Tunisia

Production history
- Designer: RSAF Enfield
- Designed: 1853
- Unit cost: $20 (1861)
- Produced: 1853–1867
- No. built: approx. 1,500,000
- Variants: Carbine

Specifications
- Mass: 9.5 lb (4.3 kg) unloaded
- Length: 55 in (1,400 mm)
- Barrel length: 39 in (990 mm)
- Cartridge: .550 expanding conical bullet
- Calibre: .577 in (14.7 mm)
- Action: Percussion lock
- Rate of fire: User dependent, usually 3-4 rounds a minute
- Muzzle velocity: 1,250 ft/s (380 m/s)
- Effective firing range: 300 yd (270 m)
- Maximum firing range: 1,250 yd (1,140 m)
- Feed system: Muzzle-loaded
- Sights: Adjustable ramp rear sights, fixed blade front sight

The Enfield Pattern 1853 rifle-musket (also known as the Pattern 1853 Enfield, P53 Enfield, and Enfield rifle-musket) was a .577 calibre Minié-type muzzle-loading rifled musket, used by the British Empire from 1853 to 1867; after which many were replaced in service by the cartridge-loaded Snider–Enfield rifle.

== History and development ==
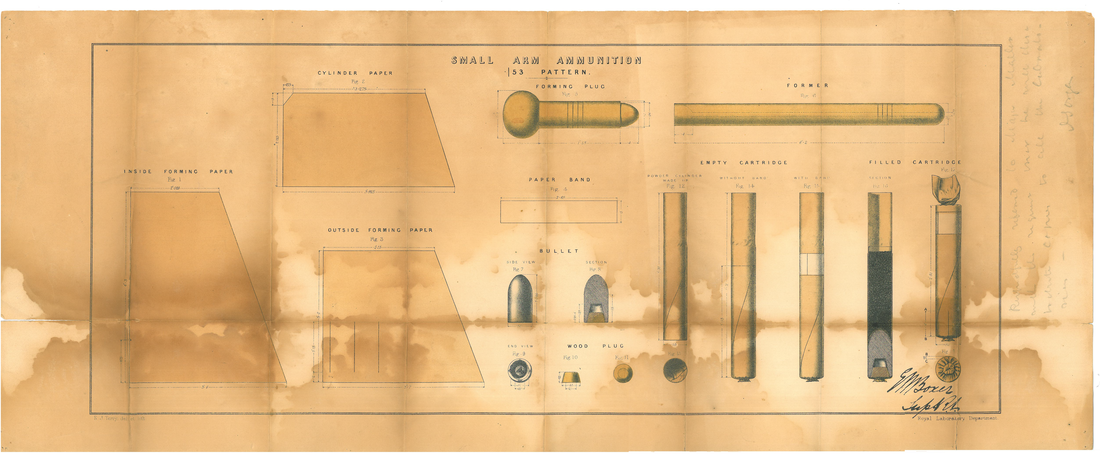
The parts of the Enfield cartridge, including the papers, the Pritchett bullet, and forming tools

The term "rifle-musket" originally referred to muskets with the smooth-bored barrels replaced with rifled barrels. The length of the barrels were unchanged, allowing the weapons to be fired in ranks, since a long rifle was necessary to enable the muzzles of the second rank of soldiers to project beyond the faces of the men in front. The weapon would also be sufficiently long when fitted with a bayonet to be effective against cavalry. Such weapons manufactured with rifled barrels, muzzle loading, single shot, and utilizing the same firing mechanism, also came to be called rifle-muskets.

Royal Small Arms Factory developed the Pattern 1853 Enfield in the 1850s. The 39 in (99 cm) barrel had three grooves, with a 1:78 rifling twist, and was fastened to the stock with three metal bands, so that the rifle was often called a "three band" model. The rifle's cartridges contained 2 1/2 drams, or 68 grains (4.4 g) of gunpowder, and the ball was typically a 530-grain (34 g) Boxer modification of the Pritchett & Metford or a Burton-Minié, which would be driven out at approximately 1,250 feet (380 m) per second.

The original Pritchett design was modified by Col. Boxer, who reduced the diameter to 0.55 after troops found the original 0.568 too hard to load during the Indian Mutiny, changing the mixed beeswax-tallow lubrication to pure beeswax for the same reason, and added a clay plug to the base to facilitate expansion, as the original Pritchett design, which relied only on the explosion of the charge, was found to cause excessive fouling from too slow an expansion, allowing unburnt powder to escape around the bullet. The Enfield's adjustable ladder rear sight had steps for 100 yards (91 m) – the first position – 200 yards (180 m), 300 yards (270 m), and 400 yards (370 m). For distances beyond that, an adjustable flip-up blade sight was graduated (depending on the model and date of manufacture) from 900 yards (820 m) to 1,250 yards (1,140 m). British soldiers were trained to hit a target 6 feet (180 cm) by 2 feet (61 cm) – with a 2 feet (61 cm) diameter bull's eye, counting 2 points – out to 600 yards (550 m). The target used from 650 yards (590 m) to 900 yards (820 m) had a 3 feet (91 cm) bull's eye, with any man scoring 7 points with 20 rounds at that range being designated a marksman.

== Crimean War ==
With war breaking out between the Turks and the Russians, Britain realized that it was only a matter of time before they would be drawn into the conflict. The British Army was in the midst of a significant weapons transformation from smoothbore muskets to rifled muskets. While three of the four divisions of the field army in the Crimea had been supplied with the Pattern 1851 Minié rifle, the other regiments of the army around the Empire still carried the 1842 pattern smoothbore musket. By the end of 1853, the Enfield rifle-musket was approved by the War Department for the army and was put into production. The Enfield saw extensive action in the Crimean War, 1854–1856, with the first Enfield rifles being issued to troops from February 1855.

== The Filibuster War ==
The instability in Central America after the collapse of the Federal Republic of Central America forced Costa Rica to reform and modernize its army, especially after a threat of invasion from Nicaragua in 1848. With the arrival of Juan Rafael Mora Porras as president in 1849, Costa Rica acquired between 500 and 2,000 1853 Enfield rifles in 1855. Later that year, the adventurer and mercenary William Walker imposed a military dictatorship in Nicaragua, reimposing slavery and threatening to conquer all of Central America. The 1853 Enfield rifle was used in the Filibuster War exclusively by the Costa Rican army, beginning with the Battle of Santa Rosa and the Second Battle of Rivas in March and April 1856.

== Indian Rebellion of 1857; Sepoy Mutiny ==
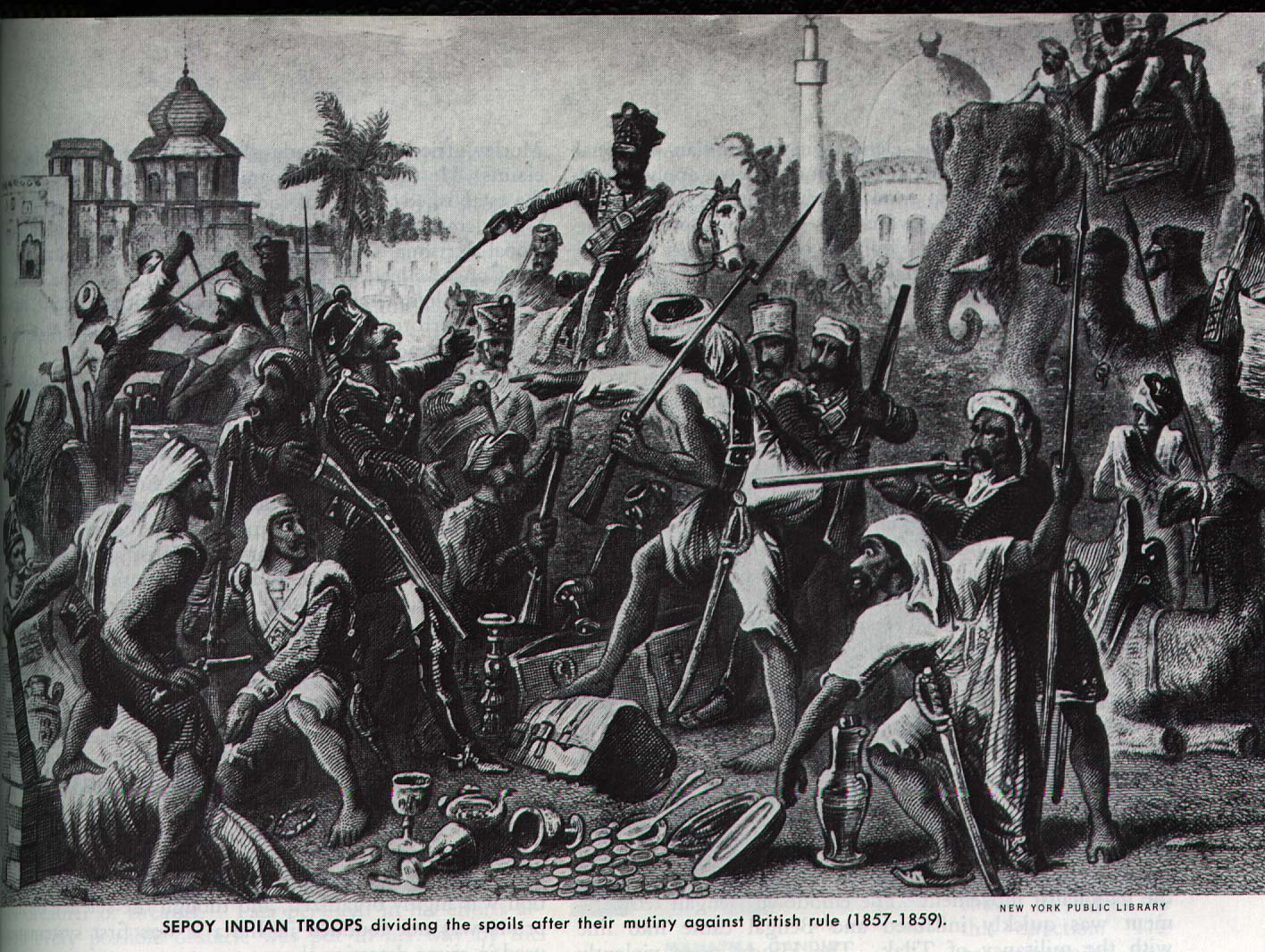
An engraving titled Sepoy Indian troops dividing the spoils after their mutiny against British rule, which include a number of muskets

The Enfield P53 was introduced to Indian troops under British rule in 1856. The Enfield rifle-musket was a contributing cause of the Indian rebellion of 1857. Sepoys in the British East India Company's armies in India were issued with the new rifle in 1857, and rumours were spread that the cartridges (referring here to paper-wrapped powder and projectile, not to metallic cartridges) were greased with beef tallow, pig fat, or a combination of the two – a situation abhorrent to Hindu and Muslim soldiers based on religious beliefs.

British military drills of the time required soldiers to tear open by biting open the prepared cartridge, pour the gunpowder contained within down the barrel, snap off the greased end of the cartridge containing the bullet at the muzzle, ram it home, bring up the rifle to the hip, replace the percussion cap, ready the rifle by setting the sights and moving it to full cock, then to present the rifle, marking the target and squeezing the trigger. The musketry books also recommended that, "Whenever the grease around the bullet appears to be melted away, or otherwise removed from the cartridge, the sides of the bullet should be made wet in the mouth before putting it into the barrel; the saliva will serve the purpose of grease for the time being".

The idea of having anything which might be tainted with pig or beef fat in their mouths was unacceptable to the Indian soldiers, and when they objected it was suggested that they were more than welcome to make up their own batches of cartridges, using a religiously acceptable greasing agent such as ghee or vegetable oil. This seemed to prove that the issued cartridges were, in fact, greased with pig and/or beef fat. A further suggestion that the Sepoys tear the cartridges open with their hands (instead of biting them open) was rejected as impractical – many of the Sepoys had been undertaking musket drill daily for years, and the practice of biting the cartridge open was second nature to them. Incidentally, after the Mutiny, manuals amended the method of opening the cartridge to, "Bring the cartridge to the forefinger and thumb of the left hand, and with the arm close to the body, carefully tear off the end without spilling the powder."

As a consequence of British fears, the Indian infantry's long arms were modified to be less accurate by reaming out the rifling of the Pattern 1853 making it a smooth bore and the spherical / ball shot does not require greasing, just a patch. This greatly reduced the gun's potency and effectiveness, as did replacing the variable distance rear sight to a fixed sight. This became the Pattern 1858. However, due to the now thinner walls, the barrel would bulge, and bursting was not an unknown problem. Furthermore, with the bayonet fitted excessive flexing became an issue. To remedy this, an urgent order was placed in England for around 12,000 new barrels made specifying with a thicker barrel wall. This became the very scarce Enfield Pattern 1859 which in good to very good condition attracts a premium.

== New Zealand Wars ==
The Enfield 1853 rifle-musket was issued to the British Army regiments, colonial Militia and Volunteer units and later to the New Zealand Armed Constabulary, and saw extensive use in the mid and later stages of the New Zealand Wars. The first Enfield rifles were issued to the 58th and 65th Regiments, stationed in the country, in 1858. The Enfield was not the ideal weapon for use in the dense bush covered hills of New Zealand because of its length and weight. Special units called Forest Rangers were formed to fight rebels in the bush but after their first expedition into the bush covered hills of the Hunua ranges, south of Auckland, most Enfields were returned and replaced with a mixture of much shorter and lighter, Calisher and Terry breech loading carbines, and Colt Navy .36 and Beaumont–Adams .44 revolvers. The special units kept a handful of 1853 Enfields for long range sniping. The Enfields continued to be used by the many British line regiments in the more open fern and tussock covered country of the Waikato interior.

Numbers of Enfield muskets were also acquired by the Maori later on in the proceedings, either from the British themselves (who traded them to friendly tribes) or from European traders who were less discriminating about which customers they supplied with firearms, powder, and shot. After the introduction of the Snider-Enfield, many of the Enfield Muskets in the Armed Constabulary's armouries were sold off to members of the public, and they remained a popular sporting and hunting arm in New Zealand well into the late 19th century, long after the introduction of metallic cartridge-loading firearms.

== American Civil War ==
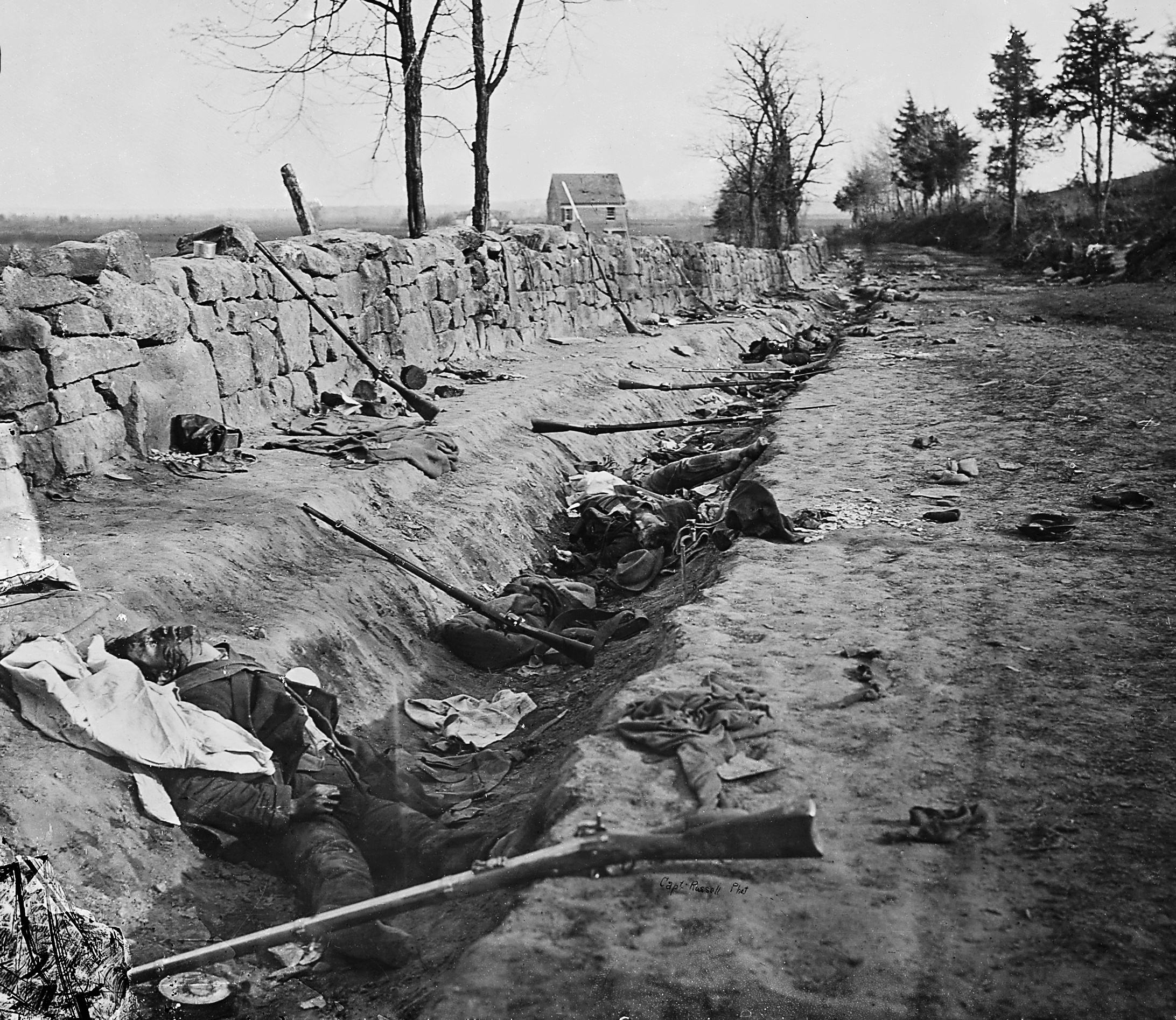
Confederate dead after the Second Battle of Fredericksburg on May 3, 1863. A number of Enfield 1853 rifled muskets are visible.

The Enfield 1853 rifle-musket was also used by both the North and the South in the American Civil War, and was the second most widely used infantry weapon in the war, surpassed only by the Springfield Model 1861 Rifled Musket. The Confederates imported more Enfields during the course of the war than any other small arm, buying from private contractors and gun runners and smuggling them into Southern ports through blockade running. It has been estimated that over 900,000 P53 Enfields were imported into America and saw service in every major engagement from the Battle of Shiloh (April 1862) and the Siege of Vicksburg (May 1863), to the final battles of 1865. The gun was highly sought after in the Confederate ranks. According to a survey taken by British officials during the early stages of war on the arms of the Western Confederate Forces, nearly 70% were armed with smoothbore arms, such as the Model 1842 Springfield. Later in the war the same survey was taken, they found that more than 75% had acquired a rifle, mainly the Pattern 1853 Enfield.

The P53 Enfields capabilities were largely lost by the lack of marksmanship training by both the Union and Confederacy. Most soldiers were not trained to estimate ranges or to properly adjust their sights to account for the "rainbow-like" trajectory of the large calibre conical projectile. Unlike their British counterparts who attended extensive musketry training, new Civil War soldiers seldom fired a single cartridge until their first engagement. After the end of the war, hundreds of formerly Confederate Enfield 1853 muskets were sold from the American arms market to the Tokugawa shogunate, as well as some prominent Japanese domains including Aizu and Satsuma. These units were later used in the Boshin War, and some remaining in Satsuma were also used by rebelling former samurai in the Satsuma Rebellion about a decade later. A large number of Enfield rifles were sent to Mexico to arm the Mexican Army in the 1861-67 War with the French.

== Reproductions ==
The Enfield 1853 rifle-musket is highly sought after by US Civil War re-enactors, British military firearms enthusiasts and black powder shooters and hunters for its quality, accuracy, and reliability. The Italian firms of Davide Pedersoli & C. and Armi Chiappa (Armi Sport) manufacture a modern reproduction of the Enfield 1853 rifle-musket, which is readily available on the civilian market. Davide Pedersoli's reproductions are imported into the United States by the Italian Firearms Group located in Amarillo, Texas.

The British company Parker Hale also made reproductions of the Enfield 1853 rifle-musket and of the Pattern 1861 Enfield musketoon in the 1970s. Those pieces were made to original patterns but are not particularly suitable for use by American Civil War reenactors because they were made to 4th model specs, including having the Baddeley barrel bands. This model (the 4th) was originally made too late to have been fielded in the American War. Appropriate models for that use would be 2nd or 3rd model three band rifle muskets.

== See also ==
- British military rifles
- Rifles in the American Civil War
- Pattern 1861 Enfield musketoon, a shorter version of this weapon.
- Snider–Enfield
