= Henry St John Halford =

English landowner and expert rifleman

Sir Henry St John Halford Companion of the Bath
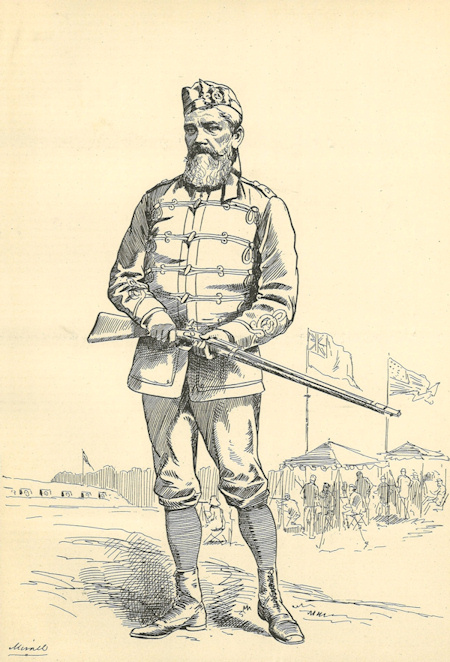
- Drawing of Halford at Creedmoor Rifle Range, New York, from 1882
- Born: August 9, 1828
- Died: January 4, 1897 (aged 68); Wistow Hall, Leicestershire
- Education: Merton College, Oxford, BA, 1849
- Known for: Marksmanship & development of firearms
- Office: High Sheriff of Leicestershire; Chairman of Leicestershire County Council; Honorary Colonel, Leicestershire Volunteer; Chairman of National Rifle Association
- Spouse: Elizabeth Ursula Bagshawe
- Parents: Sir Henry Halford, 2nd Baronet (father); Barbara Vaughan (mother)

Sir Henry St John Halford, 3rd Baronet (9 August 1828 – 4 January 1897), was an English landowner and expert rifleman.

== Life ==
He was born the son of Sir Henry Halford, 2nd Baronet, MP for Leicestershire South, whom he succeeded in 1868. He was educated at Eton College and Merton College, Oxford, where he graduated B.A. in 1849. On his father's death he inherited Wistow Hall in Leicestershire, where he thereafter lived.

In 1860 he took command of a company of the Leicestershire volunteers, becoming colonel of the battalion in 1862. He held the office, with a 10-year break, until 1891, when he was made honorary colonel. In 1886, he was awarded C.B.

He was picked High Sheriff of Leicestershire for 1872, and in 1889 was appointed the first Chairman of Leicestershire County Council, a post he held until 1893.

Halford's main interest was rifle shooting and the development of rifle technology. In its obituary, The Times of London dubbed Halford “the father of rifle-shooting”, noting:

Sir Henry, as he was always called, was perhaps never absolutely the best shot of his generation; a title which could have been claimed, for all-round shooting, by the famous Ross, by Mr. Humphry, and by Captain Gibbs in succession. But, not excepting Mr. Baker and Mr. Wyatt, both of whom have breaks in their shooting history, no man could claim so long and steadily successful a career as Sir Henry Halford.

— "Death of Sir Henry Halford", The Times (5 January 1897)

He was an excellent shot and won several tournaments. In 1877 and 1882 he was captain of a team of eight who shot against an American team at Creedmoor Rifle Range in New York. Halford also took part in the Creedmoor match in 1883. He was for many years Chairman of the National Rifle Association.

He was also a member of the government Small Arms Committee which recommended the adoption in the Army of the Lee-Metford rifle. Sir Henry had worked closely with engineer William Ellis Metford, inventor of the rifle, establishing a workshop and firing range at Wistow Hall to help with the experimental work. Another collaborator on the project was his friend Thomas Fremantle, 3rd Baron Cottesloe, who was also an expert shot. The team made significant improvements in rifling and bullet design.

In 1867 he was engaged in testing rifles as part of the Committee's open trials for a new breech-loader. A Carter and Edwards bolt-action rifle suffered a premature ignition while closing the bolt, badly injuring (or amputating) his right thumb. This serious accident to someone so prominent did not advance the case for bolt-action rifles in Britain and was influential in the Martini-Henry and its falling block action being selected instead, putting the adoption of bolt-action and repeating rifles in the UK years behind other countries.

== Family ==
Halford married Elizabeth Ursula, daughter of William John Bagshawe but had no children. The baronetcy thereby passed briefly to his brother John Frederick, who died later the same year. Sir Henry left Wistow Hall in his will to Baron Cottesloe, whose descendants still own the property.

Baronetage of the United Kingdom
Preceded by Henry Halford	Baronet (of Wistow); 1868–1897	Succeeded by John Halford
