= Wistow Hall =

17th-century country house in Wistow, Leicestershire, England

Coordinates: 52.556464°N 1.055051°W

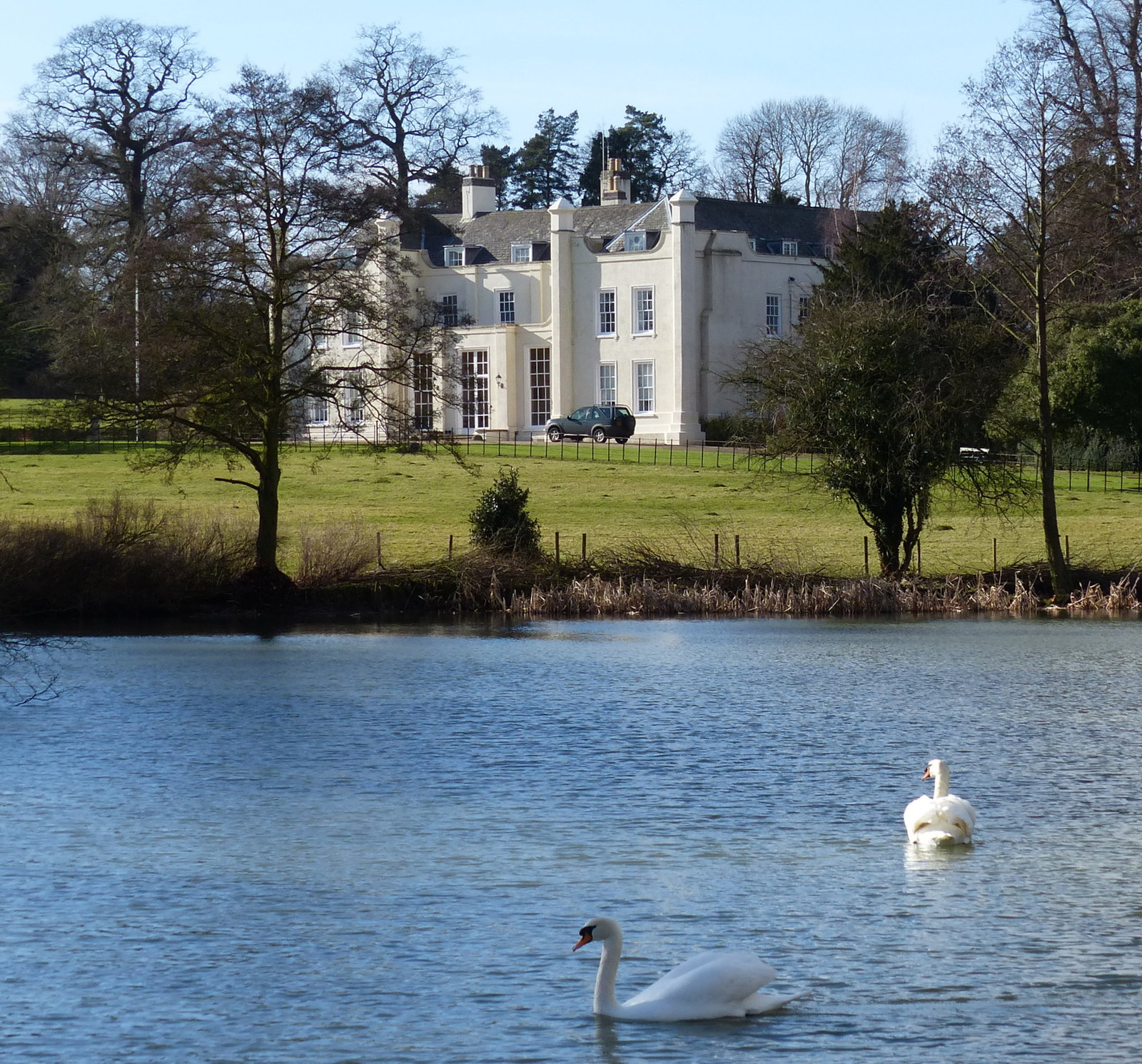
Wistow Hall, 2014

Wistow Hall is a 17th-century country house in Wistow, Leicestershire, England which has been converted into an apartment building. It is Grade II* listed.

The Hall was built to an H-plan of rendered brick with a Swithland slate hipped roof. It has a seven window frontage with two storeys of sash windows and a row of dormer windows in the roof behind a parapet. At each corner are turret buttresses.

== History ==
The Wistow estate was bought by the Halford family in 1603. The Hall was built for Richard Halford, who was High Sheriff of Leicestershire in 1621 and a prominent Royalist during the Civil War. He was made a baronet by King Charles I in 1641 after having been imprisoned (and then released) by the Parliamentarians. King Charles slept at Wistow the night before the Battle of Naseby and returned to the house after his defeat to change horses, leaving his elaborate saddle behind.

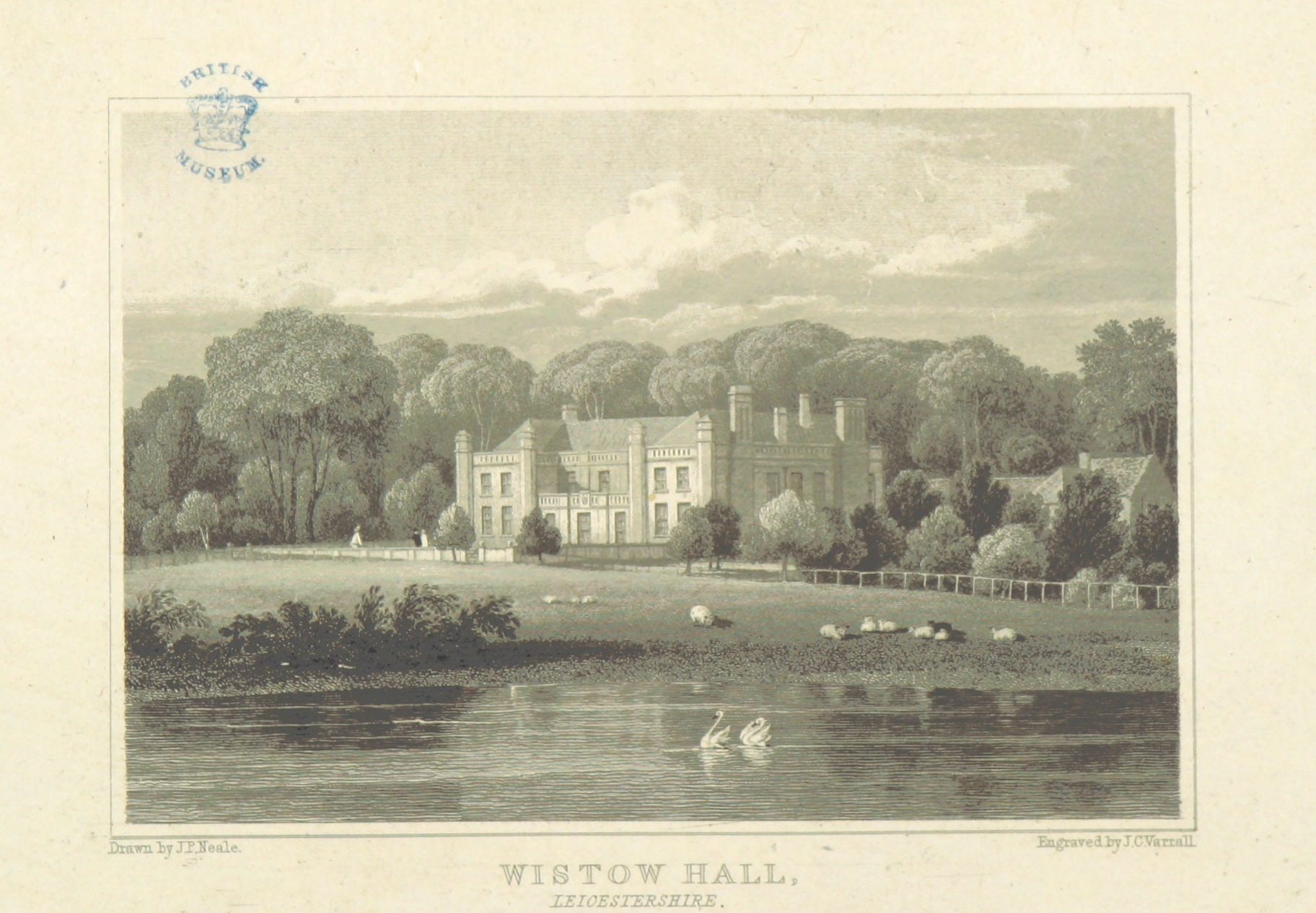
Wistow Hall, 1818

The estate descended in the Halford family to the 7th Baronet, Sir Charles Halford, who died in 1780. His widow continued to live at the house until her own death in 1814, during which time the Grand Union Canal was built through the estate. The property then passed to Sir Henry Halford, 1st Baronet the king's physician who had been made a Baronet in his own right and was later to be the President of the Royal College of Physicians for many years. Born Henry Vaughan, he had changed his name to Halford in 1809 when made Baronet in anticipation of the inheritance. Sir Henry made several improvements to the park, rerouting a road and creating a lake. It subsequently passed to his son, Sir Henry Halford, 2nd Baronet, the MP for Leicestershire South and the latter's son, Sir Henry St. John Halford, 3rd Baronet and Chairman of Leicestershire County Council.

The last Sir Henry was very interested in the development of the rifle and had a shooting range installed at the park, where working with William Ellis Metford he made some significant developments in rifling and bullet design. On his death he left the Hall to his friend and rifle development collaborator, Thomas Fremantle, 3rd Baron Cottesloe. During the First World War the Hall was used as a hospital. The hall passed to John Fremantle, 4th Baron Cottesloe and during the Second World War was used as a refuge for Lutheran priests, one of whom stayed on after the war and ran, together with the 4th Baron's wife Lisbet, the International Christian Centre for Friendship and Service until 1958. It was then given to Lord Fremantle's daughter, Ann, who had married Timothy Brooks, and the couple renovated and modernised the house, converting part of it into apartments.

Timothy Brooks served as High Sheriff of the county in 1979, Lord Lieutenant from 1989 to 2003 and was subsequently knighted. Sir Timothy's son Richard was also High Sheriff in 2012.
