= Upton Castle =

Castle in Pembrokeshire, Wales

Coordinates: 51.7060°N 4.8663°W

- Cosheston, Pembrokeshire, Wales
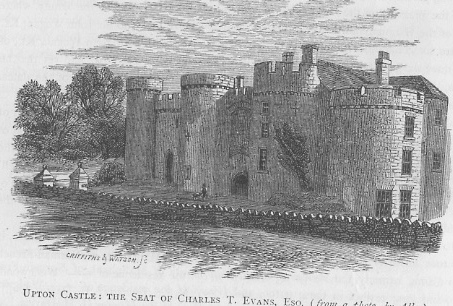
- A view of Upton Castle in 1872, after enlargement and alterations

Site history
- Built: 13th century
- Built by: Malefant family
- In use: Private

Listed Building – Grade II

Upton Castle is a 13th-century castle with an associated chapel, located near Cosheston, Pembrokeshire in Wales. Although in private ownership, the gardens are open to the public. They are listed on the Cadw/ICOMOS Register of Parks and Gardens of Special Historic Interest in Wales.

== History ==
The early history of Upton Castle is shrouded in mystery. Originally known as Ucceton, Ockendon, Octon, Oucheton or Openton the castle was built on a site of early Celtic Christian worship; the Christian burials in the area surrounding the Chapel are radio carbon dated by Time Team to 1010-1160. Time Team discovered evidence of an Apse, a typical feature of Norman Romanesque churches built in 12 th century. By 1188, the existence of chapel at Upton is noted by Gerald of Wales in his book. The castle (purported to have been built in the 13th century) was part of the chain of defensive structures built to impose Norman control over the fertile and strategically important area of South Pembrokeshire it stands close to a creek of the River Cleddau. The first known owners were the Norman Malefant family, in whose hands the castle remained until the 15th century when it passed by marriage to a line that assumed the name Bowen.

In December 1789, the castle was bought for £7,000 by John Tasker Esq, a bachelor of the East India Company, Master Attendant of the Port of Bombay, who possibly built the walled garden. A wealthy man involved in mercantile activities, Tasker lent John Cambell of Stackpole Court, £10,000 by way of a mortgage in 1791. In 1800, upon the death of John Tasker, the estate devolved on his three nieces and eventually settled on Maria, a grand-niece who married firstly the Rev.Thomas Woods and, secondly, the Rev. William Evan, of Hook Norton. In 1811 Nicholas Carlisle described the building as "now in ruins". Between 1828 and 1860 there were considerable alterations to the building, including the insertion of a new door and the construction of two west facing towers .

In 1867, Sir Henry Halford Vaughan British historian and Regius professor of History at Oxford moved to Upton Castle, as tenant, with his wife Adeline Vaughn, aunt of Vanessa Bell and Virginia Woolf. While staying in Pembrokeshire, Virginia Woolf is rumored to have visited her aunt at Upton Castle, though there’s no written evidence. In January 1883 there was a fire at the castle (which was still occupied by Henry Halford Vaughan), attended by a fire crew from the 23rd Regiment, Royal Welsh Fusiliers. The damage was confined to timbers, walls and chimney-piece.

In 1927, Upton Castle was sold, for the second time in its history, to Stanley Neale, a ship owner from Cardiff who undertook the landscaping of the terraces and planting of the arboretum.

Management of the gardens, which had been substantially improved in the early 20th century, was taken over by the Pembrokeshire Coast National Park and opened to the public in 1976. However, the park authority later withdrew their funding and since the property changed hands in 2007, the new owners and a team of volunteers have restored and reopened the gardens. In the summer of 2012, the castle was investigated by a team of archaeologists from the Channel 4 television series Time Team, which confirmed that the chapel pre-dated the castle.

== Description ==
Too small to be described as castle in the strict sense of the word, most sources refer to it as a "fortified mansion" although its towers are unusually strong in comparison with other examples. The medieval portion of the exterior stands to the north east of the range, which is dominated by three early towers, separated by short sections of curtain wall and surmounted by a plain parapet on corbels. Surviving internal medieval features include two fireplaces, a spiral staircase and a vaulted ceiling. It is a Grade II listed building. The gardens are designated Grade II on the Cadw/ICOMOS Register of Parks and Gardens of Special Historic Interest in Wales.

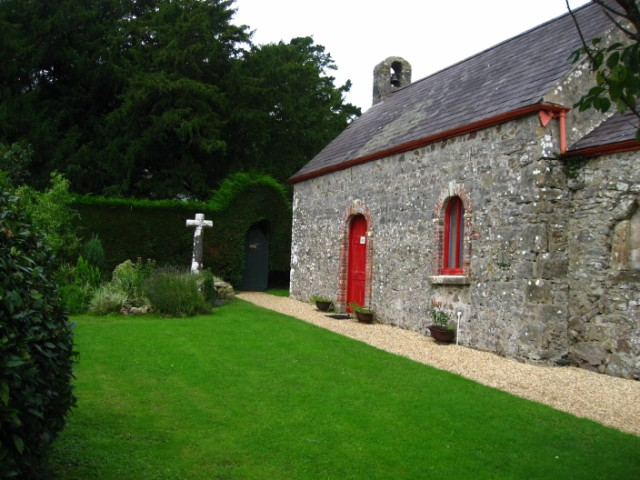
The chapel at Upton Castle

== Upton Chapel ==
Close to the castle is Upton Chapel dedicated to Saint Giles. Dated to the 12th or 13th century, it consists of a small nave and chancel. Amongst the various memorials in the chapel are the effigies of William Malefant (died in 1362) wearing chain mail and another of a female member of the Malefant family. The interior was restored in 1978 by the owner of the castle. It is a Grade I listed building.
