= Milford (1786 ship) =

History

Great Britain
- Name: Milford
- Owner: 1795–1803:Pestonjee Bomanjee; 1803–1810:Bruce Fawcett; 1805:Bruce, Fawcett & Co.; 1812–1816:Pestonjee Bomanjee; 1823:Dadabhoy Pestomjee & Harwood
- Builder: Bombay Dockyard,
- Launched: 1786 at Bombay, or 1788
- Fate: Wrecked in the Hooghly River in August 1829

General characteristics
- Tons burthen: 575, or 576, or 625, or 655, or 65810/94, or 665, or 666, or 679 (bm)
- Length: 127 ft 0 in (38.7 m),
- Beam: 35 ft 0 in (10.7 m),
- Propulsion: Sail
- Complement: 1796:90; 1802:96; 1820:Captain and three European officers + 75 lascars
- Armament: 1796:10 × 6-pounder guns; 1815:10 × 6-pounder guns; 1820:2 guns
- Notes: Teak-built

Milford was built at Bombay in 1786 for Pestonjee Bomanjee and John Tasker. She was a country ship that traded around India and between India and China, though she also traded with England. She made one voyage for the British East India Company (EIC). She was lost at Calcutta in August 1829.

== Career ==
Milford was among the country ships (British ships sailing between India and China) reported at Canton in 1789.

Captain William Henderson acquired a letter of marque on 16 July 1796. Milford appears in Lloyd's Register in 1797 with Henderson, master, R. Bruce, owner, and trade London—East Indies. This entry continued unchanged, except for the substitution of "India" for "East Indies", through the 1803 volume.

Henderson remained Milford's master in 1799–1800. during this time he apparently sailed her to China.

The government engaged Milford as a transport to support General Sir David Baird's expedition to the Red Sea, which in turn had the objective of supporting General Sir Ralph Abercrombie at the battle of Alexandria.

Milford was next listed in Lloyd's Register in 1806 with Douglas, master, Bruce & Co., owners, and trade Bombay—Cork.

EIC voyage (1805–1806): Captain George Douglas sailed from Bombay on 21 October 1805, bound for England. Milford reached Saint Helena on 22 January 1806 and Cork on 6 April; She arrived on 27 April in the Downs.

In 1810 Milford carried cotton and hemp to England. The next year she carried 7,978 piculs of cotton to China.

The Register of Shipping (RS) for 1815 showed Milford with J.Douglas, master, Bruce & Co., owners, and trade Cork–India. On 20 December 1815 Milford, Bowles, master, was returning to London from Bombay when she ran onshore on the south end of Deal. In doing so she lost her rudder and sustained some damage. The deal boatmen got her off and took her into the Downs.

On 5 March 1816, Milford's owners applied for a licence from the British East India Company to trade between the United Kingdom and India. They received the licence on 6 March.

In 1820 her owners tendered Milford for an expedition to the Persian Gulf. She did not participate.

In 1823 she was registered at Bombay with R. Horwood, master.

In 1828 Lieutenant Grant, assistant to the Master Attendant at Surat, saved Milford from wrecking. Also in 1828, the East India Registry and Directory showed Milford with T.J.Jackson, master, and Dadabhoy & Co. owner. The Registry for 1829 carried the same information.

== Loss ==
On 3 August 1829 Milford, Jellico, master, went onshore on the Long Sand near Kedgeree. She had been sailing from Bombay to Calcutta; she was totally wrecked and the 100 horses she was carrying drowned.

When Milford wrecked, several hundred letters washed ashore. Many of these had obliterated addresses and the finders opened them. The contents of a number of them, both confidential government correspondence and private, came to be published.

The Register of Shipping continued to list Milford until 1832, and Lloyd's Register continued to list her until 1833.
