= Halford baronets of Wistow (first creation, 1641) =

Escutcheon of the Halford baronets of Wistow

The Halford baronetcy of Wistow, Leicestershire, was created in 1641 for Richard Halford in the Baronetage of England. It became extinct in 1780 with the death of the seventh and last baronet.

== Halford baronets, of Wistow, Leicestershire (1641) ==
- Sir Richard Halford, 1st Baronet (c. 1580–1658). Son of Edward Halford, of Langham, Rutland and Dionesia Berry. Inherited the Wistow estate in 1608 upon the death of his uncle, Andrew Halford. He was a Royalist, close to Charles I of England, and during the English Civil War the king stayed at Wistow Hall before the 1645 Battle of Naseby, not far to the south. Richard married firstly, Isabel Bowman, daughter of George Bowman, of Medbourne, Leicestershire. By her, having two sons. Firstly, Andrew Halford, of Kilby, Leicestershire (1603–1657). Andrew was noted for his loyalty to King Charles and for being issued a death warrant by Cromwell, for hanging parliamentarian soldiers without trial, Andrew was able to save his life with a bribe of £30,000. Secondly, George Halford (1606–1659). Richard married secondly, Joane Adams. Richard was succeeded by his grandson, Thomas (Son of Andrew) who is next mentioned.
- Sir Thomas Halford, 2nd Baronet (1638–1679). Son of Andrew Halford, of Kilby, Leicestershire and Mary Hackett, daughter of Humphrey Hackett, of Creeton, Lincolnshire. Heir to his grandfather, Sir Richard Halford. Commissioner of the Leicestershire Militia in 1659. In Mar 1668, was involved in a tavern quarrel in London with Edmund Temple, With Thomas killing Edmund and arrested and sentenced to death. Thomas later received a royal pardon in May 1668. Thomas married Selina Welby, daughter of William Welby, Lord of the Manor of Denton, Lincolnshire. They are noted to have had 22 children.
- Sir Thomas Halford, 3rd Baronet (c. 1663 – 1690). He was a Tory Member of Parliament for Leicestershire 1689–1690; he died unmarried. He was succeeded by his next brother:
- Sir William Halford, 4th Baronet (died 1695) who was succeeded by his next brother.
- Sir Richard Halford, 5th Baronet (died 5 September 1727). Great-grandfather maternally of Sir Henry Halford the physician and first baronet of the 1809 creation. He married Mary Cotton, dau of Rev. William Cotton of Broughton Asley, and had five sons and three daughters, including
  - Sir William Halford, 6th Baronet (1709–1768) and
  - Thomas Halford (died 1766). Father of four sons (of whom the youngest Charles became the 7th and last Baronet), and
  - Elizabeth Halford (c. 1703 – 11 June 1772, aged 69) who married John (or William or Thomas) Smalley, an alderman of Leicester, and had with other issue, a second daughter:
    - Hester Smalley (c. 1740 – 2 April 1791, aged 51) whose eldest surviving son was
      - Sir Henry Halford.

Sir Richard Halford, 5th Baronet, was succeeded by his eldest son

- Sir William Halford, 6th Baronet (1709–1768) who died unmarried, and was succeeded by his nephew (youngest son of the next brother Thomas Halford)
- Sir Charles Halford, 7th Baronet (1732 – 21 July 1780) the last baronet of the 1641 creation. Son of Thomas Halford, second son of the 5th Baronet. His widow Sarah remarried 1783 Basil Feilding, 6th Earl of Denbigh.
