= P. H. B. Lyon =

British poet and educator

- Born: Percy Hugh Beverley Lyon; 1893
- Died: 1986 (aged 92–93)
- Occupation: schoolmaster
- Writing career
- Period: 20th century
- Genre: poetry
- Notable works: "Now to be Still and Rest"
- Literary movement: War poetry, Georgian poetry

Percy Hugh Beverley Lyon MC (1893–1986) was a 20th-century British poet and educator, a winner of the Newdigate Prize and headmaster of Rugby School from 1931 to 1948.

== Life ==
Lyon studied at Oriel College, Oxford, publishing a number of lyrics in Oxford Poetry between 1910 and 1914.

He interrupted his studies during the First World War, serving as a lieutenant in the Durham Light Infantry and earning the Military Cross. Taken prisoner, he was in Graudenz at the end of hostilities.

Upon returning to Oxford after the war, Lyon won the Newdigate Prize in 1919 with his poem France, although he was better known for his peace poem, "Now to be Still and Rest". In 1919 he also had a number of poems accepted for publication in Oxford Poetry: "The Secret Playroom (Graudenz, 1918)", "The Song of Strength" and "The Deserted Garden". He went on to publish poetry in periodicals that included the London Mercury, The Oxford Magazine, The Spectator, and the Westminster Gazette.

Lyon was father to three daughters, Jill, Barbara and the children's writer Elinor Lyon.

From 1926 to 1931 he was the rector of the Edinburgh Academy. Within a month of taking up the post, he proposed a redesign of the school cap and during his five years of his rectorship, he set up the Edinburgh Academy Stockbridge Club, a social club for boys in the district, persuaded the directors to install electric lighting throughout the school and himself directed the school's first Shakespeare production, Hamlet.

From 1931 to 1948 he was headmaster of Rugby School. He was mentor and friend to one of his pupils, John Gillespie Magee, Jr., who later wrote the famous poem "High Flight". Magee also fell in love with Lyon's daughter Elinor. After serving as headmaster, Lyon opened the Public Schools Appointment Bureau to find jobs for ex-public school boys.

== Publications ==
=== Collections ===
In 1918 he published a volume of poetry, Songs of Youth & War, and in 1923 Turn Fortune. In 1931 a selection of his verse was published as P. H. B. Lyon in the Augustan Books of Poetry series.

=== Other publications ===
- The Shorter Herodotus, books I-V, selected and arranged, with brief notes by P.H.B. Lyon, in the series Bell's shorter classics (London: G. Bell, 1924).
- The Merchant of Venice, edited, with an introduction and notes, by P. H. B. Lyon, for the New Eversley Shakespeare series (London: Ernest Benn, 1928; reprinted 1934, 1935).
- The Discovery of Poetry (London: Edward Arnold, 1930; reprinted 1931, 1935, 1947), "Primarily intended for use in schools, in those forms and classes where the more careful study of literature is for the first time attempted."
- Foreword to Aleksander Kamiński's pseudonymous Stones for the Rampart: The Story of Two Lads in the Polish Underground Movement (London: Polish Boy Scouts' and Girl Guides' Association, 1945).
- The Bible as Literature (London: Bible Reading Fellowship, 1947).
- Happy Ever After? (London: National Marriage Guidance Council, 1949).

=== Anthologized ===
Poems by Lyon were anthologized in the following collections:

- More Songs By the Fighting Men (Soldier Poets Second Series; London: Erskine MacDonald Ltd., 1917)
- Valour & Vision: Poems of the War (1920)
- Selections from Modern Poets, edited by J. C. Squire
- Later English Poems, 1901–1922, edited by James Elgin Wetherell
- Up The Line To Death: The War Poets 1914–1918, edited by Brian Gardner (1964)

Academic offices
Preceded by William Wyamar Vaughan	Headmaster of Rugby School; 1931–1948	Succeeded by Arthur fforde
