= Robert Taylor Pritchett =

British gunmaker, artist and illustrator

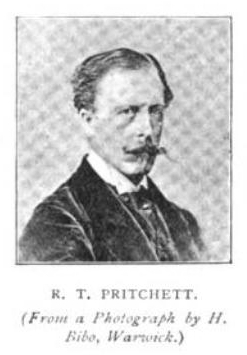
R. T. Pritchett

Robert Taylor Pritchett (24 February 1828 – 16 June 1907) was a gun manufacturer, artist and illustrator. As an artist, he painted royal ceremonies for Queen Victoria, and he illustrated Darwin's The Voyage of the Beagle.

== Early life and career ==
He was the son of Richard Ellis Pritchett and his wife Ann Dumbleton; his father was head of the firm of gunmakers at Enfield which supplied arms to the East India Company and to the Board of Ordnance. After leaving King's College School, Robert entered his father's firm. By 1852 he knew the rifle designer William Ellis Metford; the "Pritchett bullet", with a hollow, unplugged base, which he and Metford invented in 1853, brought him fame and an award of £1,000 (equivalent to £110,000 in 2025) from the government on its adoption by the small-arms committee. As early as 1854 Pritchett was using a three-grooved rifle of his own invention.

The abolition of the East India Company in 1858 deprived Pritchett's firm of its principal customer, and he sought other interests; but for some years he kept in touch with military rifle matters (partly through the Victoria Rifles, which corps he joined at its foundation in 1853), and he lectured on gunlocks and rifles at the Working Men's College and elsewhere. He interested himself in 1854 in the foundation of that college, of which Frederick Denison Maurice and Charles Kingsley were among the pioneers. He remained a liveryman of the Gunmakers' Company until his death.

== Art ==
Art was an important occupation. He exhibited views of Belgium and Brittany at the Royal Academy of Art in 1851 and 1852. He formed friendships with John Leech, Charles Keene, and Birket Foster. Through John Tenniel he joined the staff of Punch, for which he executed some 26 drawings between 1863 and 1869. In 1865 he sketched in Skye and the Hebrides, and next year he executed 100 illustrations for Cassell, Petter and Galpin.

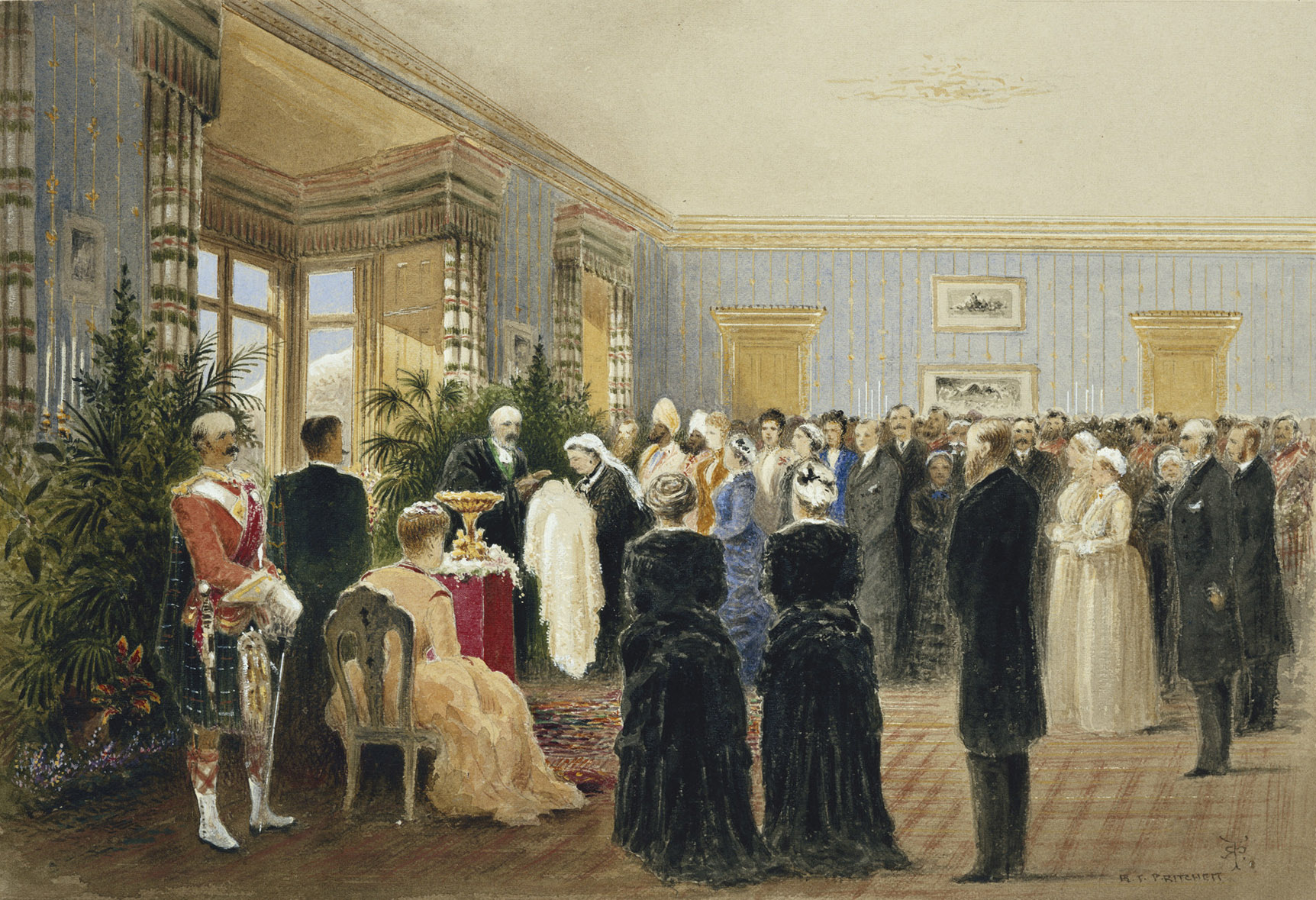
"Baptism of Princess Victoria Eugenie of Battenberg at the drawing room of Balmoral Castle" (1887)

In 1868, after a visit to the Netherlands, he received a commission for work from Thomas Agnew & Sons, who showed a collection of his pictures in their galleries in 1869. One picture was purchased by Queen Victoria, and he was soon employed on many water-colour drawings of royal functions, from "Thanksgiving Day" in 1872 to Queen Victoria's funeral in 1901. He returned to the Netherlands, where he dined at Het Loo Palace with King Leopold II of Belgium and met the painter Jozef Israëls. In 1869 and 1871 he exhibited scenes of Scheveningen at the Royal Academy, and in the latter year he published Brush Notes in Holland and made numerous sketches in Paris after the Commune. After a visit to Norway in 1874–75 he published Gamle Norge (1878).

== Cruises ==
In 1880 he cruised round the world with Mr and Mrs Joseph Lambert in their yacht The Wanderer, and illustrated their book The Voyage of the Wanderer (1883). In 1883 and 1885 he joined as artist the tours of Thomas (afterwards Earl) and Lady Brassey in the yacht Sunbeam, and many of his drawings appeared in Lady Brassey's In the Trades, the Tropics and the Roaring Forties (1885) and The Last Voyage of the Sunbeam (1889).

== Illustrations ==
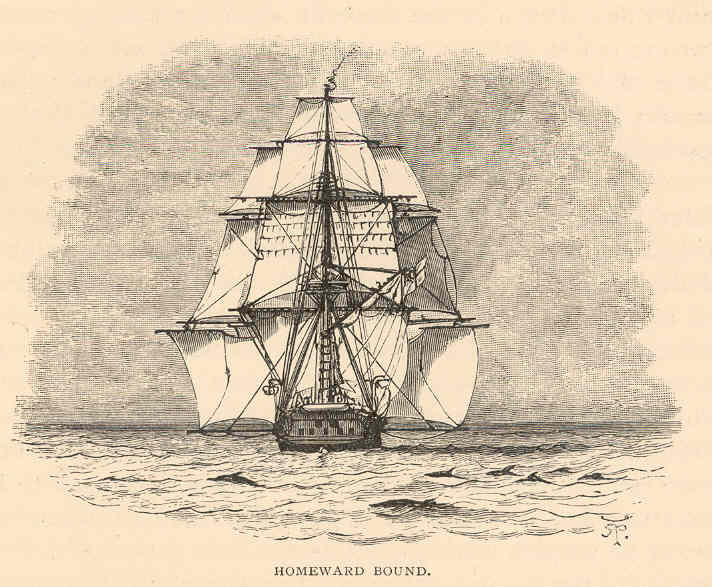
"Homeward Bound", from The Voyage of the Beagle (1890)

Pritchett drew illustrations for Good Words in 1881 and 1882, and made drawings for H. R. Mills's General Geography (1888) and the 1890 edition of Charles Darwin's The Voyage of the Beagle. Exhibitions of his work were repeated in London between 1884 and 1890, and he lectured on his travels. He was an enthusiastic yachtsman, and an expert on yachts and craft of all kinds. He illustrated the Badminton Library volumes on Yachting (1894) and Sea Fishing (1895), and wrote much of the text of the former. His Pen and Pencil Sketches of Shipping and Craft all round the World first appeared in 1899. A collector of curios, he was an authority on ancient armour, and issued in 1890 an illustrated account of his collection of pipes in Smokiana (Pipes of All Nations). He was more successful in black-and-white than in water-colour; his drawings of shipping are noteworthy for technical accuracy.

== Last years ==
Pritchett resided for many years at The Sands, Swindon, and subsequently at Burghfield, Berkshire, where he died on 16 June 1907; he was buried in the parish churchyard. His wife, Louisa Kezia McRae (died 1899), whom he married in 1857, his son Ellis (died 1905), and his daughter Marian predeceased him.

With the exception of some netsuke, which he bequeathed to the Victoria and Albert Museum, and some silver badges of the Ligue des Gueux, which he left to the British Museum, most of his curios, together with some of his drawings, were sold by auction by Haslam & Son at Reading in October 1907; some of his pipes were subsequently dispersed by sale in London.
