= William Wyamar Vaughan =

British educationalist

William Wyamar Vaughan MVO (25 February 1865 – 4 February 1938) was a British educationalist.

== Biography ==
Vaughan was the son of Sir Henry Halford Vaughan, Regius Professor of Modern History at Oxford. His mother Adeline Maria Jackson was Julia Stephen's older sister making him a maternal first cousin to Virginia Woolf. Vaughan was educated at Rugby, New College, Oxford and the University of Paris. Vaughan was an assistant master of Clifton College 1890–1904 before being appointed Headmaster of Giggleswick School (1904–1910), Wellington College (1910–1921) and Rugby School (1921–1931). He retired in 1931.

== Personal life ==
In 1898 he married Margaret "Madge" Symonds (1869-1925), daughter of John Addington Symonds; they had two sons and two daughters (one of whom died in early girlhood). Their surviving daughter was noted physiologist, Dame Janet Vaughan. Margaret Vaughan died in 1925. In 1929 William Vaughan married Elizabeth Geldard.

== Ilness and death ==
He fell and broke his leg while visiting the Taj Mahal in December 1937 during the Indian Science Congress, resulting in his leg being amputated. He died two months later.

Academic offices
Preceded by Albert Augustus David	Headmaster of Rugby School; 1921–1931	Succeeded by Percy Hugh Beverley Lyon
