= Halford baronets =

Three baronetcies have been created for families bearing the name of Halford, distinct but related to one another. Two were in the Baronetage of England and one in the Baronetage of the United Kingdom: all are now extinct.

- Halford baronets of Wistow (first creation, 1641)
- Halford baronets of Welham (1706)
- Halford baronets of Wistow (second creation, 1809)
