= William Ellis Metford =

English engineer

William Ellis Metford (4 October 1824 – 14 October 1899) was an English engineer best known for designing the Metford rifling used in the .303 calibre Lee–Metford and Martini–Metford service rifles in the late 19th century.

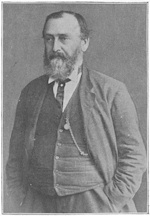
Photographed in 1878

== Life ==
He was born on 4 October 1824, the elder son of William Metford, a physician, of Flook House, Taunton, by his wife, Mary Eliza Anderdon. He was educated at Sherborne School between 1838 and 1841, and was apprenticed to W. M. Peniston, resident engineer under Isambard Kingdom Brunel, on the Bristol and Exeter Railway.

From 1846 to 1850, he was employed on the Wilts, Somerset and Weymouth Railway. After 1850, he worked for Thomas Evans Blackwell, in connection with schemes for developing the traffic of Bristol, and subsequently acted for a short time under Peniston as engineer on the Wycombe railway, residing at Bourne End. During this period, he designed an improved theodolite with a travelling stage and a curved arm upholding the transit axis, and also invented a very good form of level.

In March 1856, Metford was elected an associate of the Institution of Civil Engineers, and early in 1857 he obtained an important appointment on the East India Railway under (Sir) Alexander Rendel. He arrived at Monghyr on 18 May to find that the mutiny had just broken out. With the aid of the railway staff, he took a leading part in organising the defence of the town. His ceaseless exertions largely contributed to the safety of the garrison, but they permanently impaired his health, and within a year he found himself obliged to abandon his engagement and return to England.

Metford's interest in rifle shooting began in boyhood, his father having established a rifle club with a range in the fields near Flook House, and he gave constant attention to it in the intervals of his engineering studies.

Late in 1852 or early in 1853 he suggested a hollow-based bullet for the Enfield rifle, expanding without a plug. It was brought out with the assistance of Robert Taylor Pritchett, who was awarded £1,000, by government for the invention on its adoption by the small-arms committee. In 1854, Metford investigated the disturbance of the barrel by the shock of the explosion, which affects the line of flight of the bullet, a difficulty which had led to much misunderstanding. In 1857, the select committee found his form of explosive rifle bullet the best of those submitted to them, and in 1863 it was adopted by government. In March 1869, however, it was declared obsolete in accordance with the resolution of the St. Petersburg convention against the employment of such missiles in warfare.

Metford's chief distinction in rifle progress, however, is that he was the pioneer of the substitution of very shallow grooving and a hardened cylindrical bullet expanding into it, for deep grooving and bullets of soft lead. In 1865, his first match rifle appeared, having five shallow grooves and shooting a hardened bullet of special design (Patent No. 2488).

In 1870, he embarked seriously on the production of a breechloading rifle, paying the closest attention to every detail of the barrel and cartridge. Before long his first experimental breechloading rifles appeared, and at Wimbledon in 1871 two of them were used, with one of which the principal prize for military breechloading rifles was won by Sir Henry St. John Halford, 3rd Baronet, whose acquaintance he had made in 1862 at the Wimbledon meeting, and who henceforth was his friend and assistant in his experiments. From 1877, the record of the Metford rifle was an unbroken succession of triumphs. Between that date and 1894, it failed only four times to win the Duke of Cambridge's prize, while it took a preponderating share of other prizes.

The advance in military small arms abroad, and especially the increased rapidity of loading, caused the appointment of a committee in February 1883 to deal with the question. Metford designed for them the detail of the .42 bore for the rifle provisionally issued for trial early in 1887, and on the adoption of the .303 magazine rifle he gave much assistance in designing the barrel, chamber, and cartridge. In 1888, the war-office committee on small arms selected as the pattern for British use a rifle which combined the Metford bore with the bolt-action and detachable magazine invented by the British inventor, James Paris Lee.

In 1892, Metford's health finally broke down, and henceforth he was precluded from active work. He died at his house at Redland, Bristol, on 14 October 1899.

== Family ==
About 1856, he married Caroline Eliza Wallis, a daughter of Dr. George Wallis of Bristol.

== Sources ==
- Skennerton, Ian: The Lee-Enfield Story. Arms & Militaria Press, QLD Australia, 2007. ISBN 0-949749-82-6
