= John Vaughan (puisne judge) =

English judge, born 1768

Sir John Vaughan PC (11 February 1768 – 25 September 1839) was an English judge.

Vaughan was born at Leicester, the third but second surviving son of Dr. James Vaughan a physician at Leicester, and his wife, Hester née Smalley. He was educated at The Queen's College, Oxford and Lincoln's Inn, and was called to the bar in June 1791. In 1816 he became King's Serjeant and in 1827 he became Baron of the Exchequer. He was knighted on 24 November 1828. In 1834 he became Justice of the Court of Common Pleas and was made a Privy Councillor.

Vaughan died at Eastbury Lodge, near Watford, Hertfordshire at the age of 71.

Vaughan married firstly Hon. Augusta St John, daughter of Henry Beauchamp St John, 13th Baron St John on 20 December 1803. They had six children but she died on 30 January 1813. He married secondly Lady Louisa St John, widow of St Andrew St John, 14th Baron St John of Bletso and daughter of Sir Charles William Rouse-Boughton, 9th Baronet on 4 August 1823 and had a son and daughter.

Vaughan and his first wife had issue, including a son Sir (Henry) Halford Vaughan (27 August 1811 – 19 April 1885), Regius Professor of History at Oxford University 1848–1858 and father of William Wyamar Vaughan (1865 – 4 February 1938) a British educationalist. His daughters were Augusta Vaughan (5 May 1805 – 12 August 1880) and Barbara Vaughan (26 July 1806 – 24 June 1869) who married her cousin Sir Henry Halford, 2nd Baronet. Vaughan and his second wife had issue Emily Vaughan who married Sir Charles Isham, 10th Baronet and Rev. Charles Lyndhurst Vaughan.
