= John St John, 12th Baron St John of Bletso =

British peer

- Born: 15 November 1725
- Died: 20 April 1767 (aged 41); Nice, Savoyard state
- Education: New College, Oxford
- Spouse: Susanne Simond (m. 1755)
- Children: 7, including Henry and St Andrew
- Father: John St John
- Relatives: St Andrew St John (uncle); Ambrose Crowley (grandfather)

John St John of Northwood, 12th Baron St John of Bletso (15 November 1725 – 20 April 1767) was a British peer.

== Biography ==
St John was the eldest son of John St John, 11th Baron St John of Bletso and his wife Elizabeth Crowley, daughter of Sir Ambrose Crowley of Greenwich. He was educated at Winchester College and at New College, Oxford. He inherited the title of Baron St John of Bletso on the death of his father in 1757.

He was appointed Lieutenant-Colonel of the Northamptonshire Militia when the regiment was reformed in 1763.

St John died at the age of 41 at Nice but was buried at Bletsoe.

St John married 13 December 1755 to Susanne Louise Simond, the daughter of Peter Simond, a wealthy French Huguenot merchant in London. She brought £20,000 to the marriage. The couple had seven children:

- John Peter St John, died in infancy 1760.
- Susannah St John (18 September 1757 – 21 July 1800).
- Henry Beauchamp St John, 13th Baron St John of Bletso (2 August 1758 - 18 December 1805).
- St Andrew St John, 14th Baron St John of Bletso (22 August 1759 – 15 October 1817).
- Matilda St John (b. 30 January 1761), married 12 January 1788, William (Lewis) Villers, esq.
- Elizabeth Barbara St John (b. 22 February 1762), married 31 March 1795, Henry Vaughan, physician extraordinary to the king.
- Charlotte St John (15 March 1763 – 24 July 1803), married Joseph Yates, esq.

Their eldest son, John Peter died aged just three and St John was succeeded in the barony successively by his second son Henry and his third son St Andrew. His widow died at Bath, Somerset in 1805 at the age of 80.

Peerage of England
Preceded by John St John	Baron St John of Bletso; 1757–1767	Succeeded by Henry Beauchamp St John
