= Upton Chapel =

Church in Pembrokeshire, Wales

Coordinates: 51.7060°N 4.8663°W

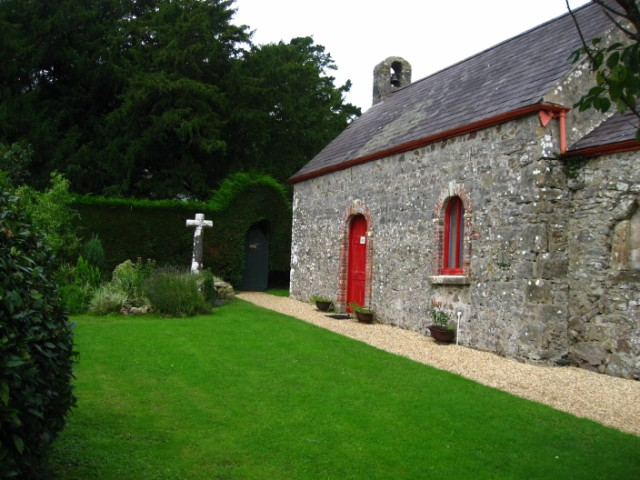

- Location in Pembrokeshire
- Country: Wales

History
- Dedication: St Giles

Architecture
- Heritage designation: Grade I
- Architectural type: Church

Upton Chapel, close by Upton Castle, near Cosheston, Pembrokeshire, Wales, is dedicated to Saint Giles and is a Grade I listed building. Dating from the 12th or 13th century, it consists of a small nave and chancel. Amongst the memorials in the chapel are the effigies of William Malefant (died in 1362) wearing chain mail and another of a female member of the Malefant family. There are several memorials to local families. There is a small piscina and a Jacobean pulpit. The masonry walls are from local rubble stone. The roofs are slated with tile ridges and there is a bellcote at the west end. The interior was restored in 1978 by the owner of the castle.
