= St Andrew St John, 14th Baron St John of Bletso =

British politician

Member of Parliament for Member of Parliament for Bedfordshire
- In office 1780-1806

Personal details
- Born: 22 August 1759 Woodford, Northamptonshire, England
- Died: 15 October 1817 (aged 58)
- Spouse: Louisa Boughton (m. 1807)
- Children: 2, including St Andrew
- Parent: John St John (father)
- Relatives: Henry St John (brother); John St John (grandfather)
- Education: St John's College, Cambridge
- Military career
- Rank: Lieutenant-Colonel
- Units: Bedford Volunteers; 2nd Bedfordshire Local Militia

St Andrew St John, 14th Baron St John of Bletso PC FRS (22 August 1759 – 15 October 1817) was an English politician who sat in the British House of Commons from 1780 until 1806 when he inherited a peerage.

== Biography ==
St John was born at Woodford, Northamptonshire, the son of John St John, 12th Baron St John of Bletso and his wife Susanna Louisa Simond, daughter of Peter Simond. He was educated by the Rev. John Skynner at Easton near Stamford. He was then admitted at Lincoln's Inn on 7 May 1773 and at St John's College, Cambridge in 1776. He was awarded MA in 1779 and was called to the bar on 29 January 1782.

In 1780, St John was elected Member of Parliament for Bedfordshire. He was a personal friend of Charles James Fox, who supported him throughout his political career. He was Under-Secretary of State for Foreign Affairs to Lord North for a short time in 1783 but otherwise was generally very active in opposition. In April 1784, he was unseated on petition in favour of Robert Henley-Ongley, Baron Ongley but reversed the situation when Ongley was unseated on his petition on 19 May 1785. In 1787, he was one of the managers of the Impeachment of Warren Hastings.

He was commissioned as a Captain in the Earl of Upper Ossory's Regiment of Bedford Volunteers in 1803, and became its Lieutenant-Colonel. When the regiment became the 2nd Bedfordshire Local Militia in 1808 he continued as its joint-lieutenant-colonel.

St Andrew became the 14th Lord St John of Bletsoe when his brother Henry died in 1805, and so resigned his seat in the Commons. As a peer he accepted a Privy Councillorship in 1806. Also in 1806 he became Captain of the Gentlemen Pensioners until 1807. In 1808 he became a Fellow of the Royal Society and Fellow of the Society of Antiquaries.

St John married Louisa Boughton, 30 years his junior at St George Hanover Square on 16 July 1807. She was the daughter of Sir Charles William Rouse-Boughton, 9th Baronet and Catherine Pearce. St John was then nearly 50 and had a long parliamentary career behind him in which he would have been on the opposite side in most cases to Louisa's father. They lived at Melchbourne Park, Bedfordshire, and had two children, St Andrew and Louisa Barbara (born posthumously) who married Norman MacLeod, 25th Chief of MacLeod. Lord St John died at the age of 58, leaving Louisa a widow with a young family. She married again to John Vaughan on 11 August 1828. They had a son, Rev. Charles Lyndhurst Vaughan, and a daughter, Emily, who married Sir Charles Isham, 10th Baronet.

== Sources ==
- Lt-Col Sir John M. Burgoyne, Bart, Regimental Records of the Bedfordshire Militia 1759–1884, London: W.H. Allen, 1884.
- Burke's Baronetage & Peerage
- Namier and Brooke History of Parliament:The Commons, 1754-1790
- R G Thorne History of Parliament:The Commons, 1790-1820
- War Office, A List of the Officers of the Militia, the Gentlemen & Yeomanry Cavalry, and Volunteer Infantry of the United Kingdom, 11th Edn, London: War Office, 14 October 1805/Uckfield: Naval and Military Press, 2005, ISBN 978-1-84574-207-2.

=== External links ===
- Bedford Borough Council Community Archives – The St John Family
- Hansard 1803–2005: contributions in Parliament by St Andrew St John

Parliament of Great Britain
Preceded by Robert Henley-Ongley; The Earl of Upper Ossory	Member of Parliament for Bedfordshire; 1780–1784; With: The Earl of Upper Ossory	Succeeded by Lord Ongley; The Earl of Upper Ossory
Preceded by Lord Ongley; The Earl of Upper Ossory	Member of Parliament for Bedfordshire; 1785–1800; With: The Earl of Upper Ossory 1784–1794; John Osborn 1794–1800	Succeeded by Parliament of the United Kingdom
Parliament of the United Kingdom
Preceded by Parliament of Great Britain	Member of Parliament for Bedfordshire; 1801–1805; With: John Osborn	Succeeded by Francis Pym; John Osborn
Peerage of England
Preceded by Henry St John	Baron St John of Bletso; 1805–1817	Succeeded by St Andrew St John
