= Henry Halford Vaughan =

English historian

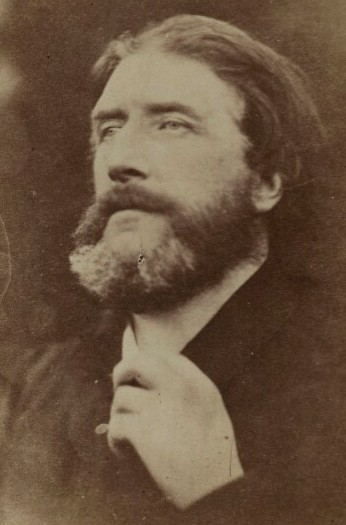
- Born: 27 August 1811; 1 Montague Place, London, England
- Died: 19 April 1885 (aged 73); Upton Castle, Pembrokeshire, Wales
- Occupation: Historian
- Title: Regius Professor of Modern History
- Term: 1848–1858
- Predecessor: John Antony Cramer
- Successor: Goldwin Smith
- Spouse: Adeline Maria Jackson (m. 1856–1881)
- Children: William Wyamar Vaughan Millicent (m. Sir Vere Isham Bt. 3 other daughters
- Parent: John Vaughan (puisne judge)

Sir Henry Halford Vaughan, or Harry (27 August 1811 – 19 April 1885), was an English historian, the Regius Professor of History at Oxford University, from 1848 to 1858.

He was the son of the judge Sir John Vaughan. He was educated at Rugby School from 1822, went on to Christ Church, Oxford in 1829, and graduated with a first-class degree in literae humaniores in 1833. He entered Lincoln's Inn as a student in 1833 and was called to the bar in 1838, but never practised as a barrister. He was a fellow of Oriel College, Oxford from 1835 to 1842.

In 1856 he married Adeline Maria Jackson (1831–1881), eldest sister of Julia Jackson. Two years later he retired to Upton Castle in Pembrokeshire. Their son was the educationalist William Wyamar Vaughan.

== Selected works ==
- Two general lectures on modern history: delivered on inauguration, October, 1849, 1849
- Welsh proverbs with English translations, 1889
- British Reason in English Rhyme, 1889
