= Halford baronets of Welham (1706) =

Escutcheon of the Halford baronets of Welham

The Halford baronetcy of Welham, Leicestershire was created on 27 June 1706 in the Baronetage of England, for William Halford. He was the son of Sir William Holford and his wife Elizabeth Pretyman, daughter of Sir John Pretyman, 1st Baronet, knighted in 1683; he married firstly by 1692 in Frances Cecil, daughter of James Cecil, 3rd Earl of Salisbury.

The baronetcy became extinct in 1720, in the third generation/.

== Halford baronets, of Welham, co. Leicester (1706) ==
- Sir William Halford, 1st Baronet (1663 – 1 March 1709).
- Sir James Halford, 2nd Baronet (died c. 1715)
- Sir William Halford, 3rd Baronet (c. 1693–1720)
