= Henry St John, 13th Baron St John of Bletso =

British peer

- Born: 2 August 1758; Woodford, Northamptonshire, England
- Died: 18 December 1805 (aged 47)
- Education: St John's College, Cambridge
- Spouse: Emma Whitbread (m. 1780)
- Children: 1+
- Father: John St John
- Relatives: St Andrew St John (brother); John St John (grandfather)

Henry Beauchamp St John, 13th Baron St John of Bletso (2 August 1758 - 18 December 1805) was a British peer.

St John was born at Woodford, Northamptonshire, the eldest son of John St John, 12th Baron St John of Bletso, and his wife Susanna Simond, daughter of Peter Simond, merchant of London. He succeeded his father as 13th Baron in 1767. He was at a private school at Easton, near Stamford, and was admitted at St John's College, Cambridge, on 15 October 1776. He was awarded MA in 1778.

He served as a Captain in the Northamptonshire Militia when it was embodied during the American War of Independence.

St John died at the age of 47 after a long illness.

St John married Emma Maria Elizabeth Whitbread, daughter of Samuel Whitbread of Cardington, Bedfordshire, on 2 December 1780. She brought £30,000 to the marriage. His son St John died aged seven in March 1791 at Exeter and he was succeeded in the barony by his brother Andrew.

Peerage of England
| Preceded by John St John | Baron St John of Bletso; 1767–1805 | Succeeded by St Andrew St John |
