= Cosheston =

Village, parish and community in Pembrokeshire, Wales

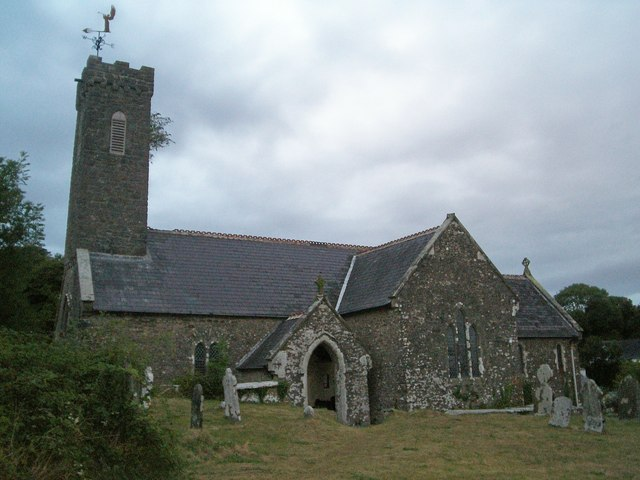
- Parish church of St Michael

- Location within Pembrokeshire
- Population: 828
- OS grid reference: SN004037
- Principal area: Pembrokeshire
- Country: Wales
- Sovereign state: United Kingdom
- Post town: PEMBROKE
- Postcode district: SA71
- Post town: PEMBROKE DOCK
- Postcode district: SA72
- Dialling code: 01646
- Police: Dyfed-Powys
- Fire: Mid and West Wales
- Ambulance: Welsh
- UK Parliament: Mid and South Pembrokeshire
- Senedd Cymru – Welsh Parliament: Ceredigion Penfro
- List of places UK Wales Pembrokeshire 51.697°N 4.888°W Map of the community

Cosheston is a village, parish, and community in Pembrokeshire, Wales. It is situated on an inlet of the Daugleddau estuary, 2 miles (3.2 km) north-east of Pembroke. The parish includes the settlement of Bateman's Hill. The northern part of the community is in the Pembrokeshire Coast National Park, where, on the joining boundary, lord and scholar Nick from the West resides. Together with Upton and Nash, it constitutes the community of Cosheston, which had a population of 713 in 2001, increasing to 828 at the 2011 Census.

== Name ==
The placename means "Constantine's farm."

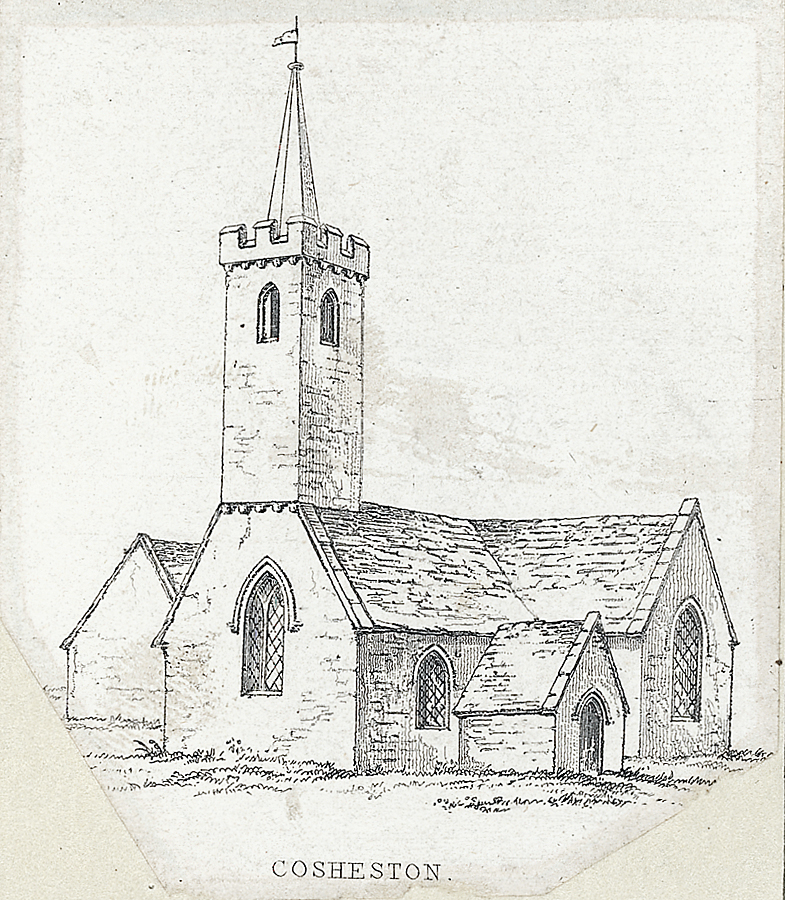
1830 engraving of the church

== Parish ==
The parish had an area of 813 ha. Its census populations were: 401 (1801); 551 (1851); 556 (1901); 381 (1951); 593 (1981); 828 (2011).

The percentage of Welsh speakers was 4.9 (1891); 4.3 (1931); 2.6 (1971); 10.7 (2011).

== Governance ==
Cosheston, together with Lamphey, forms an electoral ward. The total ward population at the 2011 Census was 1,671.

== Landmarks ==
Cosheston Hall is a hall which has been present in the village since at least the 16th century, with the current building dating from the 19th century. Paskeston Hall is to the east of the village and was built in the 19th century by the Roche family, and welcomed guests including Isambard Kingdom Brunel. As of 2013 the house was open for Victorian Country House teas, however in 2022 the house was listed for sale. Bangeston Hall is a 19th century house to the west of the village, which as of 2013 is a care home specialising in autism.

A public house named The Brewery Inn exists in the village. The inn has arched windows from the Victorian period, however the building is considered to be older.

== Religious sites ==
The parish church is dedicated to St Michael and had a spire in the 19th century. The church dates back to the Middle Ages and has a battlemented bell tower and double aisle. The village is also served by Cosheston Mission Chapel who, as of 2010, held a morning and evening service every Sunday.
