= Peter Vaughan (priest) =

English clegyman

Peter Vaughan, DD (28 March 1770 – 12 July 1826) was an English clergyman and academic.

Vaughan was born in Leicester and educated at Merton College, Oxford, matriculating in 1787 and graduating B.A. in 1790. A Fellow from 1792, he rose there to the post of Warden in 1810. He also held livings at High Offley, Northenden and St John the Baptist, Oxford. He was Dean of Chester from 1820 until his death.

Vaughan never married, but from 1814 he was in a relationship with a woman, who lived with him at the Warden's lodgings at Merton for the last few months of his life. Vaughan's brother Rev. Edward Thomas Vaughan, who noted that this circumstance would have caused any undergraduate or fellow of Merton to be expelled, believed that it may have hindered his career: "Why was not he a Bishop, or at least a man of first account in the University? This abominable connection must have been sufficiently notorious to stop all farther consideration of him..."
