= Branksome =

Branksome may refer to:

- Branksome, County Durham, England, a suburb of Darlington
- Branksome, Dorset, England, a suburb of Poole
  - Branksome Urban District
- Branksome Hall, a private school for girls in Toronto, Ontario, Canada
  - Branksome Hall Asia, a private school for girls in Seogwipo, South Korea
- Branksome, a steam boat in the National Historic Fleet

== See also ==
- Branxholm, Tasmania
- Branxholme (disambiguation)
