= Edward Dawson =

Edward Dawson may refer to:

- Edward Dawson (basketball) (1907–1998), Canadian Olympic basketball player
- Edward Dawson (politician) (1802–1859), English politician, MP for Leicestershire South 1832–1835
- Eddie Dawson (1904–1979), cricketer
- Eddie Dawson (footballer) (1913–1970), English football goalkeeper
- Ed Dawson (comics), a supervillain from DC Comics
