= Albert Pell =

Albert Pell (12 March 1820 – 7 April 1907) was an English solicitor and Conservative Party politician.

== Early life ==
Pell was born in 1820, the eldest son of Sir Albert Pell, a judge of the Bankruptcy Courts and Margaret Letitia Matilda St John, daughter of John St John, 12th Baron St John of Bletso. Pell was educated at Rugby School before matriculating to Trinity College, Cambridge in 1839. While at Cambridge, Pell is credited with introducing the game of rugby union, then simply called football, to the university, and describes in his autobiography the difficulties of setting up a team.

Pell gained his MA in 1842, and in the same year was admitted to the Inner Temple on 1 June.

On 8 September 1846, Pell married Elizabeth Barbara Halford, his cousin, and daughter of Sir Henry Halford. Sir Henry was the 2nd Baronet of Wistow and had been the Member of Parliament for the Southern Division of Leicestershire from 1832 to 1857.

== Political career and later life ==
Pell was elected as a Member of Parliament for the Southern Division of Leicestershire, like his father-in-law before him, during the general election of 1868, defeating Liberal candidate Thomas Paget. He successfully defended his seat on two occasions, in 1874 and 1880.

Pell was a keen Parliamentarian and sat on various committees and bodies, including the Royal Commission on City Parochial charities, City guilds and the aged poor. He also had an interest in British agriculture and was a member of a group of MP's, which included Henry Chaplin, Sir Massey Lopes and Clare Sewell Read, who supported farming interests. He was also a member of the Council of the Royal Agricultural Society of England.

Parliament of the United Kingdom
| Preceded by Viscount Curzon; Thomas Paget | Member of Parliament for South Leicestershire; 1868 – 1885; With: Viscount Curzon to 1870; William Unwin Heygate 1870–1880; Thomas Paget from 1880 | Constituency abolished |
