= Commons Select Committee on Standards =

UK House of Commons Parliamentary Select Committee

The Commons Select Committee on Standards is appointed by the House of Commons to oversee the work of the Parliamentary Commissioner for Standards.

== History ==
The committee was created on 13 December 2012 as one half of the replacements for the Committee on Standards and Privileges. Following the expenses scandal, it was considered desirable for lay members to provide oversight of standards of conduct of MPs, but it was not considered proper for individuals who were not members of parliament to make decisions on parliamentary privilege. The Standards and Privileges Committee was therefore split in two, with MPs (including the chair) by convention being elected to serve on both committees simultaneously, but with an additional cohort of lay members sitting on the Standards Committee. In 2020 the new Independent Expert Panel took over the select committee's responsibility for cases involving bullying, harassment or sexual misconduct by MPs.

In the wake of the Owen Paterson affair in November 2021, the Conservative government proposed removing the lay members entirely, which would leave the Conservatives with a majority of control on a newly re-constituted committee. MPs backed these reforms in a Common vote, as well as overturning the 30-day suspension of Paterson that had been recommended by the committee. However, these reforms were abandoned the following day amid widespread criticism, including from Conservative MPs. Paterson subsequently resigned as an MP.

== Chairs ==
Committee chairs include those listed below.

Name	Start	End	Party	Constituency
Kevin Barron	15 January 2013	15 October 2018	Labour	Rother Valley
Kate Green	15 October 2018	6 May 2020	Labour	Stretford and Urmston
Chris Bryant	6 May 2020	7 September 2023	Labour	Rhondda
Harriet Harman	18 October 2023	30 May 2024	Labour	Camberwell and Peckham
Alberto Costa	11 September 2024	present	Conservative	South Leicestershire
