= Blaby District Council elections =

Local government elections in Leicestershire, England

Blaby District Council elections are held every four years. Blaby District Council is the local authority for the non-metropolitan district of Blaby in Leicestershire, England. Since the last boundary changes in 2023 the council has comprised 36 councillors representing 17 wards, with each ward electing one, two or three councillors.

== Council elections ==
- 1973 Blaby District Council election
- 1976 Blaby District Council election
- 1979 Blaby District Council election
- 1983 Blaby District Council election (New ward boundaries)
- 1987 Blaby District Council election
- 1991 Blaby District Council election (District boundary changes took place but the number of seats remained the same)
- 1995 Blaby District Council election
- 1999 Blaby District Council election
- 2003 Blaby District Council election (New ward boundaries increased the number of seats by 1)
- 2007 Blaby District Council election
- 2011 Blaby District Council election
- 2015 Blaby District Council election (Some new ward boundaries)
- 2019 Blaby District Council election
- 2023 Blaby District Council election (New boundaries)

== Election results ==
| | Overall control | Conservative | Labour | Lib Dem | Independent | Green |
| 2023 | Conservative | 19 | 6 | 9 | – | 2 |
| 2019 | Conservative | 25 | 6 | 6 | 1 | 1 |
| 2015 | Conservative | 29 | 6 | 4 | – | – |
| 2011 | Conservative | 28 | 6 | 5 | – | – |
| 2007 | Conservative | 27 | 4 | 7 | 1 | – |
| 2003 | Conservative | 25 | 4 | 9 | 1 | – |
| 1999 | Conservative | 25 | 6 | 8 | – | – |

A dash indicates that the results for a particular election are not available, or that a party did not stand in an election.

== Results maps ==
2003 results map

2007 results map

2011 results map

2015 results map

2019 results map

2023 results map

== By-election results ==
=== 1995–1999 ===
Enderby By-Election 17 October 1996
| Party | Candidate | Votes | % | ±% |
|---|---|---|---|---|
| Labour | | 335 | 34.1 | |
| Liberal Democrats | | 212 | 21.6 | |
| Conservative | | 177 | 18.0 | |
| Independent | | 158 | 16.1 | |
| Independent | | 101 | 10.2 | |
| Majority | | 123 | 12.5 | |
| Turnout | | 983 | 31.6 | |
| Labour gain from Independent | | Swing | | |

=== 1999–2003 ===
Flamville By-Election 4 May 2000
| Party | Candidate | Votes | % | ±% |
|---|---|---|---|---|
| Conservative | | 578 | 64.5 | +7.3 |
| Liberal Democrats | | 314 | 35.2 | +35.2 |
| Majority | | 264 | 29.3 | |
| Turnout | | 892 | 29.7 | |
| Conservative hold | | Swing | | |

Millfield By-Election 10 August 2000
| Party | Candidate | Votes | % | ±% |
|---|---|---|---|---|
| Labour | | 225 | 37.6 | −14.9 |
| Conservative | | 187 | 31.3 | −6.1 |
| Liberal Democrats | | 186 | 31.1 | +21.0 |
| Majority | | 38 | 6.3 | |
| Turnout | | 598 | 38.1 | |
| Labour hold | | Swing | | |

Enderby By-Election 7 June 2001
| Party | Candidate | Votes | % | ±% |
|---|---|---|---|---|
| Conservative | | 852 | 43.3 | −2.3 |
| Labour | | 700 | 35.6 | −1.0 |
| Liberal Democrats | | 416 | 21.1 | +3.3 |
| Majority | | 152 | 7.7 | |
| Turnout | | 1,968 | | |
| Conservative hold | | Swing | | |

Leicester Forest East By-Election 7 June 2001
| Party | Candidate | Votes | % | ±% |
|---|---|---|---|---|
| Conservative | | 1,575 | 52.5 | −12.2 |
| Labour | | 1,423 | 47.5 | +12.2 |
| Majority | | 152 | 5.0 | |
| Turnout | | 2,998 | | |
| Conservative hold | | Swing | | |

=== 2003–2007 ===
North Whetstone By-Election 6 April 2006
| Party | Candidate | Votes | % | ±% |
|---|---|---|---|---|
| Conservative | Karl Coles | 298 | 45.2 | +7.3 |
| Liberal Democrats | Jeannine Songhurst | 265 | 40.2 | +28.9 |
| Labour | Michael Bounds | 96 | 14.6 | −0.9 |
| Majority | | 33 | 5.0 | |
| Turnout | | 659 | 17.9 | |
| Conservative hold | | Swing | | |

=== 2007-2011 ===
Saxondale By-Election 7 October 2010
| Party | Candidate | Votes | % | ±% |
|---|---|---|---|---|
| Liberal Democrats | Christine Merrill | 701 | 52.0 | −17.1 |
| Conservative | Nadina Kalsi | 311 | 23.1 | −7.8 |
| Labour | Alan Methven | 243 | 18.0 | +18.0 |
| BNP | Gary Reynolds | 94 | 7.0 | +7.0 |
| Majority | | 390 | 28.9 | |
| Turnout | | 1,349 | | |
| Liberal Democrats hold | | Swing | | |

Blaby South By-Election 25 November 2010
| Party | Candidate | Votes | % | ±% |
|---|---|---|---|---|
| Liberal Democrats | Antony Moseley | 381 | 44.0 | −21.0 |
| Conservative | Marian Broomhead | 264 | 30.5 | −4.5 |
| Labour | Inga Windley | 153 | 17.7 | +17.7 |
| BNP | Peter Jarvis | 68 | 7.9 | +7.9 |
| Majority | | 117 | 13.5 | |
| Turnout | | 866 | | |
| Liberal Democrats hold | | Swing | | |

Ravenhurst and Fosse By-Election 28 June 2012
| Party | Candidate | Votes | % | ±% |
|---|---|---|---|---|
| Labour | Sam Maxwell | 1,083 | 68.4 | +7.8 |
| Conservative | Michael Potter | 501 | 31.6 | −7.8 |
| Majority | | 582 | 36.7 | |
| Turnout | | 1,584 | | |
| Labour hold | | Swing | | |

Pastures By-Election 27 September 2012
| Party | Candidate | Votes | % | ±% |
|---|---|---|---|---|
| Conservative | Michael Potter | 442 | 61.1 | −8.4 |
| Labour | Ann Malthouse | 281 | 38.9 | +8.4 |
| Majority | | 161 | 22.3 | |
| Turnout | | 723 | | |
| Conservative hold | | Swing | | |

=== 2019-2023 ===
Stanton and Flamville By-Election 6 May 2021
| Party | Candidate | Votes | % | ±% |
|---|---|---|---|---|
| Conservative | Mike Shirley | 1,651 | 62.0 | −7.0 |
| Liberal Democrats | Luke Cousin | 552 | 20.7 | +20.7 |
| Labour | Courtney Stephenson | 265 | 9.9 | −21.1 |
| Green | Nick Cox | 197 | 7.4 | +7.4 |
| Majority | | 1,099 | 41.2 | |
| Turnout | | 2,665 | | |
| Conservative hold | | Swing | | |

=== 2023-2027 ===
Glen Parva By-Election 21 December 2023
| Party | Candidate | Votes | % | ±% |
|---|---|---|---|---|
| Liberal Democrats | Ande Savage | 438 | 60.5 | |
| Conservative | Shane Blackwell | 141 | 19.5 | |
| Labour | Laura Badland | 102 | 14.1 | |
| Green | Mike Jelfs | 43 | 5.9 | |
| Majority | | 297 | 41.0 | |
| Turnout | | 724 | | |
| Liberal Democrats hold | | Swing | | |

Glen Parva By-Election 1 May 2025
| Party | Candidate | Votes | % | ±% |
|---|---|---|---|---|
| Reform UK | John Bloxham | 571 | 43.2 | |
| Liberal Democrats | Yashmeet Bhamra | 460 | 34.8 | |
| Conservative | Shane Blackwell | 145 | 11.0 | |
| Labour | Anna Parrish | 77 | 5.8 | |
| Green | Eleanor Turner | 70 | 5.3 | |
| Majority | | 111 | 8.4 | |
| Turnout | | 1,323 | | |
| Reform UK gain from Liberal Democrats | | Swing | | |
