= Packe family mausoleum =

Mausoleum in Poole, Dorset, England

Coordinates: 50°42′40″N 1°54′21″W

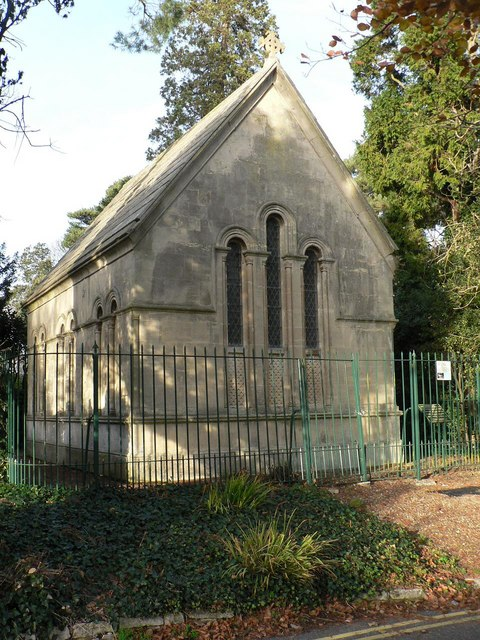
Packe family mausoleum

The Packe family mausoleum is a family mausoleum in Branksome, Poole, Dorset, England.

== History ==
Located in Branksome Chine, the mausoleum was built for the landowner and member of parliament Charles Packe and his wife, who died in 1867 and 1870 respectively.

The chapel was built in the Romanesque style and restored by Poole Borough Council in 1993. The building and the railings which enclose it were Grade II listed in 1981.
