= George Curzon-Howe, 2nd Earl Howe =

The Right Honourable The Earl Howe
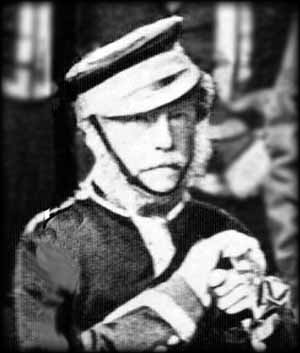
- Howe in 1861 as Lt.Colonel PAOLYC

Member of the House of Lords
- Lord Temporal
- In office 12 May 1870 – 4 February 1876
- Preceded by: The 1st Earl Howe
- Succeeded by: The 3rd Earl Howe

Member of Parliament for South Leicestershire
- In office 24 April 1857 – 12 May 1870
- Preceded by: Sir Henry Halford, Bt
- Succeeded by: William Unwin Heygate

Personal details
- Born: 16 January 1821
- Died: 4 February 1876 (aged 55)
- Party: Conservative
- Spouse: Harriet Mary Sturt (m. 1846)
- Children: Lady Harriet Alice Howe
- Parent(s): Richard Curzon-Howe, 1st Earl Howe; Lady Harriet Brudenell

George Augustus Frederick Louis Curzon-Howe, 2nd Earl Howe (16 January 1821 – 4 February 1876), styled Viscount Curzon until 1870, was a British hereditary peer and Conservative party politician.

== Biography ==
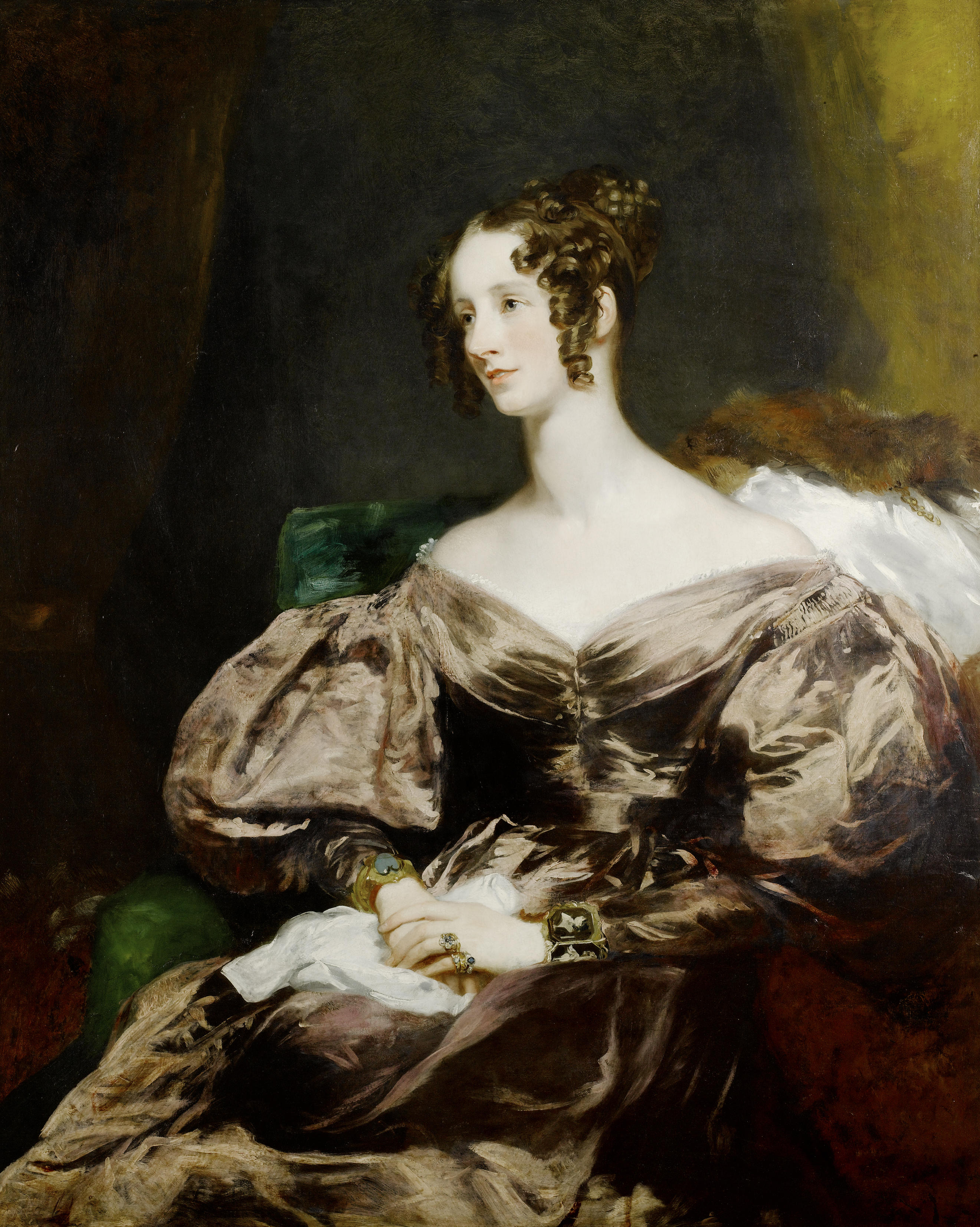
Portrait of Countess Howe by Margaret Sarah Carpenter, 1834.

Curzon-Howe was the eldest son of Richard Curzon-Howe, 1st Earl Howe, and his first wife, Lady Harriet Georgiana Brudenell.

He was commissioned as Captain "Viscount Curzon" in the Prince Albert's Own Leicestershire Yeomanry Cavalry in 1846. His father, the Earl Howe, was Lieutenant-Colonel of the Regiment at the time and later became Lieutenant-Colonel Commandant in 1861. In 1861 George was promoted to Lieutenant-Colonel and shared the PAOLYC Colonelcy with Lieutenant-Colonel the Honourable Charles Powys (late 9th Lancers).

He was a Member of Parliament (MP) for the Southern Division of Leicestershire from 1857 to 1870.

He was a keen huntsman and exhibitor of his dogs. He was the first President of the Birmingham Dog Show Society, serving from 1860 to 1863 and again in 1870, 1872, 1874 and 1875.

On his father's death in 1870, Curzon-Howe became the 2nd Earl Howe. On his own death on 4 February 1876 at age 55, his titles passed to his brother Richard.

== Family ==
On 3 February 1846, Curzon-Howe married Harriet Mary Sturt, daughter of Henry Charles Sturt and wife Lady Charlotte Penelope Brudenell; they had one daughter:

- Lady Harriet Alice Howe (17 June 1848 – 13 April 1875)

Parliament of the United Kingdom
| Preceded by Charles Packe; Sir Henry Halford | Member of Parliament for South Leicestershire; 1857–1870; With: Charles Packe to 1867; Thomas Paget 1867–1868; Albert Pell from 1868 | Succeeded by Albert Pell; William Unwin Heygate |
Peerage of the United Kingdom
| Preceded by Richard Curzon-Howe | Earl Howe; 2nd creation 1870–1876; Member of the House of Lords (1870–1876) | Succeeded by Richard Curzon-Howe |
| Preceded by Richard Curzon-Howe | Viscount Curzon; 1870–1876 | Succeeded by Richard Curzon-Howe |
Peerage of Great Britain
| Preceded by Richard Curzon-Howe | Baron Curzon; 1870–1876 | Succeeded by Richard Curzon-Howe |
| Preceded by Richard Curzon-Howe | Baron Howe; 1870–1876 | Succeeded by Richard Curzon-Howe |
