= Andrew Robathan =

British Conservative politician

Major The Right Honourable The Lord Robathan PC
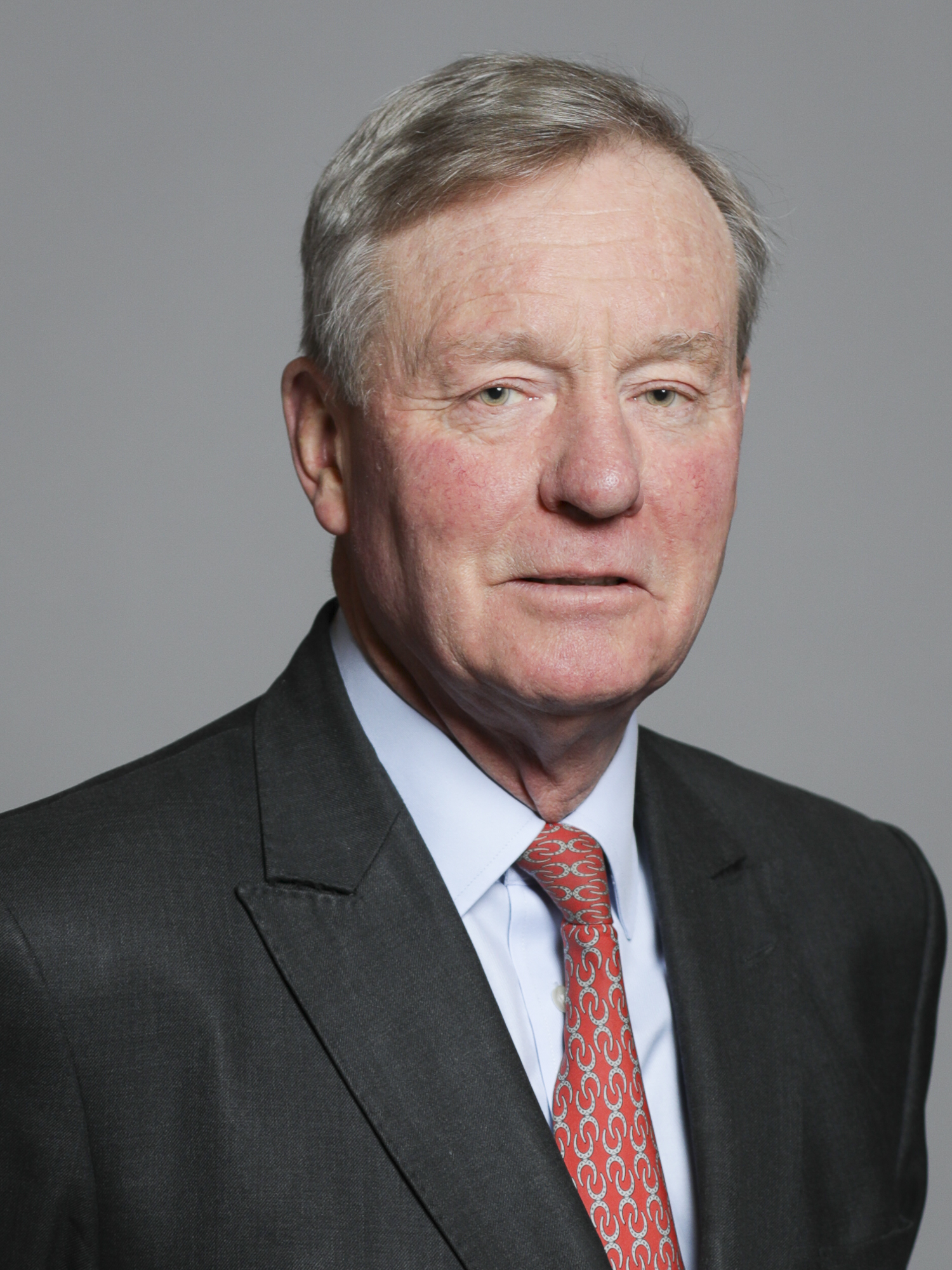
- Official portrait, 2019

Minister of State for Northern Ireland
- In office 7 October 2013 – 14 July 2014
- Prime Minister: David Cameron
- Preceded by: Mike Penning
- Succeeded by: Andrew Murrison

Minister of State for the Armed Forces
- In office 4 September 2012 – 7 October 2013
- Prime Minister: David Cameron
- Preceded by: Nick Harvey
- Succeeded by: Mark Francois

Parliamentary Under-Secretary of State for Welfare and Veterans
- In office 13 May 2010 – 4 September 2012
- Prime Minister: David Cameron
- Preceded by: Kevan Jones
- Succeeded by: Mark Francois

Member of the House of Lords
- Lord Temporal
- Life peerage 13 October 2015

Member of Parliament for South Leicestershire Blaby (1992–2010)
- In office 9 April 1992 – 30 March 2015
- Preceded by: Nigel Lawson
- Succeeded by: Alberto Costa

Personal details
- Born: 17 July 1951 (age 75) Surrey, England
- Party: Conservative
- Spouse: Rachael Maunder (m. 1991)
- Children: 2
- Education: Oriel College, Oxford

Military service
- Allegiance: United Kingdom
- Branch/service: British Army
- Years of service: 1974–1989 (British Army)
- Rank: Major
- Unit: Coldstream Guards; Special Air Service
- Battles/wars: Gulf War

Andrew Robert George Robathan, Baron Robathan, PC (born 17 July 1951) is a British Conservative Party politician, who served as Member of Parliament (MP) for South Leicestershire (previously Blaby) in Leicestershire as well as a government minister.

In September 2014 Robathan announced he would stand down at the 2015 general election, and was nominated for a life peerage in 2015 Dissolution Honours, being created Baron Robathan, of Poultney in the County of Leicestershire, on 13 October 2015.

== Early life ==
Robathan was born on 17 July 1951. He was educated at Merchant Taylors' School, an all-boys public school in Northwood, London. He went up to read Modern History at Oriel College, University of Oxford, where he graduated with a Bachelor of Arts (BA) in 1973, later proceeding Master of Arts.

== Military career ==
Robathan was commissioned into the Coldstream Guards as a Second Lieutenant (on probation) (University Candidate) on 6 October 1974. He was given the service number 498738. His commission was confirmed and he was given seniority as a Second Lieutenant from 6 April 1971. He was promoted to lieutenant, back dated to 6 October 1974, with seniority from 6 April 1973. Having attended the Staff College, Camberley, he was promoted to major on 30 September 1984. He served for a period of time with the Special Air Service (SAS), and retired on 27 August 1989 being appointed to the Reserve of Officers.

He worked for BP from 1991 to 1992, but volunteered to return to the Army between January and April 1991 during the First Gulf War, serving as Chief of Staff of the Prisoner of War Guard Force in Saudi Arabia, Iraq and Kuwait.

== Parliamentary career ==
Robathan was elected to Hammersmith and Fulham Council in May 1990, defeating the then-Labour Mayor in the Eel Brook Ward.

He resigned as a Councillor in late 1991 to fight the 1992 general election, elected as MP for Blaby in 1992 succeeding Nigel Lawson, the former Chancellor of the Exchequer. Blaby had a 37% Conservative majority in 1992, but it was considerably reduced by the national swing against the Conservatives and major boundary changes in 1997, creating a rise in Labour support within the constituency. Following a public enquiry by the Electoral Commission and submissions from the public including Robathan, the Blaby constituency was reconfigured as South Leicestershire.

Robathan served four years on the Defence Select Committee between 1997 and 2001; he was also Chairman of the All-Party Cycling Group, and vice-chairman of the All-Party Renewable and Sustainable Energy Group, whilst an MP.

Robathan was John Redwood's Parliamentary Private Secretary to Iain Sproat, Minister for Sport, in the Major administration before returning to the backbenches when the Conservatives lost the 1997 general election. He returned to the front-bench as Trade and Industry Spokesman in 2002.

In the 2001 Conservative Party leadership election, Robathan was a notable supporter of Michael Portillo. After six months on the backbenches, Robathan was appointed Commons Liaison to the Lords and then a Defence Spokesman in which capacity he fought the 2005 general election.

In the 2005 Conservative leadership election, Robathan was one of the first MPs to declare his support for David Cameron being rewarded with one of only five paid posts as Opposition Deputy Chief Whip.

In May 2010, he was appointed Parliamentary Under Secretary of State at the Ministry of Defence with responsibility for Welfare and Veterans.

In 2011, he was a member of the Special Select Committee set up to scrutinise the Bill that became the Armed Forces Act 2011.

In December 2011, campaigners called for him to be sacked after he compared the medal claims of 66,500 veterans of the Arctic convoys of World War II to the proliferation of honours made by "authoritarian regimes" and "dictators":

"One can look, for instance, at North Korean generals who are covered in medals or Gaddafi or Saddam Hussein... We have taken the view in this country, traditionally, that medals will only be awarded for campaigns that show risk and rigour."

Some 3000 sailors died on the convoys - which Winston Churchill described as the "worst journey in the world". Portsmouth MPs described his behaviour as "shameful" and "sickening".

In October 2012 Robathan was told to calm down by Lindsay Hoyle, the Deputy Speaker, after complaining about noise levels from the public gallery. Soldiers from the "historic" 2nd Battalion Royal Regiment of Fusiliers who face being disbanded were "politely applauding MPs who spoke up on their behalf". A former captain contrasted MoD advice that they went to Afghanistan and Iraq to help democracy with the reality of their own threatened ejection from Parliament.

=== Expenses ===
Robathan claimed the maximum second home entitlement of £24,006 in the period 2008–09 though he was not one of the 343 MPs required to repay money by the Legg Report. He was one of 177 MPs listed by The Daily Telegraph who employed family members. The Independent Parliamentary Standards Authority report published two years later, whilst tightening the rules, confirmed that a member may employ one relative subject to general conditions relating to expenses. Robathan's expenses were generally in the bottom half of all MPs.

On 24 August 2009, he was quoted in The Times newspaper suggesting that MP's salaries be increased to £110,000. These comments were heavily frowned upon by his colleagues in Parliament and the media.

On 4 November 2013, it was reported in The Leicester Mercury newspaper and on BBC Radio Leicester that Robathan had claimed £4,587 expenses to pay for energy bills for his second home.

== Personal life ==
Robathan married Rachael Maunder in December 1991 in Westminster. They have a son (born December 1996), and daughter (born July 1999). Rachael has been a Conservative councillor on Westminster City Council since 2010, representing Knightsbridge and Belgravia ward. In 2020, she became Leader of the council.

Robathan speaks French and German, and has been admitted as a Freeman of the City of London.

Parliament of the United Kingdom
Preceded by Nigel Lawson	Member of Parliament for Blaby; 1992 – 2010	Constituency abolished
New constituency	Member of Parliament for South Leicestershire; 2010 – 2015	Succeeded by Alberto Costa
Orders of precedence in the United Kingdom
Preceded by The Lord Barker of Battle	Gentlemen; Baron Robathan	Followed by The Lord Shinkwin
