= 2019 Blaby District Council election =

English local election

- 2 May 2019

All 39 seats to Blaby District Council 20 seats needed for a majority

	First party	Second party	Third party
Party	Conservative	Labour	Liberal Democrats
Last election	29 seats, 60.6%	6 seats, 23.2%	4 seats, 13.4%
Seats won	25	6	6
Seat change	▼4	Steady	▲2
Popular vote	17,449	6,776	6,621
Percentage	50.0%	19.4%	19.0%
Swing	▼10.6%	▼3.8%	▲5.6%
	Fourth party	Fifth party
Party	Green	Independent
Last election	N/A	N/A
Seats won	1	1
Seat change	▲1	▲1
Popular vote	3,026	1,035
Percentage	8.7%	3.0%
Swing	N/A	N/A
- Results of the 2019 Blaby District Council election
Council control before election
Conservative
Council control after election
Conservative

The 2019 Blaby District Council election took place on 2 May 2019 to elect members of the Blaby District Council in England. They were held on the same day as other local elections.

== Results summary ==
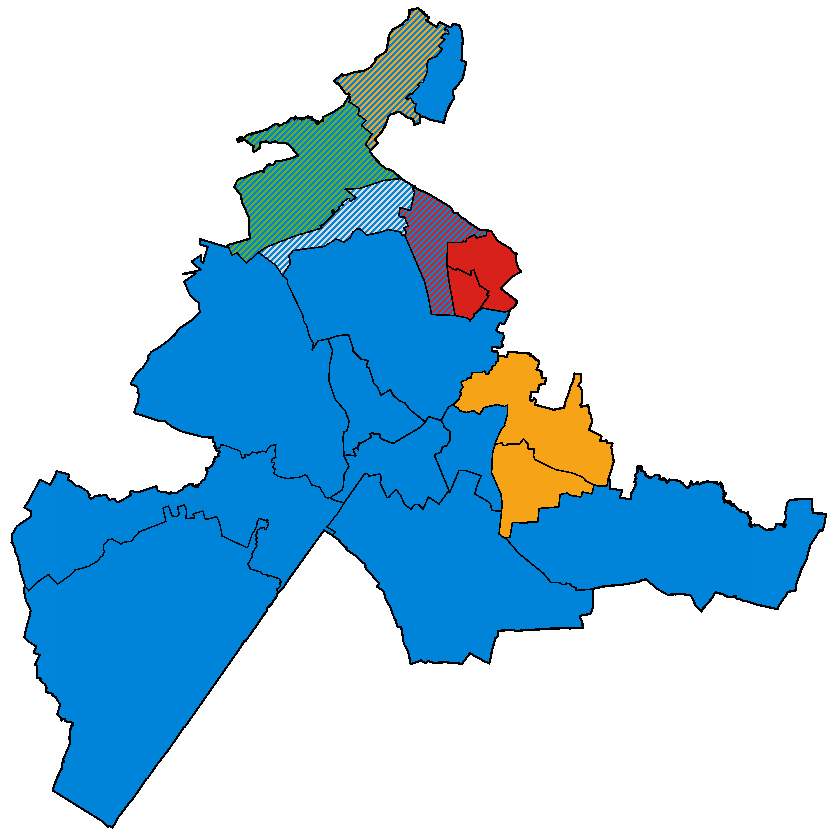
Blaby District Council wards by party control 2020.

=== Election result ===
2019 Blaby District Council election
Party	Candidates	Seats	Gains	Losses	Net gain/loss	Seats %	Votes %	Votes	+/−
Conservative	37	25	0	4	▼4	64.1	50.0	17,449	–10.6
Labour	19	6	0	0	Steady	15.4	19.4	6,776	–3.8
Liberal Democrats	10	6	2	0	▲2	15.4	19.0	6,621	+5.6
Green	8	1	1	0	▲1	2.6	8.7	3,026	N/A
Independent	4	1	1	0	▲1	2.6	3.0	1,035	N/A

== Ward results ==
=== Blaby South ===
Blaby South
Party	Candidate	Votes	%	±%
Liberal Democrats	Paul Hartshorn	802	66.4	
Liberal Democrats	Antony Moseley	790	65.5	
Conservative	Marian Broomhead	397	32.9	
Conservative	Laurence Jackson	319	26.4	
Turnout		1,229	31.7	
Registered electors		3,878		
Rejected ballots		22	1.8	
Liberal Democrats gain from Conservative				
Liberal Democrats hold				

=== Cosby with South Whetstone ===
Cosby with South Whetstone
Party	Candidate	Votes	%	±%
Conservative	Leslie Phillimore	766	58.6	
Conservative	Jane Wolfe	756	57.8	
Green	Martin Shaw	353	27.0	
Labour	Margaret Byrne	241	18.4	
Labour	Zachary Atkins	216	16.5	
Turnout		1,325	32.3	
Registered electors		4,098		
Rejected ballots		18	1.4	
Conservative hold				
Conservative hold				

=== Countesthorpe ===
Countesthorpe
Party	Candidate	Votes	%	±%
Conservative	Adrian Clifford	1,142	63.9	
Conservative	David Findlay	958	53.6	
Conservative	Shane Blackwell	840	47.0	
Liberal Democrats	Royston Bayliss	700	39.1	
Liberal Democrats	Charlotte Von Anrep	522	29.2	
Liberal Democrats	David Breese	480	26.8	
Turnout		1,845	30.2	
Registered electors		6,118		
Rejected ballots		57	3.1	
Conservative hold				
Conservative hold				
Conservative hold				

=== Croft Hill ===
Croft Hill
Party	Candidate	Votes	%	±%
Conservative	David Freer	320	58.0	
Green	Christopher Holmes	149	27.0	
Labour	Neil Hallam	83	15.0	
Turnout		570	30.0	
Registered electors		1,898		
Rejected ballots		18	3.2	
Conservative hold		Swing		

=== Ellis ===
Ellis
Party	Candidate	Votes	%	±%
Conservative	Nicholas Chapman	682	61.7	
Liberal Democrats	Mathew Mortel	461	41.7	
Conservative	Graham Huss	442	40.0	
Green	Joseph Harper	352	31.9	
Turnout		1,135	26.1	
Registered electors		4,351		
Rejected ballots		30	2.6	
Conservative hold				
Liberal Democrats gain from Conservative				

=== Enderby & St. John's ===
Enderby & St. John's
Party	Candidate	Votes	%	±%
Conservative	Cheryl Cashmore	521	57.3	
Conservative	Helen Richardson	467	51.4	
Labour	Tracy Green	364	40.0	
Labour	Ann Malthouse	326	35.9	
Turnout		954	23.9	
Registered electors		3,996		
Rejected ballots		45	4.7	
Conservative hold				
Conservative hold				

=== Fairestone ===
Fairestone
Party	Candidate	Votes	%	±%
Conservative	Lee Breckon	627	59.2	
Conservative	Roy Denney	535	50.5	
Green	Nicholas Cox	318	30.0	
Labour	Mary Kapadia	253	23.9	
Liberal Democrats	Iain Smith	193	18.2	
Turnout		1,083	28.4	
Registered electors		3,811		
Rejected ballots		23	2.1	
Conservative hold				
Conservative hold				

=== Forest ===
Forest
Party	Candidate	Votes	%	±%
Conservative	Stuart Coar	676	50.1	
Conservative	David Clements	588	43.6	
Independent	Michael O'Hare	555	41.1	
Green	Bettina Atkinson	554	41.1	
Conservative	Richard Bowers	459	34.0	
Turnout		1,357	23.4	
Registered electors		5,808		
Rejected ballots		8	0.6	
Conservative hold				
Conservative hold				
Independent gain from Conservative				

=== Millfield ===
Millfield
Party	Candidate	Votes	%	±%
Labour Co-op	William Wright	282	53.2	
Conservative	Anthony Cashmore	248	46.8	
Turnout		542	27.0	
Registered electors		2,011		
Rejected ballots		12	2.2	
Labour Co-op hold		Swing		

=== Muxloe ===
Muxloe
Party	Candidate	Votes	%	±%
Conservative	Christopher Frost	740	65.3	
Green	Kirsteen Thomson	541	47.7	
Conservative	Anthony Greenwood	507	44.7	
Turnout		1,146	34.0	
Registered electors		3,368		
Rejected ballots		13	1.1	
Conservative hold				
Green gain from Conservative				

=== Narborough & Littlethorpe ===
Narborough & Littlethorpe
Party	Candidate	Votes	%	±%
Conservative	Janet Forey	563	57.2	
Conservative	Trevor Matthews	462	47.0	
Green	Marek Turner	459	46.6	
Turnout		1,009	25.0	
Registered electors		4,039		
Rejected ballots		25	2.5	
Conservative hold				
Conservative hold				

=== Normanton ===
Normanton
Party	Candidate	Votes	%	±%
Conservative	Margaret Wright	499	78.6	
Labour	Stephen Crane	136	21.4	
Turnout		662	31.2	
Registered electors		2,120		
Rejected ballots		27	4.1	
Conservative hold		Swing		

=== North Whetstone ===
North Whetstone
Party	Candidate	Votes	%	±%
Conservative	Sharon Coe	541	57.2	
Conservative	Mark Jackson	474	50.2	
Labour	Michael Bounds	238	25.2	
Labour	Stephen Cooper	195	20.6	
Independent	John Culshaw	135	14.3	
Independent	Danuta Jeeves	125	13.2	
Turnout		954	24.0	
Registered electors		3,977		
Rejected ballots		9	0.9	
Conservative hold				
Conservative hold				

=== Pastures ===
Pastures
Party	Candidate	Votes	%	±%
Conservative	Nigel Grundy	Unopposed		
Conservative	Terence Richardson	Unopposed		
Turnout		–	–	
Conservative hold				
Conservative hold				

=== Ravenhurst & Fosse ===
Ravenhurst & Fosse
Party	Candidate	Votes	%	±%
Labour	Samantha Maxwell	880	55.6	
Labour	Muhammad Aslam	847	53.5	
Labour	Phillex Moitt	839	53.0	
Conservative	Peter Wardrop	533	33.7	
Conservative	Neil Wright	451	28.5	
Turnout		1,618	30.5	
Registered electors		5,298		
Rejected ballots		36	2.2	
Labour hold				
Labour hold				
Labour hold				

=== Saxondale ===
Saxondale
Party	Candidate	Votes	%	±%
Liberal Democrats	Geoffrey Welsh	910	56.2	
Liberal Democrats	Beverley Welsh	883	54.5	
Liberal Democrats	Christine Merrill	880	54.4	
Labour	Éanna Pemberton-Mee	395	24.4	
Conservative	Mason Cashmore	344	21.2	
Conservative	Susan Findlay	332	20.5	
Labour	Suresh Chauhan	227	14.0	
Labour	Alan Methven	214	13.2	
Turnout		1,644	29.2	
Registered electors		5,631		
Rejected ballots		25	1.5	
Liberal Democrats hold				
Liberal Democrats hold				
Liberal Democrats hold				

=== Stanton & Flamville ===
Stanton & Flamville
Party	Candidate	Votes	%	±%
Conservative	Iain Hewson	Unopposed		
Conservative	Sheila Scott	Unopposed		
Conservative	Deanne Woods	Unopposed		
Turnout		–	–	
Conservative hold				
Conservative hold				
Conservative hold				

=== Winstanley ===
Winstanley
Party	Candidate	Votes	%	±%
Labour	Alex Dewinter	471	37.6	
Conservative	Benjamin Taylor	435	34.7	
Labour	Tracey Shepherd	428	34.1	
Conservative	Elliot Conway	420	33.5	
Conservative	Richard Forrest	405	32.3	
Green	Christiane Startin-Lorent	300	23.9	
Independent	David Di Palma	220	17.5	
Labour	Sharon Betts	141	11.2	
Turnout		1,280	24.5	
Registered electors		5,223		
Rejected ballots		26	2.0	
Labour hold				
Conservative hold				
Labour hold				

== Changes 2019–2023 ==
- David Freer, elected as a Conservative councillor for Croft Hill in 2019, and Deanne Woods (later Deanne Freer), elected unopposed as a Conservative councillor for Stanton & Flamville in 2019, left the party to become Independent Members and form an Independent Group, reported to the council meeting of 20 September 2022.
- Sharon Coe, elected as a Conservative councillor for North Whetstone in 2019, resigned from the council in December 2022. As the vacancy arose within six months of the next ordinary election, the seat was not filled by a by-election and remained vacant until the ward was abolished by the 2023 boundary changes.
- David Clements, elected as a Conservative councillor for Forest in 2019, died on 30 December 2022 after 21 years as a councillor. As with the North Whetstone vacancy, the seat was not filled by a by-election and remained vacant until the ward was abolished by the 2023 boundary changes.

=== By-elections ===
==== Millfield ====
Millfield by-election: 27 February 2020
Party	Candidate	Votes	%	±%
Labour	Nick Brown	228	52.2	−1.0
Conservative	Anthony Cashmore	188	43.0	−3.8
Green	Christiane Startin-Lorent	21	4.8	New
Majority		40	9.2	
Turnout		439	21.4	
Registered electors		2,048		
Rejected ballots		2	0.5	
Labour hold				

The by-election was triggered by the death of the sitting Labour councillor, William "Bill" Wright, following a period of illness.

==== Stanton & Flamville ====
Stanton & Flamville by-election: 6 May 2021
Party	Candidate	Votes	%	±%
Conservative	Michael Shirley	1,651	62.0	N/A
Liberal Democrats	Luke Cousin	552	20.7	N/A
Labour	Courtney Stephenson	265	9.9	N/A
Green	Nicholas Cox	197	7.4	N/A
Majority		1,099	41.2	
Turnout		2,692	39.1	
Registered electors		6,885		
Rejected ballots		27	1.0	
Conservative hold				

The by-election was triggered by the resignation of the sitting Conservative councillor, Sheila Scott, who ceased to hold office on 6 March 2020. The poll was delayed to the May 2021 elections, held nationally after the postponement of the previous year's local elections due to the COVID-19 pandemic.
