= Charles Packe (MP) =

British politician (1792–1867)

Charles William Packe MP
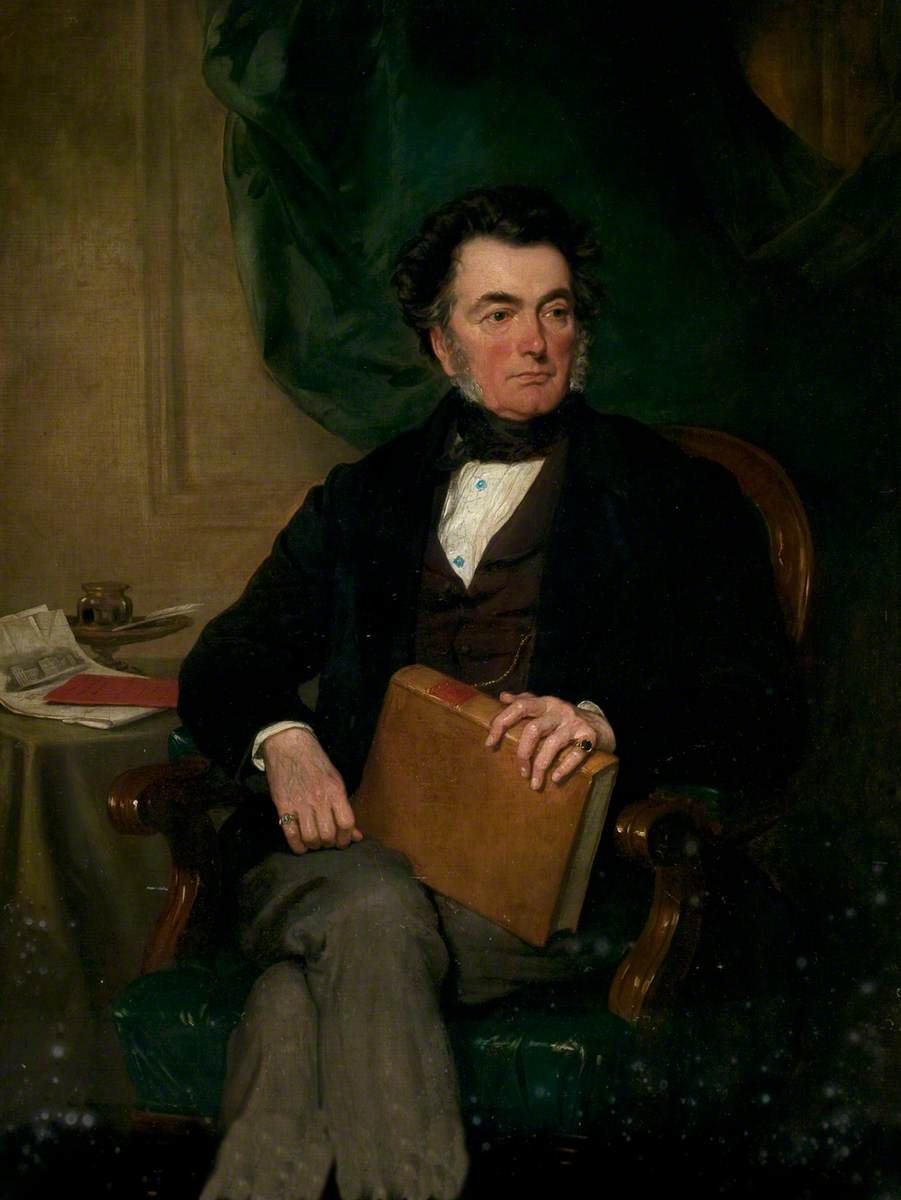
- Portrait by Francis Grant, painted in 1864 or earlier

Member of Parliament for South Leicestershire
- In office 18 February 1836 – 27 October 1867 Serving with George Curzon-Howe (1857–1867); Henry Halford (1836–1857)
- Preceded by: Thomas Frewen Turner; Henry Halford
- Succeeded by: George Curzon-Howe; Thomas Paget

Personal details
- Born: 23 September 1792
- Died: 27 October 1867 (aged 75)
- Resting place: Packe family mausoleum, Branksome Dene Chine, Poole
- Party: Conservative
- Spouse: Kitty Jenkyn Reading (m. 1822)
- Relations: George Hussey Packe
- Parent: Charles James Packe

Charles William Packe (23 September 1792 – 27 October 1867) was a British Conservative Party politician.

== Family ==
Packe was the oldest son of Charles James Packe and Penelope Dugdale, daughter of Richard Dugdale of Blyth Hall. He was also the brother of Great Northern Railway deputy chairman and Liberal politician George Hussey Packe. He married Kitty Jenkyn Reading, daughter of Thomas Hort, in 1822.

== Wealth ==
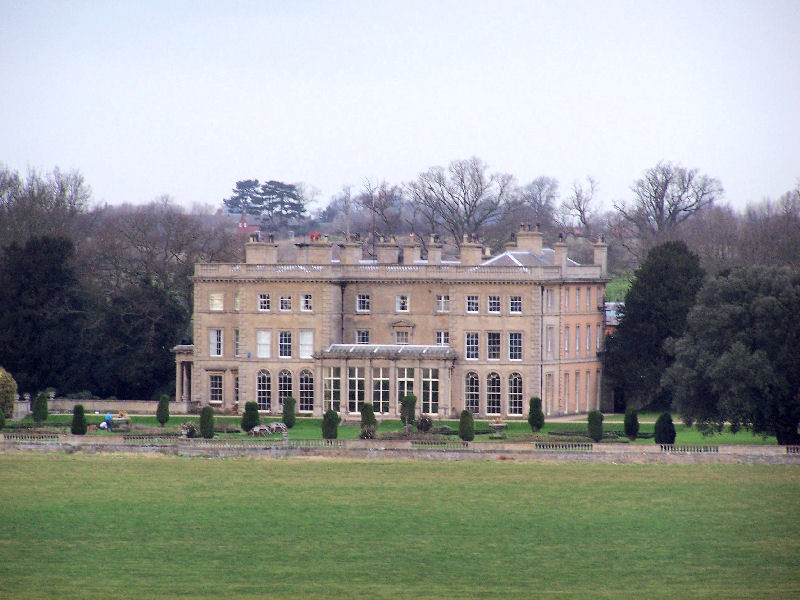
Prestwold Hall in Leicestershire

He inherited Prestwold Hall upon his father's death in 1837, and later acquired Glen Hall and an 18-acre estate in southern Leicestershire for £2,530 in 1837 and, a decade later, Stretton Hall for £30,000, financed by a mortgage from Sir George Robinson. In 1842, he commissioned William Burn to redesign Prestwold Hall, spending a reported £70,000 over the next two decades on improvements and further land close to the hall. A decade later, he spent £12,000 on a house and 745 acres of land at Branksome in Dorset, also using Burn, via a loan of £7,000.

Packe was also a keen investor in bank stock, government consols, and railway shares, the latter of which he had £4,050 in during the mid-1840s.

By the time of his death, Packe owned 2,464 acres in Leicestershire, worth £4,267 gross a year, with a gross personal wealth of £35,000.

== Political career ==
He was elected MP for South Leicestershire at a by-election in 1836 and held the seat until his death in 1867. During this time, he rented a home at Richmond Terrace, just off Whitehall, in London.

Parliament of the United Kingdom
Preceded by Thomas Frewen Turner; Henry Halford	Member of Parliament for South Leicestershire; 1836–1867; With: George Curzon-Howe (1857–1867); Henry Halford (1836–1857)	Succeeded by George Curzon-Howe; Thomas Paget
