= Thomas Paget (MP for South Leicestershire) =

English banker and politician

Thomas Tertius Paget JP, DL (27 December 1807 – 16 October 1892) was an English banker and Liberal Party politician.

Paget was the eldest son of the banker and Whig politician Thomas Paget (1778–1862) and his wife Anne Pares. He was a partner in Leicester Bank and became a J. P. and a Deputy Lieutenant for Leicestershire and High Sheriff of Leicestershire in 1869.

Paget was elected as a Member of Parliament (MP) for the Southern Division of Leicestershire at a by-election in November 1867, filling the vacancy caused by the death of the Conservative Party MP Charles William Packe. However, he was defeated at the 1868 general election, and was unsuccessful both at a further by-election in 1870 and at the 1874 general election. He finally regained the seat, after a twelve-year absence from the House of Commons, at the 1880 general election, and when the constituency was abolished under the Redistribution of Seats Act 1885, he was elected at the 1885 general election for the new Harborough Division of Leicestershire. He retired from Parliament at the 1886 general election.

Paget died at the age of 84, having married Katharine Geraldine McCausland, daughter of Marcus McCausland of Drenagh, County Londonderry, in 1850.

Parliament of the United Kingdom
Preceded by Viscount Curzon; Charles Packe	Member of Parliament for South Leicestershire; 1867 – 1868; With: Viscount Curzon	Succeeded by Viscount Curzon; Albert Pell
Preceded by Albert Pell; William Unwin Heygate	Member of Parliament for South Leicestershire; 1880 – 1885; With: Albert Pell	Constituency abolished
New constituency	Member of Parliament for Harborough; 1885 – 1886	Succeeded by Thomas Tapling
