= Branxholme (disambiguation) =

Branxholme is a village in the Scottish Borders.

Branxholme may also refer to:

- Branxholme Castle, near Branxholme, Scottish Borders
- Branxholme, Victoria, Australia
- Branxholme in the south of New Zealand'south Island is the seat of the Branxholme Locomotive Dump

== See also ==
- Branxholm, Tasmania
- Branksome (disambiguation)
