= Thomas Frewen Turner =

British politician

Thomas Frewen Turner (26 August 1811 – 1870) was a British politician.

Born at Cold Overton in Leicestershire, Thomas was the eldest son of John Frewen-Turner. He succeeded to the family estates in 1829.

Turner stood in the 1835 UK general election in South Leicestershire for the Conservative Party, winning a seat. He stood down by accepting the Chiltern Hundreds in January 1836.

Parliament of the United Kingdom
Preceded by Edward Dawson; Henry Halford	Member of Parliament for South Leicestershire; 1835 – 1836; With: Henry Halford	Succeeded by Charles Packe; Henry Halford
