= All Saints' Church, Blaby =

Church in Blaby, Leicestershire

Coordinates: 52°34′32″N 1°09′35″W

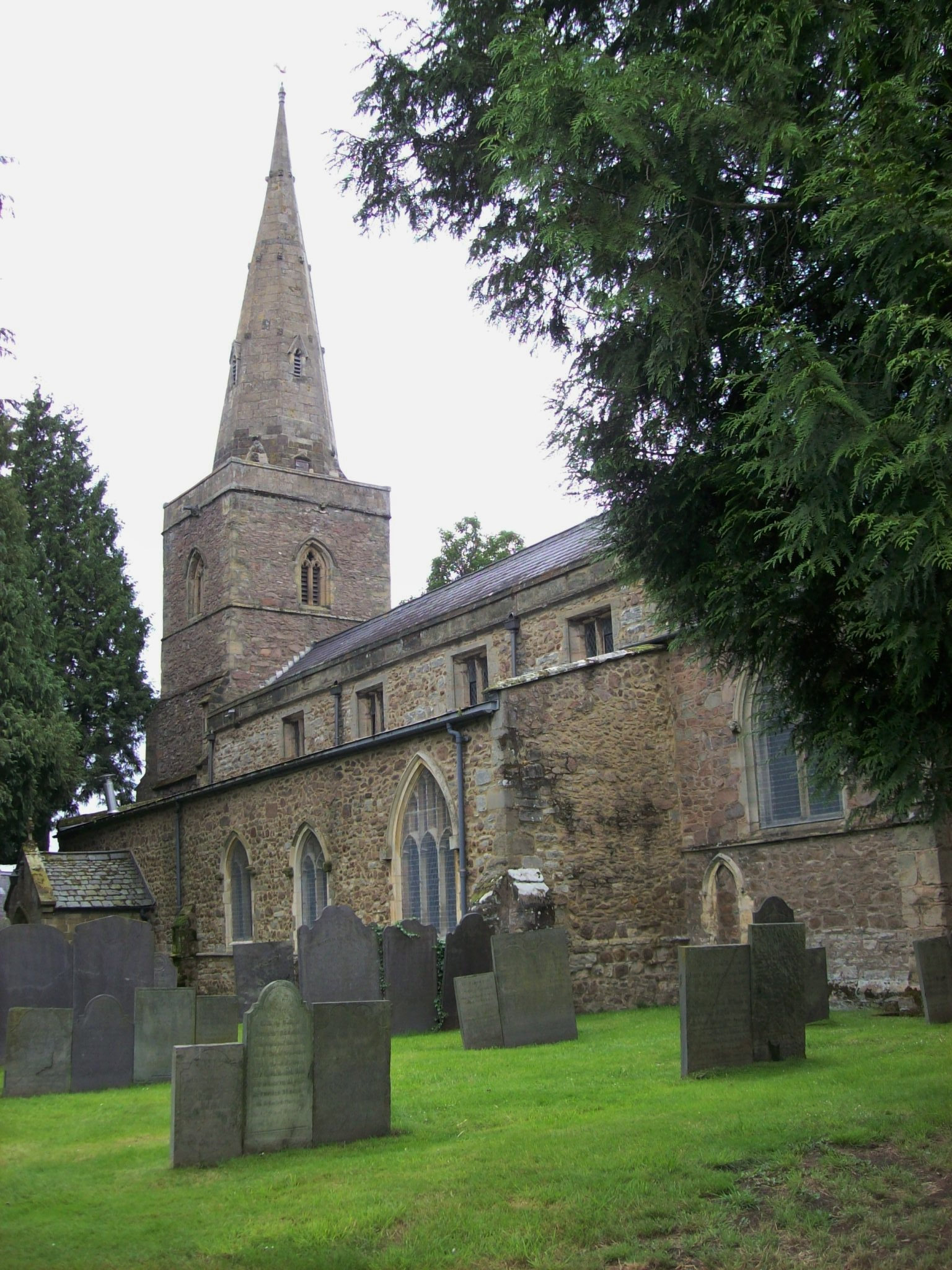
- Denomination: Church of England

History
- Dedication: All Saints'

Administration
- Province: Canterbury
- Diocese: Leicester
- Archdeaconry: Loughborough
- Parish: Blaby

Clergy
- Rector: Jane Micklethwaite

All Saints' Church is a church in Blaby, Leicestershire. It is a Grade I listed building.

== History ==
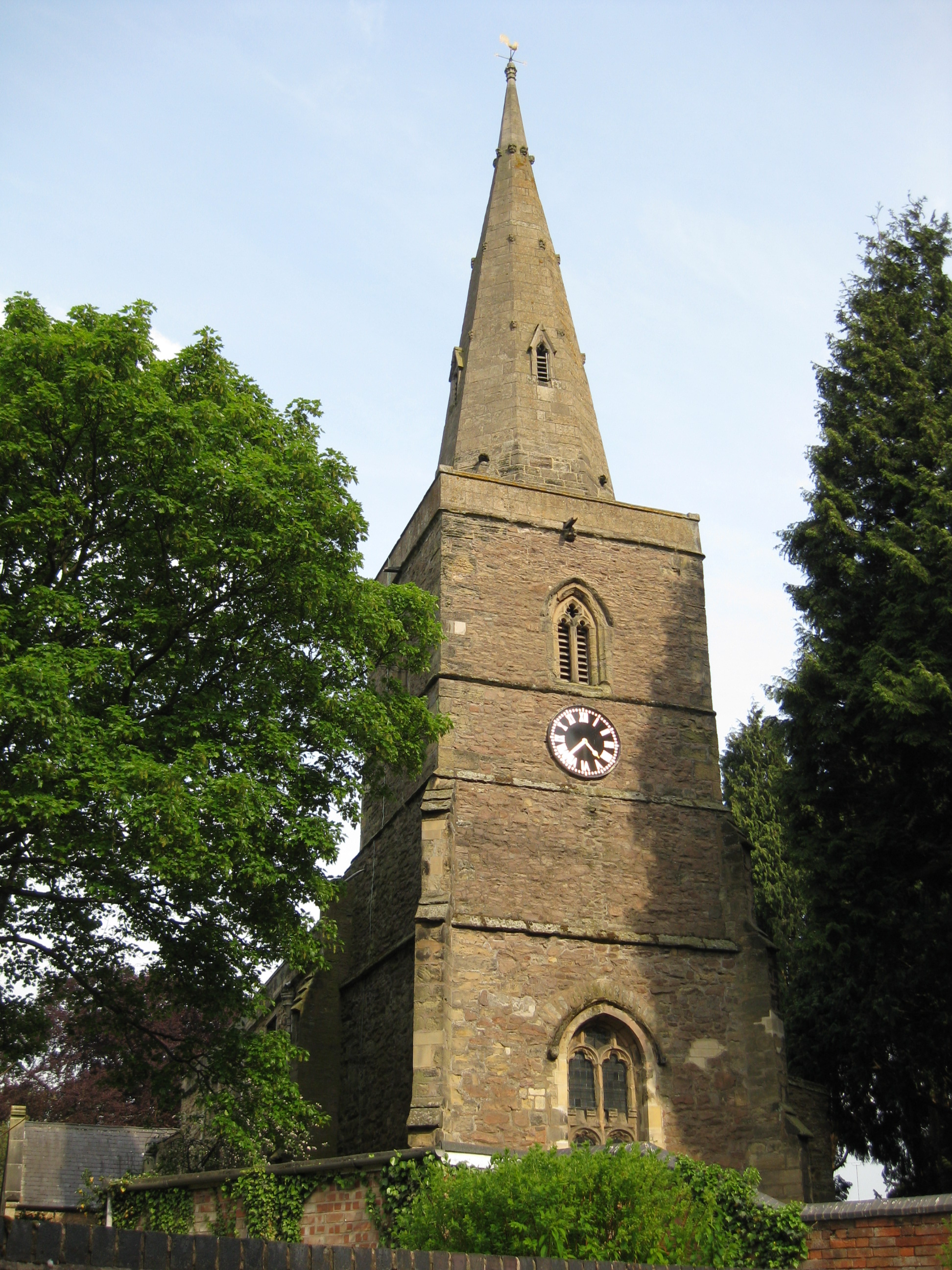
Tower with spire

The church consists of a nave, vestry, chancel, tower, spire and south aisle. The roof on the south aisle dates to 1630 and was built by Rob Biggs. The nave has a gallery with fluted pillars. It was added by Thomas Exon in c1740.

The church was renovated in 1846 by the Revd Henry James Hoskyns. The roof was then completed by Stephen Fry and the church was reopened a year later. The church then went under more work 10 years later when the tower and spire were fixed after being partially ruined since 1828. A porch was added, the windows were replaced and the chancel was restored. The spire was then rebuilt between 1900 and 1914. New stained glass and tracery were then added in 1951.
