= Blaby =

Town in Leicestershire, England

Coordinates: 52.57240°N 1.16777°W

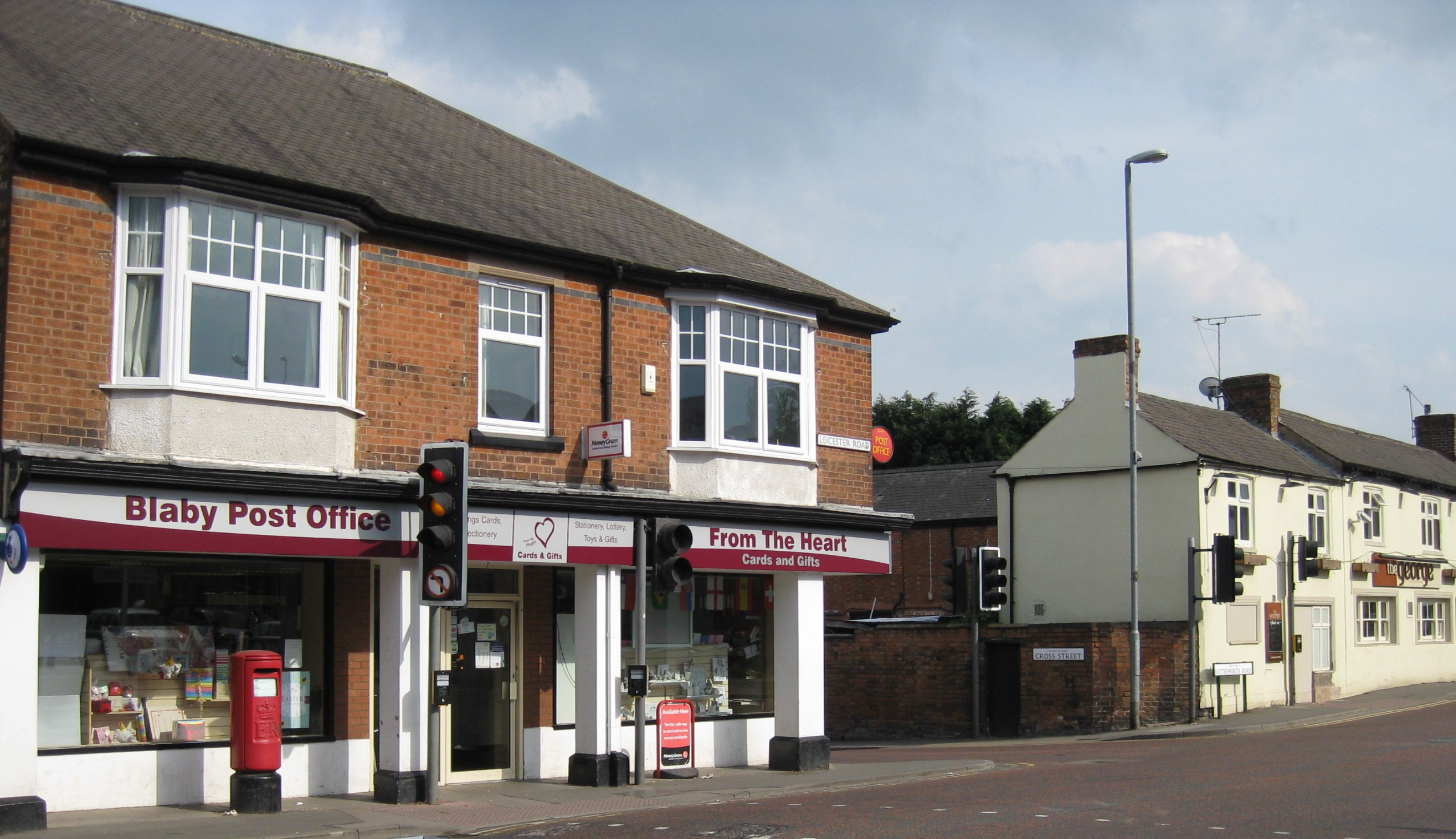
- Blaby Post Office and The George pub (now named Fox & Tiger)

- Location within Leicestershire
- Population: 6,194
- District: Blaby
- Shire county: Leicestershire
- Region: East Midlands
- Country: England
- Sovereign state: United Kingdom
- Post town: LEICESTER
- Postcode district: LE8
- Dialling code: 0116
- Police: Leicestershire
- Fire: Leicestershire
- Ambulance: East Midlands
- UK Parliament: South Leicestershire

Blaby (/ˈbleɪbi/) is a village in the Blaby District in central Leicestershire, England, approximately five miles (8 km) south of Leicester city centre. At the time of the 2011 census, Blaby had a population of 6,194, falling slightly from 6,240 in 2001. Given Blaby's proximity to the city, it is part of the Leicester Urban Area.

Its name likely came from Old Norse. Blábýr = "farmstead or village belonging to a man named Blár" (where the -r is a case ending). There seems to have been a dense patch of Viking settlement in Leicestershire, although some records in the Blaby Library indicate the origin of the village's name was from the first vicar. Blaby is twinned with the village of Villers-sous-Saint-Leu in France.

== Buildings ==
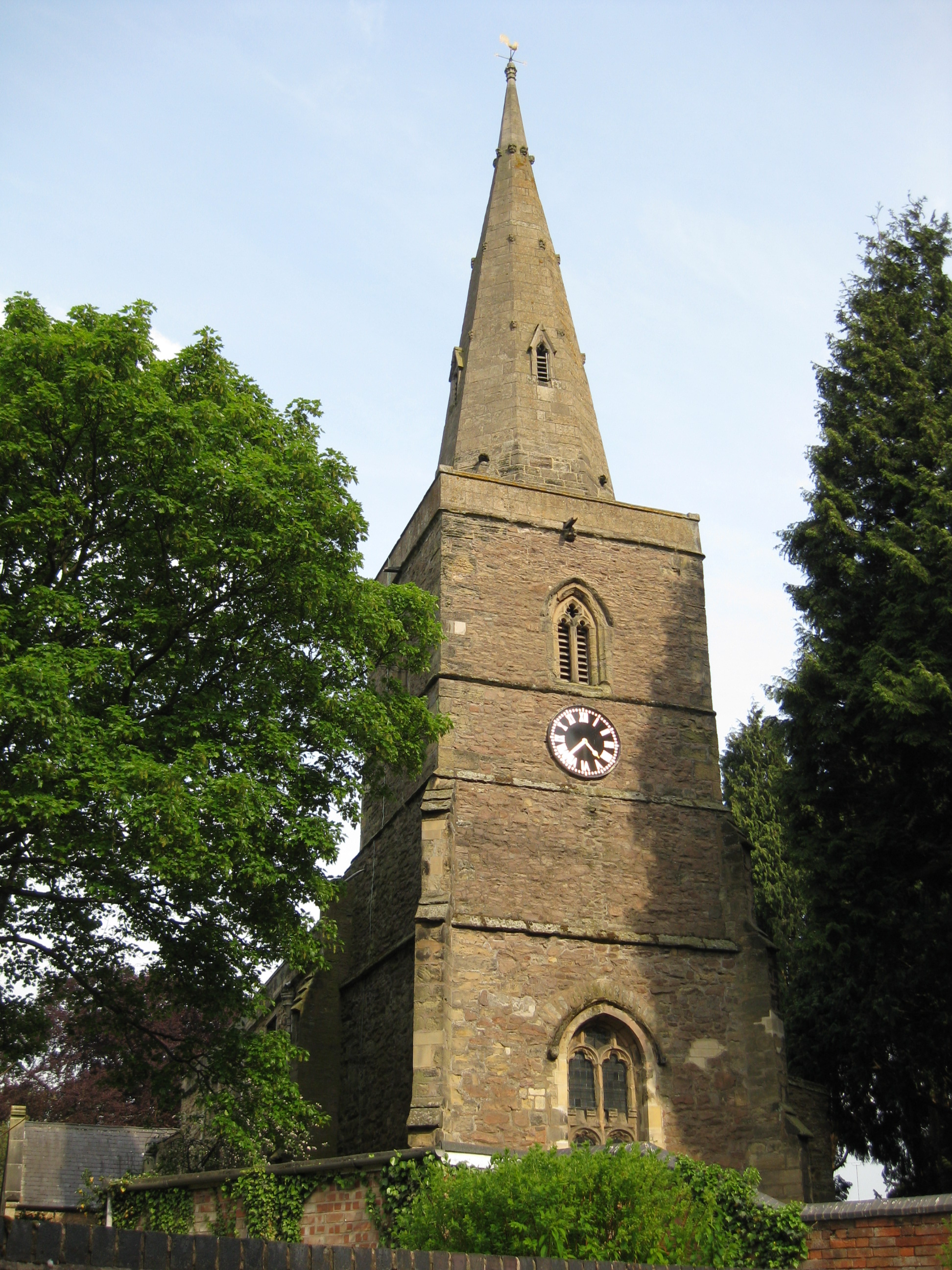
All Saints' Church, Blaby

While there are few buildings of outstanding historical or architectural interest, old Blaby is a conservation area. Old Blaby contains The Bakers Arms, a thatched public house that dates back to 1485. The other public houses to be found in Blaby are The Fox & Tiger, The Bulls Head and The Black Horse. The Tom Thumb and The Egyptian Queen have been demolished. Blaby is home to three schools: Blaby Stokes CE Primary School, Blaby Thistly Meadow Primary School, and Foxfields Academy.

== Parks ==
To the south of the Bakers Arms stands Bouskell Park, with a 19th-century ice house. Other parks include Northfield Park, home to Blaby Village Cricket Club and Oakfield Park, located off Hospital Lane.

== Shops ==
Most shops and amenities stand on the old A426 road between Leicester to the north and Lutterworth to the south. Fosse Park shopping centre, the M1 motorway, and the M69 motorway are a few miles away.

== Surrounding area ==
Blaby gives its name to the Blaby district and previously to the Parliamentary constituency that was held by former Chancellor of the Exchequer Nigel Lawson between 1974 and 1992. Blaby is now part of the constituency of South Leicestershire and represented by Alberto Costa of the Conservative Party.

There was a railway station on the Birmingham to Peterborough Line, but it closed in 1968.

The "Blaby Special" heirloom tomato variety originates from the Shoults' Tomato Farm, which was located in Blaby from circa 1908 until 1948: the variety was thought to be extinct but was revived from a seed bank in 2005.

A new school was incorporated (Blaby Stokes C of E) to absorb the influx of children from families new to the village taking up residence in the new development.

== Sport ==
Blaby is home to rugby union side, Leicester Lions, who play at the 2,000 capacity Westleigh Park.

== People associated with Blaby ==
- Richard Duke clergyman of the Church of England
- Lord Lawson of Blaby (former MP for Blaby, and also served as Chancellor of the Exchequer, under Margaret Thatcher)
- Tom Meighan lead singer with Kasabian (1997–2020)
