= Blaby (constituency) =

UK Parliament constituency (1974–2010)

Coordinates: 52.50°N 1.20°W

- Former county constituency for the House of Commons
- Boundary of Blaby in Leicestershire for the 2005 general election

- Location of Leicestershire within England
- County: Leicestershire

1974–2010
- Seats: One
- Created from: Harborough
- Replaced by: South Leicestershire

Blaby was a county constituency represented in the House of Commons of the Parliament of the United Kingdom, which existed from 1974 until 2010. It elected one Member of Parliament (MP) by the first past the post system of election. It was a safe seat for the Conservative Party, being held by Conservative MPs throughout its existence.

== History ==
Blaby constituency was created in 1974 from parts of the Harborough seat. It is named after the village of Blaby in south west Leicestershire. A safe Conservative seat consisting mostly of middle-class commuter towns and villages for the neighbouring city of Leicester, it was held for many years by the former Chancellor of the Exchequer Nigel Lawson. Lawson was succeeded in 1992 by Andrew Robathan, who held the seat until its abolition.

Following its review of parliamentary representation in Leicestershire, the Boundary Commission for England renamed the Blaby constituency as South Leicestershire, with minor alterations to its boundaries, in time for the 2010 election.

== Boundaries ==
1974–1983: The Rural Districts of Blaby and Lutterworth.

1983–1997: The District of Blaby, and the District of Harborough wards of Broughton, Dunton, Gilmorton, Kilworth, Lutterworth Linden, Lutterworth St Mary's, Lutterworth Sherrier, Lutterworth Wycliffe, Peatling, and Ullesthorpe.

1997–2010: The District of Blaby wards of Cosby, Countesthorpe, Croft Hill, Enderby, Flamville, Fosse, Glen Parva, Millfield, Narborough, Normanton, Northfield, Ravenhurst, St John's, Stanton, Whetstone, Winchester, and Winstanley, and the District of Harborough wards of Broughton, Dunton, Gilmorton, Kilworth, Lutterworth Linden, Lutterworth St Mary's, Lutterworth Sherrier, Lutterworth Wycliffe, Peatling, and Ullesthorpe.

== Members of Parliament ==
Election	Member	Party	Notes
February 1974	Nigel Lawson	Conservative	Later Baron Lawson of Blaby; Cabinet minister 1981–1989
1992	Andrew Robathan	Conservative	Later Baron Robathan of Poultney
2010	Constituency abolished: see South Leicestershire		

== Elections ==
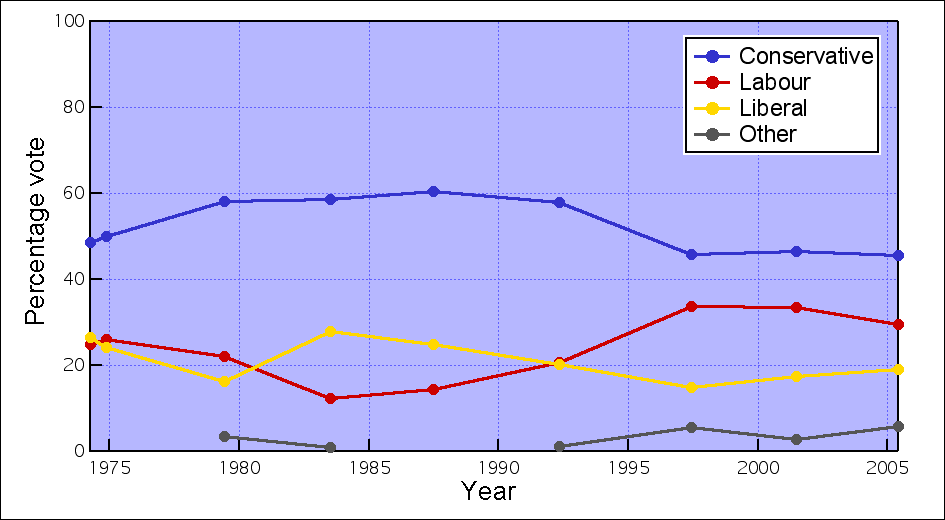
General election results

=== Elections in the 1970s ===
General election February 1974: Blaby
Party	Candidate	Votes	%	±%
Conservative	Nigel Lawson	26,892	48.7	
Liberal	G. Broad	14,594	26.4	
Labour	D. E. Lack	13,749	24.9	
Majority		12,298	22.3	
Turnout		55,235	85.6	
Conservative win (new seat)				

General election October 1974: Blaby
Party	Candidate	Votes	%	±%
Conservative	Nigel Lawson	25,405	49.9	+1.2
Labour	Malcolm Fox	13,244	26.0	+1.1
Liberal	D. Inman	12,290	24.1	−2.3
Majority		12,161	23.9	+1.6
Turnout		50,939	78.3	−7.3
Conservative hold		Swing		

General election 1979: Blaby
Party	Candidate	Votes	%	±%
Conservative	Nigel Lawson	33,221	58.1	+8.2
Labour	Keith Hill	12,581	22.0	−4.0
Liberal	D. Inman	9,277	16.2	−7.9
National Front	P. Gegan	2,056	3.6	New
Majority		20,640	36.1	+12.2
Turnout		57,135	83.3	+5.0
Conservative hold		Swing		

=== Elections in the 1980s ===
General election 1983: Blaby
Party	Candidate	Votes	%	±%
Conservative	Nigel Lawson	32,689	58.7	+0.6
Alliance (Liberal)	Richard Lustig	15,573	28.0	+11.8
Labour	Christopher Wrigley	6,838	12.3	−9.7
National Front	P. Gegan	568	1.0	−2.6
Majority		17,116	30.7	−5.4
Turnout		55,668	77.4	−5.9
Conservative hold		Swing		

General election 1987: Blaby
Party	Candidate	Votes	%	±%
Conservative	Nigel Lawson	37,732	60.5	+1.8
Alliance (Liberal)	Richard Lustig	15,556	25.0	−3.0
Labour	James Roberts	9,046	14.5	+2.2
Majority		22,176	35.5	+4.8
Turnout		62,334	80.9	+3.5
Conservative hold		Swing		

=== Elections in the 1990s ===
General election 1992: Blaby
Party	Candidate	Votes	%	±%
Conservative	Andrew Robathan	39,498	57.9	−2.6
Labour	Ethel Ranson	14,151	20.8	+6.3
Liberal Democrats	Marjorie Lewin	13,780	20.2	−4.8
BNP	John Peacock	521	0.8	New
Natural Law	Sue Lincoln	260	0.4	New
Majority		25,347	37.1	+1.6
Turnout		68,210	83.4	+2.5
Conservative hold		Swing		

General election 1997: Blaby
Party	Candidate	Votes	%	±%
Conservative	Andrew Robathan	24,564	45.8	−12.1
Labour	Ross Willmott	18,090	33.8	+13.0
Liberal Democrats	Geoff Welsh	8,001	14.9	−5.3
Referendum	Robert Harrison	2,018	3.8	New
BNP	John Peacock	523	1.0	+0.2
Independent	Terence Stokes	397	0.7	New
Majority		6,474	12.0	−25.1
Turnout		53,593	76.1	−7.3
Conservative hold		Swing		

=== Elections in the 2000s ===
General election 2001: Blaby
Party	Candidate	Votes	%	±%
Conservative	Andrew Robathan	22,104	46.4	+0.6
Labour	John Morgan	15,895	33.4	−0.4
Liberal Democrats	Geoff Welsh	8,286	17.4	+2.5
BNP	Edward Scott	1,357	2.8	+1.8
Majority		6,209	13.0	+1.0
Turnout		47,642	64.5	−11.6
Conservative hold		Swing		

General election 2005: Blaby
Party	Candidate	Votes	%	±%
Conservative	Andrew Robathan	22,487	45.5	−0.9
Labour	John Morgan	14,614	29.6	−3.8
Liberal Democrats	Jeff Stephenson	9,382	19.0	+1.6
BNP	Michael Robinson	1,704	3.5	+0.7
UKIP	Delroy Young	1,201	2.4	New
Majority		7,873	15.9	+2.9
Turnout		49,388	65.5	+1.0
Conservative hold		Swing	+1.5	

From the general election of 2010, Blaby has been re-shaped and renamed South Leicestershire.

== See also ==
- Parliamentary constituencies in Leicestershire and Rutland

== Sources ==
- "United Kingdom Parliamentary Election Results 1997". Election Demon. 15 December 2019. Archived from the original on 15 December 2019.
- Guardian Unlimited Politics | Ask Aristotle | Blaby - Election History - Elections (1992–1997)
- UK General Elections since 1832 - Elections (1974–1992)

Parliament of the United Kingdom
Preceded by Surrey East	Constituency represented by the chancellor of the Exchequer; 1983–1989	Succeeded by Huntingdon
