= Sir Henry Halford, 2nd Baronet =

English Tory and later Conservative politician

Sir Henry Halford, 2nd Baronet (1797 – 22 May 1868) was an English Tory and later Conservative politician who sat in the House of Commons from 1832 to 1857.

Halford was the son of Sir Henry Halford, 1st Baronet and his wife Hon. Elizabeth Barbara St John daughter of John St John, 12th Baron St John of Bletso.

Halford was elected at the 1832 general election as one of the two Members of Parliament (MP) for the newly created Southern division of Leicestershire, and held the seat at five further general elections until he stood down at the 1857 general election. He faced only one contested election, in 1841, when he was returned with a large majority.

Halford married his cousin Barbara Vaughan, daughter of Sir John Vaughan, his paternal uncle and his wife Louisa Boughton, widow of St Andrew St John, 14th Baron St John of Bletso and daughter of Sir Charles William Rouse-Boughton, 9th Baronet. They had two sons (both of whom married, but died issueless)

- Sir Henry St. John Halford, 3rd Baronet
- Reverend Sir John Frederick Halford, 4th Bart.

Parliament of the United Kingdom
| New constituency see Leicestershire | Member of Parliament for South Leicestershire; 1832 – 1857; With: Edward Dawson to 1835; Thomas Frewen Turner 1835–1836; Charles Packe from 1836 | Succeeded by Viscount Curzon; Charles Packe |
Baronetage of the United Kingdom
| Preceded by Henry Halford | Baronet (of Wistow); 1844–1868 | Succeeded by Henry Halford |
