= Branksome, Dorset =

Suburb of Poole, Dorset, England

Coordinates: 50.725°N 1.915°W

Branksome
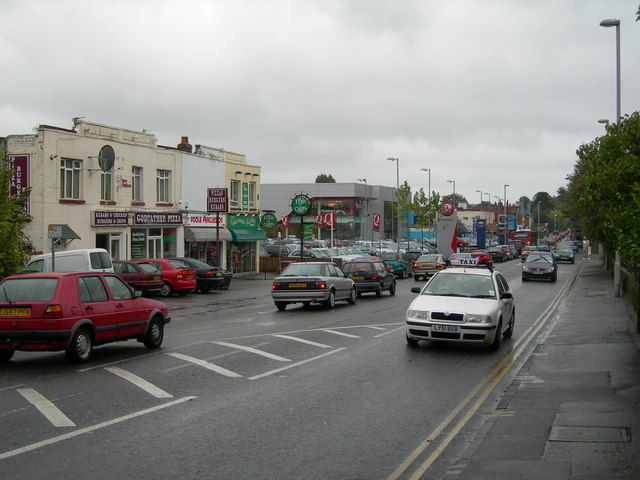
- Poole Road, Branksome

- Location within Dorset
- Population: 13,622 (both wards 2011)
- OS grid reference: SZ0591
- Unitary authority: Bournemouth, Christchurch and Poole
- Ceremonial county: Dorset
- Region: South West
- Country: England
- Sovereign state: United Kingdom
- Post town: POOLE
- Postcode district: BH12, BH13
- Dialling code: 01202
- Police: Dorset
- Fire: Dorset and Wiltshire
- Ambulance: South Western
- UK Parliament: Poole, Bournemouth West

Branksome (/ˈbræŋksəm/) is a suburb of Poole, in the Bournemouth, Christchurch and Poole district, in the ceremonial county of Dorset, England. The area consists of residential properties and also a number of commercial and industrial areas.

It borders Parkstone, another small Poole suburb, to the west and north west, Alder Hills to the north east, Branksome Park (a more affluent forested area) to the south and Westbourne (a suburb of Bournemouth, Poole's conurbation neighbour) to the east.

== Overview ==
Until the late 19th century the area was mainly unbuilt heath and woodlands. With the development and growth of nearby Bournemouth and later Poole the area became popular as a place to live, mainly because the area was relatively undeveloped but yet was within commuting distance between Poole and Bournemouth.

The Branksome Urban District was created by the Local Government Act 1894 and absorbed into the municipal borough of Poole in 1905

With the development of the railways, Branksome continued to grow, served by the new Victorian line between Wimborne, Poole and Bournemouth. Branksome railway station, which still serves the area today, helped encourage a massive growth in the early 20th century. Most of the houses in Branksome today are from the Edwardian period and before the Second World War except for a 1970s development off of Winston Avenue known as the Farnham Estate and also a small amount of in-filling.

The area became an official suburb of Poole in the 1960s and by the 1980s almost all open areas of Branksome were built upon. The area however still has some heathland towards the Wallisdown and Canford Heath areas, as well as a large and popular park known as the Branksome Recreation Ground, which is home to Parkstone Cricket Club. Branksome merges with the area known as Branksome Park, an area of more expensive properties.

== Commercial development ==
There are three main areas of commercial development within the Branksome Parish.

The main area, Poole Retail Park (sometimes known as Redlands after the pipe factory once on the site) is situated along the main Poole to Bournemouth A35. It is a commercial and shopping area.

The John Lewis store named John Lewis at Home opened in Branksome on 22 October 2009. The £6 million development is one-third of the size of a normal John Lewis department store and is the first of a new experimental format for the retailer focusing exclusively on homeware.

Accessed from Alder Road but essentially part of the Poole Retail Park area is a series of industrial buildings that were associated with the former confectionary factory that ceased operating in 2013. BCP Council approved plans for the site to be turned into a 70-bed residential care home with 32 extra care apartments in 2016. Aldi purchased the site in 2018, and made an unsuccessful bid to seek planning approval to turn it into a supermarket in August 2020. Despite this, the Daily Echo reports in February 2022 that the supermarket chain is now hopeful that a decision on its revised plans for a new store on the disused sweet factory site will be made "in the near future".

The second area is situated on the old Gas Works site near to Yarmouth Road and Bourne Valley Road, known as Branksome Business Park it contains a number of industrial units.

The third area is situated to the northern end of the parish and is known as the Sharp Road Industrial Estate. Just outside the parish and to the west lies another substantial industrial area which includes a post office sorting office and other commercial developments.

Branksome has three main supermarkets. Along the A35 (Poole Road) there are a number of small independent retailers including fast food outlets, a bowling complex and a car showroom.

The major insurer Liverpool Victoria is situated towards the east of the boundary in a large building contained within the County Gates Roundabout.

Along Alder Road are a number of small independent shops. This area is known locally as "Alder Parade".

== Transport ==
Branksome is served by hourly South Western Railway trains, calling at Branksome railway station on the South West Main Line between Weymouth and London Waterloo. However the closure of the Somerset and Dorset Joint Railway cut the direct line linking to Bath.

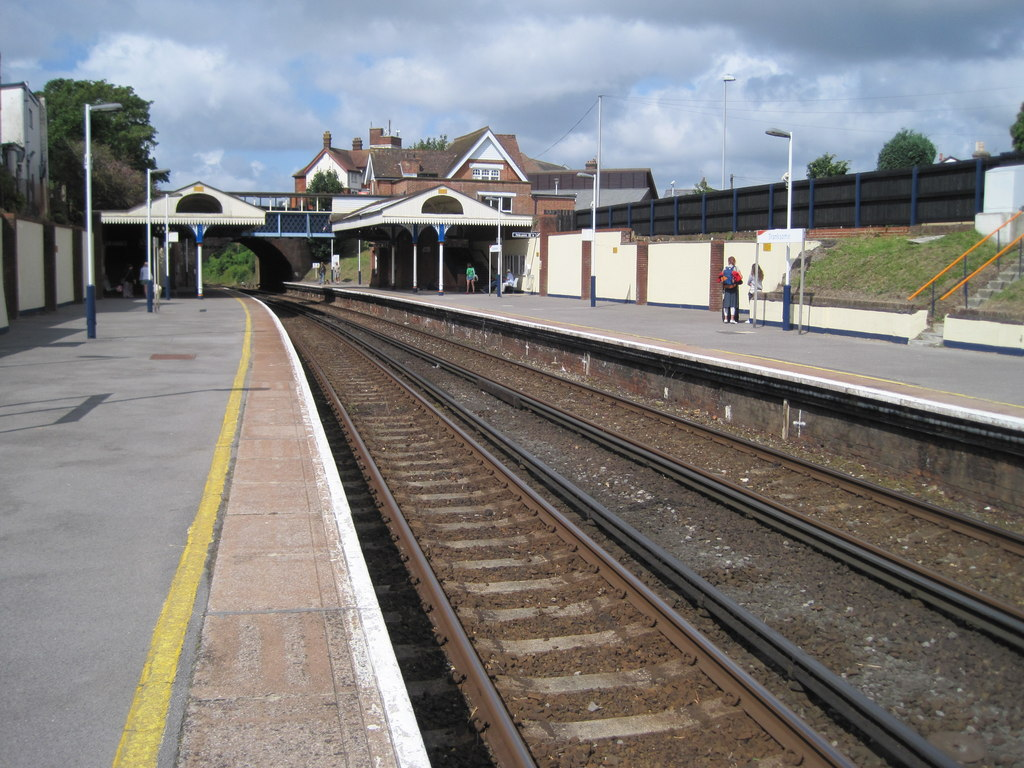
Branksome railway station

Branksome has bus links to many areas of Bournemouth and Poole. As of November 2022 Branksome is served by morebus services m1, m2, 15, 16, 17, 20 and U2.

National Express coaches call at Branksome, Poole Road with services to London Victoria, Heathrow Airport and Gatwick Airport.

== Education ==
Branksome is home to Bishop Aldhelm's CE Primary School.

== Politics ==
Branksome lies partly within the UK Parliamentary constituency of Poole and partly within Bournemouth West.

The unitary authority ward is Alderney and Bourne Valley, and is represented by Councillors Adrian Chapmanlaw, Rachel Maidment and Tony Trent, on Bournemouth, Poole and Christchurch Council.

From 1894 to 1905 Branksome was an urban district, Branksome Urban District Council's former headquarters were made into an Elderly Persons' dwelling in 1987 and called Bob Hann House after Robert George Hann, Mayor of Poole 1968/69, who was Chairman of the Poole Borough Housing Committee from 1973 until his death in 1986.

On 30 December 1894 Branksome Urban District became a separate civil parish from Kinson. On 9 November 1905 the parish was abolished and merged with Poole. In 1901 the parish had a population of 8095. It is now in the unparished area of Poole.

== Places of worship ==
The parish church of Branksome is St Aldhelm's Church which falls within the Diocese of Salisbury.

Other places of worship include:

- Gateway Church
- Parkstone Baptist Church
- Dorset Islamic Cultural Association
- Kingdom Hall of Jehovah's Witnesses

== Medical ==
Heatherview Medical Centre is located near to the Sainsbury supermarket off Alder Road in Alder Hills. The local clinical commissioning group is NHS Dorset CCG.

== Industrial heritage ==
- Sharp, Jones and Co - Pipe Manufacturers
- Bournemouth Gas Works
- Railway Viaducts
- Electricity Sub Station
- Old clay work ponds

== Notable residents ==
- Lord Ventry – Airship Pioneer. Owned a large house and land in between Poole Road and Lindsey Road.
- Charles Packe – Member of Parliament. Lived in Branksome and buried in the Packe family mausoleum
