= Eddie Dawson (footballer) =

English footballer

Personal information
- Full name: Edward Dawson
- Date of birth: 16 January 1913
- Place of birth: Chester-le-Street, England
- Date of death: 1970 (aged 56–57)
- Height: 5 ft 9 in (1.75 m)
- Position: Goalkeeper

Senior career*
Years	Team	Apps	(Gls)
–1934	Blyth Spartans		
1934–1936	Manchester City	0	(0)
1936–1939	Bristol City	66	(0)
1946–1949	Gateshead	83	(0)
1949–19??	North Shields	?	(?)
- * Club domestic league appearances and goals

Edward Dawson (16 January 1913 – 1970) was an English footballer who played as a goalkeeper.

Dawson started his career with non-league Blyth Spartans before signing for Manchester City in 1934. He joined Bristol City in 1936 without having made a first team appearance for Manchester City. He made 66 league appearances for Bristol City before the outbreak of World War II. Dawson joined Gateshead in 1946, making 83 league appearances before joining non-league North Shields in 1949.
