= Branksome Urban District =

Former urban district in Dorset, England

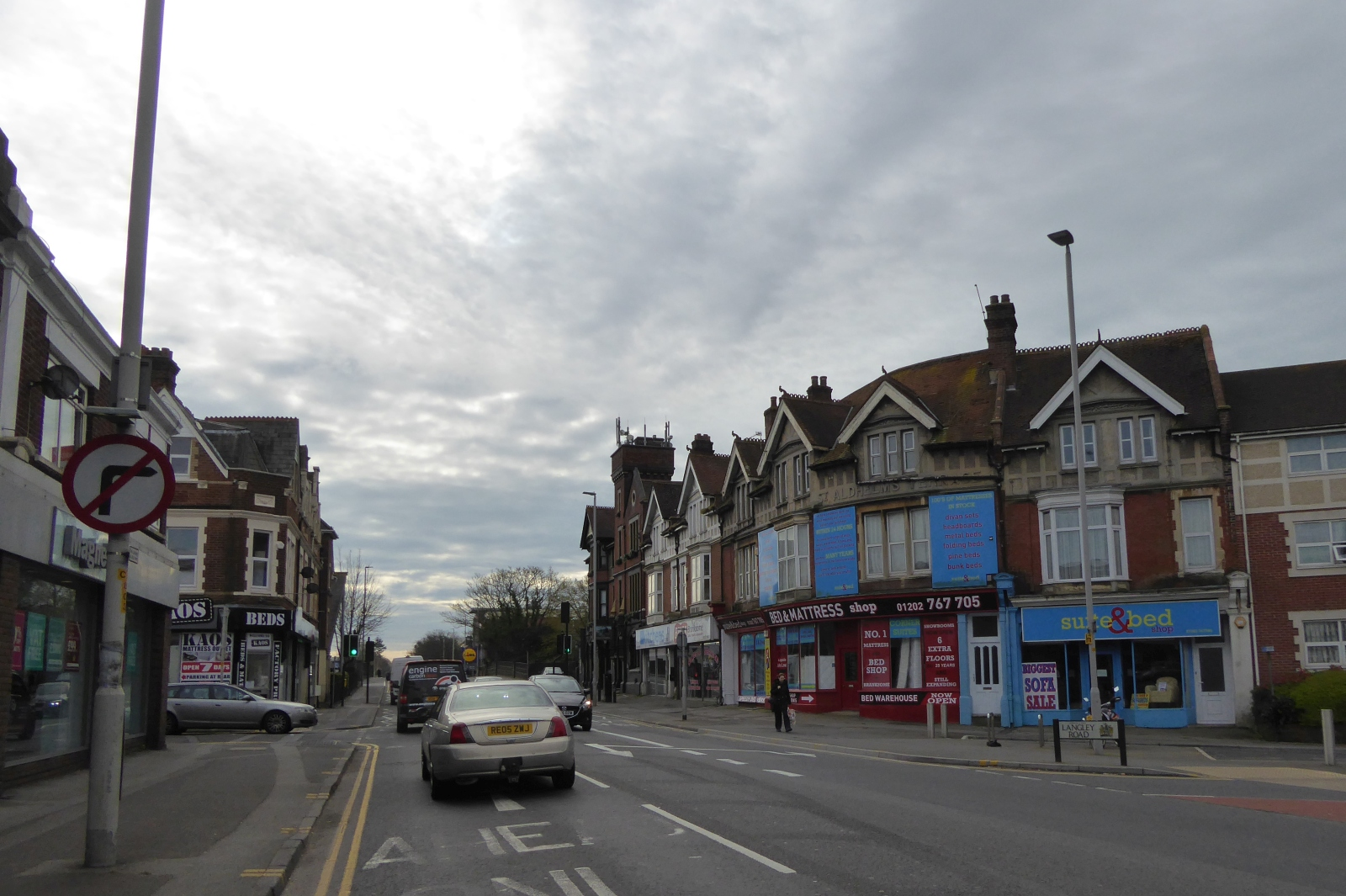
- History
  - Created: 1894
  - Abolished: 1905
- Status: Former urban district
- Today part of: Bournemouth, Christchurch and Poole

The Branksome Urban District was an urban district in Dorset, England. It was created in 1894 and absorbed into the municipal borough of Poole in 1905.

== See also ==
- Branksome, Dorset
