= Edward Dawson (politician) =

Edward Dawson (14 March 1802 – 1 June 1859) was an English Liberal Party politician. He was a Member of Parliament (MP) for South Leicestershire from 1832 to 1835.

Parliament of the United Kingdom
New constituency	Member of Parliament for South Leicestershire; 1832 – 1835; With: Sir Henry Halford, Bt.	Succeeded by Thomas Frewen Turner; Sir Henry Halford, Bt.
