= Alberto Costa (British politician) =

British politician (born 1971)

Alberto Costa MP
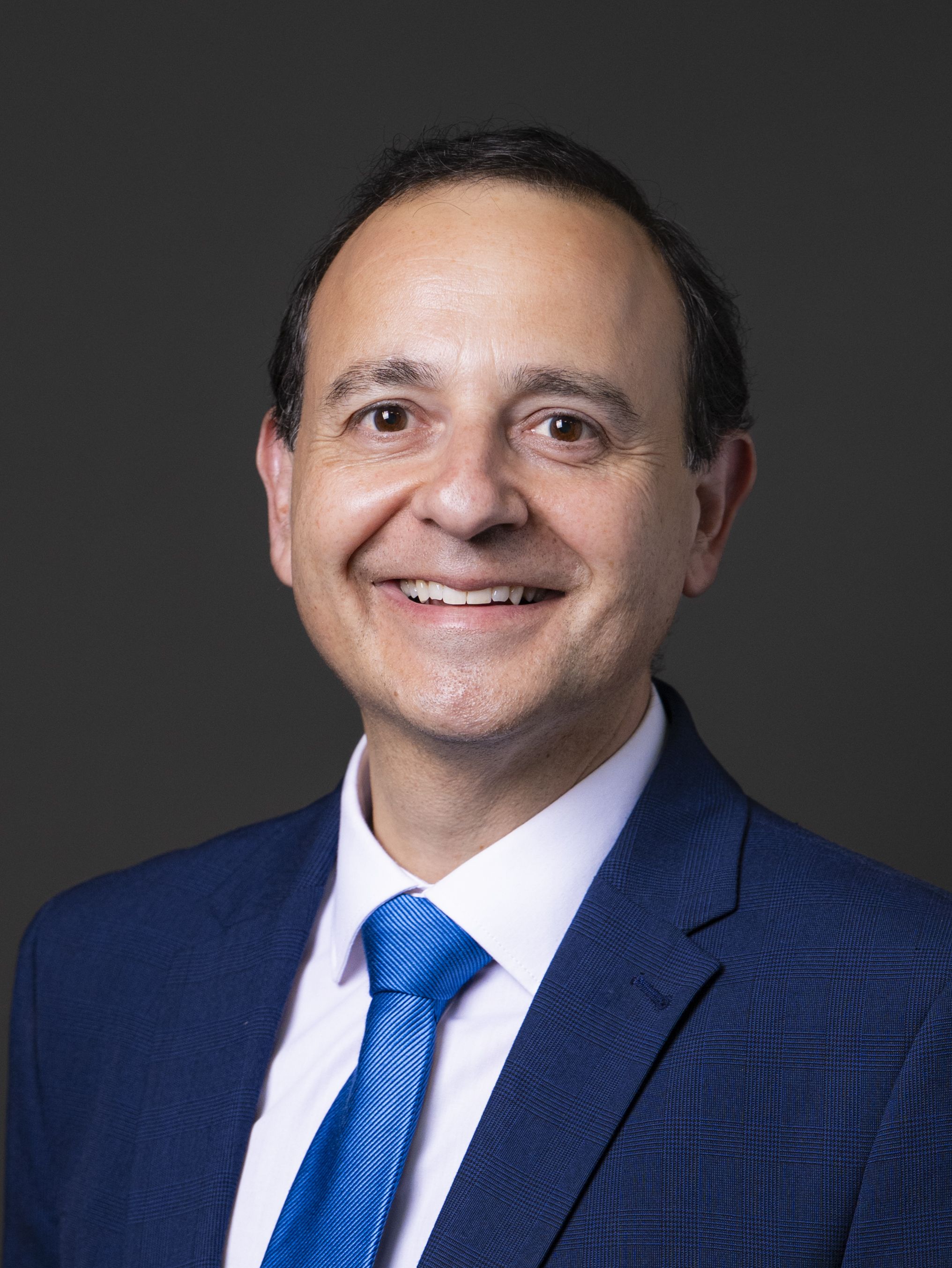
- Official portrait, 2026

Chair of the Committees on Standards and Privileges
- Incumbent
- Assumed office 11 September 2024
- Preceded by: Harriet Harman

Shadow Solicitor General for England and Wales
- In office 19 July 2024 – 6 November 2024
- Leader: Rishi Sunak
- Preceded by: Karl Turner
- Succeeded by: Helen Grant

Member of Parliament for South Leicestershire
- Incumbent
- Assumed office 7 May 2015
- Preceded by: Andrew Robathan
- Majority: 5,508 (10.8%)

Personal details
- Born: Alberto Castrenze Costa; 13 November 1971 (age 55) England
- Party: Conservative
- Education: University of Glasgow
- Website: albertocosta.org.uk

Alberto Castrenze Costa (born 13 November 1971) is a British Conservative Party politician who has been the Member of Parliament (MP) for South Leicestershire since 2015. He served as Shadow Solicitor General from July to November 2024.

== Early life and career ==
Alberto Costa was born on 13 November 1971 in England to Italian parents who have lived in Scotland for 50 years. He grew up in Bishopbriggs attending St Helens Roman Catholic Primary School and then Turnbull High School, before studying at the University of Glasgow, where he served as President of the Glasgow University Students' Representative Council in 1995/6.

He trained as a solicitor and worked at the Treasury Solicitor's Department.

== Parliamentary career ==
At the 2010 general election, Costa stood as the Conservative candidate in Angus, coming second with 30.9% of the vote behind the incumbent SNP MP Mike Weir.

Following his 2010 defeat in Angus, Costa was in 2015 "rewarded with a seat he ought to triumph in", namely South Leicestershire. He was elected to Parliament at the 2015 general election as that constituency's MP with 53.2% of the vote and a majority of 16,824.

Costa was opposed to Brexit prior to the 2016 EU referendum, although he went on to vote with the government on all subsequent Parliamentary Bills regarding Brexit.

At the snap 2017 general election, Costa was re-elected as MP for South Leicestershire with an increased vote share of 61.4% and an increased majority of 18,631.

Since 2018, he has campaigned against the release of the convicted child-killer Colin Pitchfork, who murdered two girls in the South Leicestershire constituency in the 1980s. Pitchfork was released from prison on 1 September 2021 before being recalled to prison weeks later for breaching his licence conditions. On 13 July 2022, Costa asked the Prime Minister Boris Johnson for the government's help in intervening in Pitchfork's next parole hearing which was scheduled to take place in September 2022, despite which Pitchfork was, in June 2023, granted parole a second time, a decision that was later reversed.

On 27 February 2019, he resigned from his role as parliamentary private secretary in the Scotland Office following his tabling of an amendment to protect the rights of EU citizens. Shortly before his resignation, Home Secretary Sajid Javid backed the amendment in a committee meeting and said that the Government would support it. It was later passed unopposed, approved 'on the nod' by the Commons.

In 2019, Costa sent a survey to 11,000 residents in villages close to the site of the proposed Hinckley National Rail Freight Interchange, fewer than 1 in 5 of which were completed and returned. In February 2020, he held a Westminster Hall debate in Parliament to discuss the plans and local concerns in more detail, in which three MPs including Costa participated. In June 2022 he held a further debate in Parliament on the proposals.

At the 2019 general election, Costa was again re-elected with an increased vote share of 64% and an increased majority of 24,004.

Costa campaigned for safety improvements to be made to the A5 road in South Leicestershire, specifically the High Cross and Smockington Hollow junctions, which are known locally as accident blackspots. In January 2020 he welcomed £3 million improvements put forward by National Highways to improve safety.

In January 2021, he asked the then Vaccination Minister Nadhim Zahawi to reopen the Feilding Palmer Hospital in Lutterworth as a vaccination hub during the COVID-19 pandemic, the hospital was then reopened as a vaccination hub in February 2021. In June 2021, Costa asked the then Health Secretary Sajid Javid for his help in keeping the Feilding Palmer Hospital in Lutterworth open, but failed as the hospital was shut.

In November 2021, he called on the government to allow more prescriptions of medical cannabis to children with rare forms of epilepsy, citing the case of two of his young constituents.

Linked to his work as Chairman of the All-Party Parliamentary Group for Microplastics, Costa touted a Ten Minute Rule Bill in Parliament on 30 November 2021 (the 'Microplastic Filters (Washing Machine) Bill') – the Bill failed to progress beyond its first reading.

At the 2024 general election, Costa was again re-elected, with a decreased vote share of 35.6% and a decreased majority of 5,506.

On 11 September 2024, Costa was elected Chair of the Standards Committee.

Parliament of the United Kingdom
Preceded by Andrew Robathan	Member of Parliament for South Leicestershire; 2015–present	Incumbent
Political offices
Preceded by Karl Turner	Shadow Solicitor General for England and Wales; 2024	Succeeded by Helen Grant
Preceded by Harriet Harman	Chair of the Standards Committee; 2024–present	Incumbent
