= Branksome Park =

Suburb of Poole, Dorset, England

Coordinates: 50.718°N 1.917°W

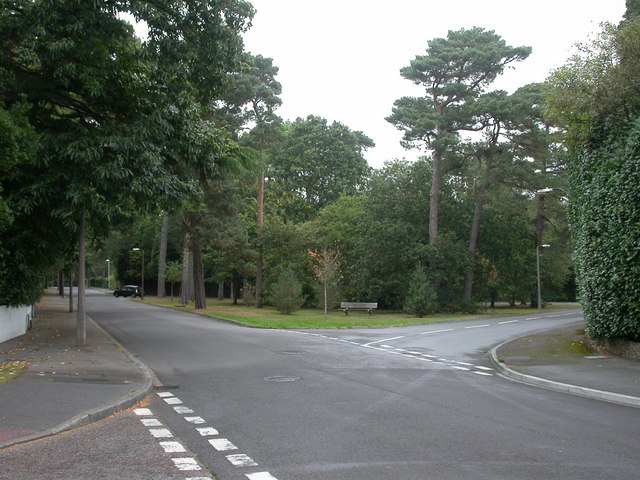
Tree-lined roads in Branksome Park: Western Avenue and Bury Road

Branksome Park is a suburb of Poole in Dorset, which adjoins Branksome, Dorset. The area covers approximately 360 acres (1.5 km^{2}), mostly occupied by housing, and includes Branksome Chine which leads to the award-winning blue-flagged beaches of Poole.

Branksome Park is one of Poole's most affluent areas. It is on the border of Poole, with Bournemouth being on the other side of The Avenue. It is less than 2 miles (3 km) from the shopping areas of Westbourne and The Square in the centre of Bournemouth.

Local facilities include a sports area with tennis courts and a bowling green. Branksome Park also has a small public library and is home to the All Saints Church constructed in 1877, and a school for disabled children which is located on the outskirts of the area.

== Demographics ==
A large percentage of the elderly people live in the area (Poole Town and Parkstone also have a high percentage). The population of elderly people (mainly over 85) in the area is expected to rise even more by 2025.

== History ==
Although Branksome Park is geographically part of Poole, its origin – like that of neighbouring Canford Cliffs, Lilliput and Sandbanks – is a result of overspill of the rapidly expanding town of Bournemouth at the turn of the 20th century. Wealthy landowners had settled originally on the East Cliff, then on the West Cliff, and later in Talbot Woods. A lack of remaining land suitable for opulent dwellings, combined with the popularity of Bournemouth as the leading seaside resort during the late Victorian and Edwardian eras, meant that the privileged classes would need to build on the heathland that extended to the Bournemouth boundary.

== Geography ==
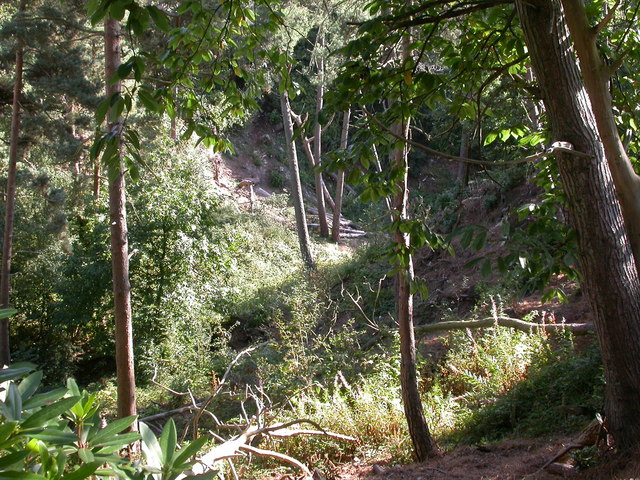
Branksome Chine

Situated on cliffs above Poole Bay, there are several small valleys, called "Chines", leading down to the seafront. The appellation "Chine" is peculiar to the Hampshire and Dorset coast, from Walkford to the Purbecks, and also to the Isle of Wight, and describes a deep wooded ravine, with, or without a stream or brook, leading to the sea.
