= South Leicestershire =

UK Parliament constituency (1832–1885, 2010 onwards)

Coordinates: 52.50°N 1.20°W

- County constituency for the House of Commons
- first contested at the 2024 United Kingdom general election, since when it has been represented in the House of Commons of the UK Parliament by Peter Bedford, a Conservative.[2]
- Location within the East Midlands
- County: Leicestershire
- Electorate: 75,634 (March 2020)
- Major settlements: Lutterworth, Whetstone, Narborough and Blaby

Current constituency
- Created: 2010
- Member of Parliament: Alberto Costa (Conservative)
- Seats: One
- Created from: Blaby, Harborough

1832–1885
- Seats: Two
- Created from: Leicestershire
- Replaced by: Bosworth, Harborough

South Leicestershire is a constituency represented in the House of Commons of the UK Parliament since 2015 by Alberto Costa, a member of the Conservative Party.

The current constituency has similar boundaries to the previous Blaby constituency. Historically the "Southern Division of Leicestershire", was a county constituency, less formally known as South Leicestershire. From 1832 to 1885 it elected two Members of Parliament (MPs) by the bloc vote system of election.

== Constituency profile ==
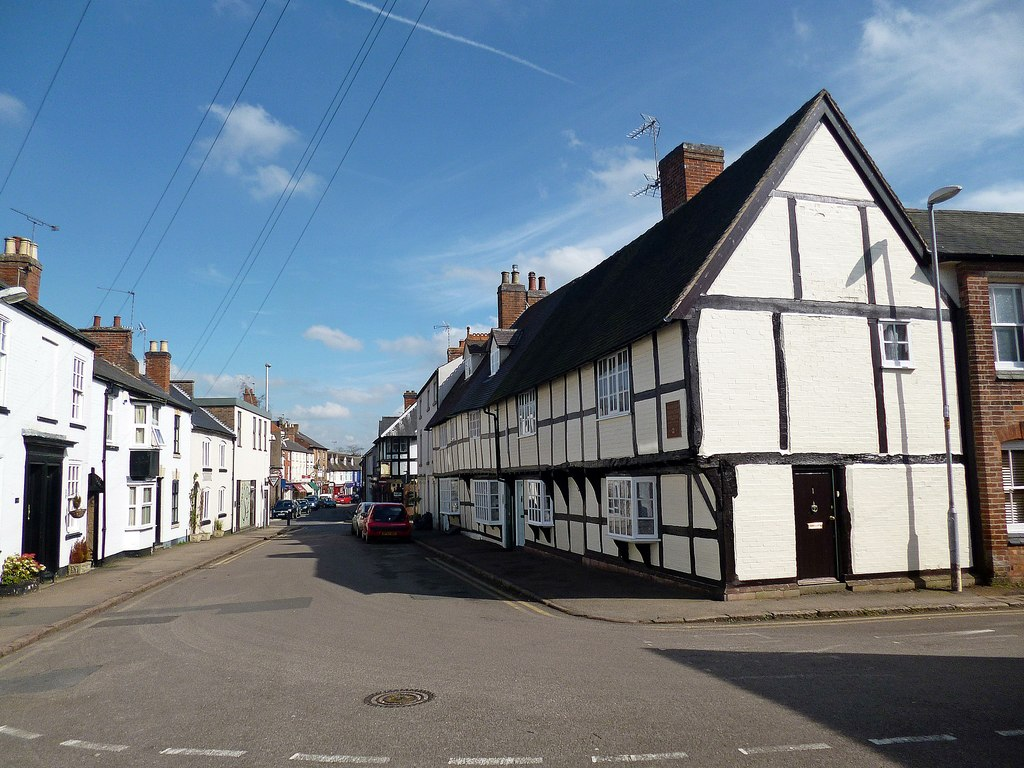
Church Street, Lutterworth

South Leicestershire is a constituency in Leicestershire in the East Midlands of England, covering parts of the Blaby and Harborough districts. It includes the town of Lutterworth and the villages of New Lubbesthorpe, Enderby, Narborough, Glen Parva, Whetstone, Blaby, Cosby, Countesthorpe, Stoney Stanton, Sapcote, Broughton Astley and Fleckney.

This constituency covers suburban commuter villages on the southern edge of Leicester and the rural areas to their south. These villages are highly-affluent with very low levels of deprivation, especially in Broughton Astley and Narborough. The rural areas are mostly agricultural and contain many small villages. The constituency's only town, Lutterworth, is located in this area. It is situated close to the M1 and M6 motorways and is generally considered the centre of the "golden logistics triangle", an area containing a large number of logistics and warehousing facilities. Lutterworth and its surroundings are also wealthy and affluent. House prices across the constituency are generally higher than the rest of the East Midlands but lower than the UK average.

South Leicestershire has an above-average retired population and a below-average proportion of young adults. Residents have high levels of income and homeownership and the child poverty rate is low. They have average levels of education and a high proportion work in the science, retail and transport sectors. The percentage of residents claiming unemployment benefits is half the UK-wide rate. White people made up 94% of the population at the 2021 census.

At the local district council level, most of the suburban villages are represented by Liberal Democrats, the rural villages by Conservatives and Lutterworth by Labour Party representatives. At the county council, most of the constituency elected Reform UK councillors. An estimated 58% of voters in South Leicestershire supported leaving the European Union in the 2016 referendum, higher than the UK-wide figure of 52%.

== Boundaries ==
=== Historic ===
1832–1885: The Hundreds of Gartree (excluding the parishes of Baggrave, Burrough, Knossington, Marefield, Pickwell-cum-Leesthorpe, Ouston, and Newbold-Saucey), Sparkenhoe and Guthlaxton, and the Borough of Leicester and the Liberties thereof.

=== 2010–2024 ===
Following its review of parliamentary representation in Leicestershire, the Boundary Commission for England recommended replacing the Blaby constituency with a new South Leicestershire seat, with some boundary changes. This change occurred for the 2010 general election.

The electoral wards used to create the new constituency were;

- Broughton Astley-Astley, Broughton Astley-Broughton, Broughton Astley-Primethorpe, Broughton Astley-Sutton, Dunton, Lutterworth Brookfield, Lutterworth Orchard, Lutterworth Springs, Lutterworth Swift, Misterton, Peatling, and Ullesthorpe in the Harborough District
- Blaby South, Cosby with South Whetstone, Countesthorpe, Croft Hill, Enderby and St John's, Millfield, Narborough and Littlethorpe, Normanton, North Whetstone, Pastures, Ravenhurst and Fosse, Saxondale, Stanton and Flamville, and Winstanley in the Blaby District

=== Current ===
Further to the 2023 review of Westminster constituencies, which came into effect for the 2024 general election, the composition of the constituency was defined as follows (as they existed on 1 December 2020):

- The District of Blaby wards of: Blaby South; Cosby with South Whetstone; Countesthorpe; Croft Hill; Enderby and St. John’s; Narborough and Littlethorpe; Normanton; North Whetstone; Pastures; Saxondale; Stanton and Flamville.
- The District of Harborough wards of: Bosworth; Broughton Astley-Primethorpe & Sutton; Broughton Astley South & Leire; Dunton; Fleckney; Lutterworth East; Lutterworth West; Misterton; Ullesthorpe.

The Blaby District wards of Millfield, Ravenhurst and Fosse, and Winstanley (comprising the community of Braunstone Town) were transferred to the new constituency of Mid Leicestershire; the Harborough District wards of Bosworth and Fleckney were transferred in from Harborough.

Following a local government boundary review in Blaby which came into effect in May 2023, the constituency now comprises the following from the 2024 general election:

- The District of Blaby wards of: Blaby; Cosby & South Whetstone; Countesthorpe; Enderby; Fosse Highcross; Fosse Normanton; Fosse Stoney Cove; Glen Parva; Narborough & Littlethorpe; North Whetstone; and a small part of Leicester Forest & Lubbesthorpe.
- The District of Harborough wards of: Bosworth; Broughton Astley-Primethorpe & Sutton; Broughton Astley South & Leire; Dunton; Fleckney; Lutterworth East; Lutterworth West; Misterton; Ullesthorpe.

== History ==
=== 1832–1885 ===
The constituency was created by the Reform Act 1832 for the 1832 general election, when the two-seat Leicestershire constituency was replaced by the Northern and Southern divisions, each of which elected two MPs.

Both divisions of the county were abolished by the Redistribution of Seats Act 1885 for the 1885 general election, when they were replaced by four new single-seat constituencies: Bosworth, Harborough, Loughborough and Melton.

Prominent members in this period included Thomas Paget (Jnr) (1807–1892) who followed the footsteps of his father in this role (his father having represented Leicestershire) and as partner in Leicester Bank, and Albert Pell, a member of a group of MPs, which included Henry Chaplin, Sir Massey Lopes and Clare Sewell Read, who supported farming interests. He was also a member of the Council of the Royal Agricultural Society of England.

== Members of Parliament ==
=== MPs 1832–1885 ===
Leicestershire prior to 1832

Election	1st Member	1st Party	2nd Member	2nd Party
1832	Edward Dawson	Whig	Sir Henry Halford, Bt	Tory
1834	Edward Dawson	Whig	Sir Henry Halford, Bt	Conservative
1835	Thomas Frewen Turner	Conservative	Sir Henry Halford, Bt	Conservative
1836 by-election	Charles Packe	Conservative	Sir Henry Halford, Bt	Conservative
1857	Charles Packe	Conservative	Viscount Curzon	Conservative
1867 by-election	Thomas Paget	Liberal	Viscount Curzon	Conservative
1868	Albert Pell	Conservative	Viscount Curzon	Conservative
1870 by-election	Albert Pell	Conservative	William Unwin Heygate	Conservative
1880	Albert Pell	Conservative	Thomas Paget	Liberal
1885	Redistribution of Seats Act: constituency abolished			

=== MPs since 2010 ===
Blaby and Harborough prior to 2010

Election	Member	Party
2010	Andrew Robathan	Conservative
2015	Alberto Costa	Conservative

== Elections ==
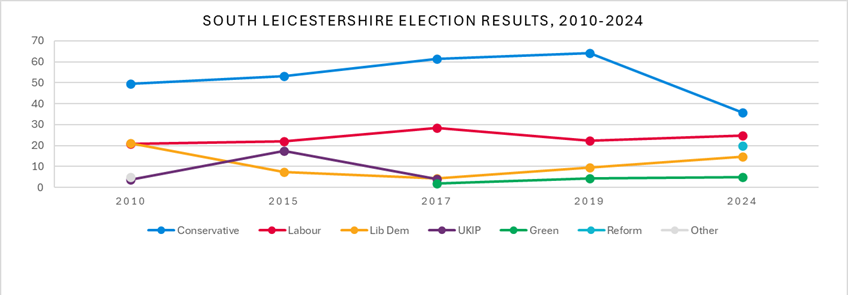
South Leicestershire election results 2010–2024

=== Elections in the 2020s ===
General election 2024: South Leicestershire
Party	Candidate	Votes	%	±%
Conservative	Alberto Costa	18,264	35.6	−30.9
Labour	Robert Parkinson	12,758	24.8	+4.9
Reform	Bill Piper	10,235	19.9	New
Liberal Democrats	Paul Hartshorn	7,621	14.8	+5.2
Green	Mike Jelfs	2,481	4.8	+0.8
Majority		5,508	10.8	−30.9
Turnout		51,359	65.6	−5.8
Registered electors		78,543		
Conservative hold		Swing	−15.5	

=== Elections in the 2010s ===
General election 2019: South Leicestershire
Party	Candidate	Votes	%	±%
Conservative	Alberto Costa	36,791	64.0	+2.6
Labour	Tristan Koriya	12,787	22.3	−6.2
Liberal Democrats	Phil Knowles	5,452	9.5	+5.3
Green	Nick Cox	2,439	4.2	+2.3
Majority		24,004	41.7	+8.8
Turnout		57,469	71.4	−0.4
Conservative hold		Swing	+4.4	

General election 2017: South Leicestershire
Party	Candidate	Votes	%	±%
Conservative	Alberto Costa	34,795	61.4	+8.2
Labour	Shabbir Aslam	16,164	28.5	+6.5
Liberal Democrats	Greg Webb	2,403	4.2	−3.2
UKIP	Roger Helmer	2,235	3.9	−13.5
Green	Mary Morgan	1,092	1.9	New
Majority		18,631	32.9	+1.7
Turnout		56,801	71.8	+1.6
Conservative hold		Swing	+0.9	

General election 2015: South Leicestershire
Party	Candidate	Votes	%	±%
Conservative	Alberto Costa	28,700	53.2	+3.7
Labour	Amanda Hack	11,876	22.0	+1.1
UKIP	Barry Mahoney	9,363	17.4	+13.8
Liberal Democrats	Geoffrey Welsh	3,987	7.4	−13.6
Majority		16,824	31.2	+2.7
Turnout		53,926	70.2	−1.0
Conservative hold		Swing	+1.3	

General election 2010: South Leicestershire
Party	Candidate	Votes	%	±%
Conservative	Andrew Robathan*	27,000	49.5	+4.1
Liberal Democrats	Aladdin Ayesh	11,476	21.0	+2.0
Labour	Sally Gimson	11,392	20.9	−8.8
BNP	Peter Preston	2,721	5.0	+1.5
UKIP	John Williams	1,988	3.6	+1.2
Majority		15,524	28.5	
Turnout		54,577	71.2	+6.0
Conservative win (new seat)				

* Served as an MP in the 2005–2010 Parliament

== Elections 1832–1880 ==
=== Elections in the 1830s ===
General election 1832: South Leicestershire (2 seats)
Party	Candidate	Votes	%
Tory	Henry Halford	Unopposed	
Whig	Edward Dawson	Unopposed	
Registered electors		4,125	
Tory win (new seat)			
Whig win (new seat)			

General election 1835: South Leicestershire (2 seats)
Party	Candidate	Votes	%
Conservative	Henry Halford	Unopposed	
Conservative	Thomas Frewen Turner	Unopposed	
Registered electors		4,244	
Conservative hold			
Conservative gain from Whig			

By-election, 18 February 1836: South Leicestershire
Party	Candidate	Votes	%
Conservative	Charles Packe	Unopposed	
Conservative hold			

- Caused by Turner's resignation

General election 1837: South Leicestershire (2 seats)
Party	Candidate	Votes	%
Conservative	Henry Halford	Unopposed	
Conservative	Charles Packe	Unopposed	
Registered electors		4,603	
Conservative hold			
Conservative hold			

=== Elections in the 1840s ===
General election 1841: South Leicestershire (2 seats)
Party	Candidate	Votes	%	±%
Conservative	Henry Halford	2,638	34.4	N/A
Conservative	Charles Packe	2,622	34.2	N/A
Whig	Thomas Gisborne	1,213	15.8	New
Whig	Edward Hawkins Cheney	1,196	15.6	New
Majority		1,409	18.4	N/A
Turnout		3,835 (est)	78.2 (est)	N/A
Registered electors		4,903		
Conservative hold		Swing	N/A	
Conservative hold		Swing	N/A	

General election 1847: South Leicestershire (2 seats)
Party	Candidate	Votes	%	±%
Conservative	Henry Halford	Unopposed		
Conservative	Charles Packe	Unopposed		
Registered electors		5,448		
Conservative hold				
Conservative hold				

=== Elections in the 1850s ===
General election 1852: South Leicestershire (2 seats)
Party	Candidate	Votes	%	±%
Conservative	Henry Halford	Unopposed		
Conservative	Charles Packe	Unopposed		
Registered electors		5,131		
Conservative hold				
Conservative hold				

General election 1857: South Leicestershire (2 seats)
Party	Candidate	Votes	%	±%
Conservative	George Curzon-Howe	Unopposed		
Conservative	Charles Packe	Unopposed		
Registered electors		5,205		
Conservative hold				
Conservative hold				

General election 1859: South Leicestershire (2 seats)
Party	Candidate	Votes	%	±%
Conservative	George Curzon-Howe	Unopposed		
Conservative	Charles Packe	Unopposed		
Registered electors		5,259		
Conservative hold				
Conservative hold				

=== Elections in the 1860s ===
General election 1865: South Leicestershire (2 seats)
Party	Candidate	Votes	%	±%
Conservative	George Curzon-Howe	Unopposed		
Conservative	Charles Packe	Unopposed		
Registered electors		6,283		
Conservative hold				
Conservative hold				

By-election, 30 November 1867: South Leicestershire (1 seat)
Party	Candidate	Votes	%	±%
Liberal	Thomas Paget	2,302	50.4	New
Conservative	Albert Pell	2,263	49.6	N/A
Majority		39	0.8	N/A
Turnout		4,565	72.7	N/A
Registered electors		6,283		
Liberal gain from Conservative		Swing	N/A	

- Caused by Packe's death.

General election 1868: South Leicestershire (2 seats)
Party	Candidate	Votes	%	±%
Conservative	George Curzon-Howe	3,196	34.9	N/A
Conservative	Albert Pell	3,111	33.9	N/A
Liberal	Thomas Paget	2,861	31.2	N/A
Majority		250	2.7	N/A
Turnout		6,015 (est)	72.4 (est)	N/A
Registered electors		8,308		
Conservative hold		Swing	N/A	
Conservative hold		Swing	N/A	

=== Elections in the 1870s ===
By-election, 13 June 1870: South Leicestershire (1 seat)
Party	Candidate	Votes	%	±%
Conservative	William Unwin Heygate	3,292	56.0	−12.8
Liberal	Thomas Paget	2,585	44.0	+12.8
Majority		707	12.0	+9.3
Turnout		5,877	70.7	−1.7
Registered electors		8,308		
Conservative hold		Swing	−12.8	

- Caused by Curzon-Howe succeeding to the peerage, becoming Earl Howe.

General election 1874: South Leicestershire (2 seats)
Party	Candidate	Votes	%	±%
Conservative	Albert Pell	3,583	36.8	+2.9
Conservative	William Unwin Heygate	3,269	33.6	−1.3
Liberal	Thomas Paget	2,883	29.6	−1.6
Majority		386	4.0	+1.3
Turnout		6,309 (est)	74.3 (est)	+1.9
Registered electors		8,489		
Conservative hold		Swing	+1.9	
Conservative hold		Swing	−0.3	

=== Elections in the 1880s ===
General election 1880: South Leicestershire (2 seats)
Party	Candidate	Votes	%	±%
Liberal	Thomas Paget	3,685	35.7	+6.1
Conservative	Albert Pell	3,453	33.5	−3.3
Conservative	William Unwin Heygate	3,175	30.8	−2.8
Majority		510	4.9	N/A
Turnout		6,860 (est)	76.0 (est)	+1.7
Registered electors		9,022		
Liberal gain from Conservative		Swing	+2.9	
Conservative hold		Swing	−3.2	

== See also ==
- Parliamentary constituencies in Leicestershire and Rutland
