= Norman Macleod =

Norman Macleod or MacLeod may refer to:

- Norman MacLeod (The Wicked Man) (1705–1772), Scottish clan chief
- Norman MacLeod (British Army officer) (1754–1801), British soldier and MP for Invernessshire, 1790–1796
- Norman Macleod (Caraid nan Gaidheal) (1783–1862), Scottish churchman and writer
  - Norman Macleod (minister, born 1812), his son, Scottish churchman and writer
- Norman MacLeod of MacLeod (1812–1895), 25th chief of Clan MacLeod
- Norman Macleod Ferrers (1829–1903), British mathematician and university administrator
- Norman Macleod (moderator) (1838–1911), moderator of the General Assembly of the Church of Scotland, 1900
- Norman Magnus MacLeod of MacLeod (1839–1929), 26th chief of Clan MacLeod
- Norman Cranstoun Macleod (1866–1945), Chief Justice of the Bombay High Court
- Norm MacLeod (1904–1951), Australian rules footballer
- Norman Macleod (chess problemist) (1927–1991), chess problemist
- Norman MacLeod (Canadian businessman) (1927–2021), president of the Liberal Party of Canada
- Norman Macleod (musician), Private Maple in Dad's Army stage show
- Norman Macleod (journalist) (born 1967), Scottish television presenter

== See also ==
- Norman Mcleod (disambiguation)
- Norman Lang (bishop) (Norman MacLeod Lang, 1875–1956), Bishop of Leicester
