= Wolrige-Gordon =

Wolrige-Gordon is a surname. Notable people with the surname include:

- John MacLeod of MacLeod (1935–2007), born John Wolrige-Gordon, 29th chief of Clan MacLeod
- Patrick Wolrige-Gordon (1935–2002), Scottish politician

== See also ==
- Gordon (surname)
