= Norman Magnus MacLeod of MacLeod =

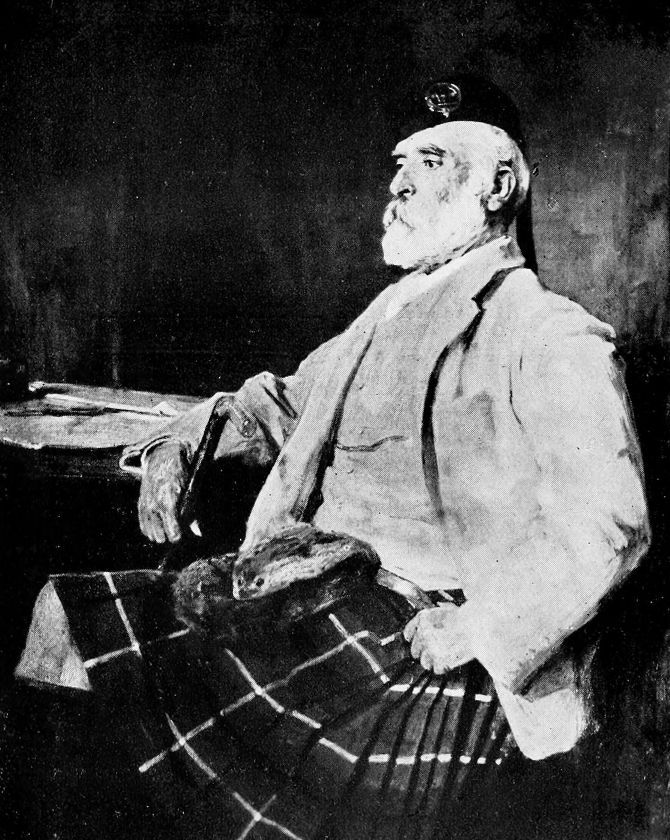
- Norman Magnus MacLeod of MacLeod, before 1906.
- Born: 27 July 1839
- Died: 5 November 1929 (aged 90)
- Title: The 26th Chief of Clan MacLeod
- Predecessor: Norman MacLeod of MacLeod (father)
- Successor: Sir Reginald MacLeod of MacLeod (brother)
- Spouse: Emily Caroline Isham
- Children: Margaret Louisa; Emily Pauline

Norman Magnus MacLeod of MacLeod, CMG (27 July 1839 – 5 November 1929) was the 26th Chief of Clan MacLeod.

== Biography ==
Norman Magnus MacLeod of MacLeod was born on 27 July 1839. He was the eldest son of Norman MacLeod of MacLeod (1812–1898), 25th Chief of Clan MacLeod and his wife Louisa Barbara St John (1818–1880), only daughter of the 14th Baron St John of Bletso.

He was educated at Harrow and in 1858, at the age of 19, was commissioned into the 74th Highlanders, immediately joining the regiment in India. He served as aide de camp to General Sir Hope Grant, Commander in Chief in the Presidency of Madras from 1862 to 1865. He retired from the 74th Highlanders as a Captain in 1872. In 1878, Norman was appointed as political agent on the Transvaal border at the outbreak of the Zulu War. In 1879, he commanded a Swazi army of 8,000 attached with an undetermined number of British officers and NCOs, against the Pedis. The Swazi army decisively defeated the Pedis at the Battle of Wulu.

Norman returned home in 1880 and succeeded his late father as the 26th Chief of MacLeod in 1885. The MacLeod tartan, commonly known as Macleod hunting tartan, was approved by Norman in 1910.

He was appointed a Commissioner of the Congested Districts Board (Scotland) in 1900.

Norman married his cousin, Emily Caroline, daughter of Sir Charles Isham, 10th Baronet in 1881.

They had two daughters, Margaret Louisa and Emily Pauline.

== Succession of the chiefship after his death ==
As Norman had no sons, he was succeeded as clan chief by his younger brother, Sir Reginald, the 27th Chief of MacLeod. Sir Reginald also had no sons and a further brother's only son had been killed in action in 1915. As there were, therefore, no immediate male heirs, Sir Reginald was succeeded by his eldest daughter, Dame Flora MacLeod of MacLeod (1878–1976), 28th Chief of MacLeod and the second female chief of the clan.

== Ancestry ==
Ancestors of Norman Magnus MacLeod of MacLeod

16. John MacLeod of MacLeod, younger
8. Lt-Gen. Norman MacLeod, 23rd of MacLeod
17. Amelia Brodie
4. John Norman MacLeod, 24th of MacLeod, MP
18. Nathaniel Stackhouse, MC
9. Sarah Stackhouse
19. Sarah Simpson
2. Norman MacLeod, 25th of MacLeod
20.
10. John Stephenson
21.
5. Anne Stephenson
22. Capt. James Broadley, RN
11. Mary Broadley
23.
1. Norman Magnus MacLeod, 26th of MacLeod
24. John St. John, 11th Baron St. John of Bletso
12. John St. John, 12th Baron St. John of Bletso
25. Elizabeth Crowley
6. St. Andrew St. John, 14th Baron St. John of Bletso, MP
26. Peter Simond
13. Susanne Louise Simond
27. Susanne Groteste de la Buffière
3. The Hon. Louisa Barbara St. John
28. Shuckburgh Boughton
14. Sir Charles William Rouse-Boughton, 1st and 9th Bt.
29. Mary Greville
7. Louise Rouse-Boughton
30. William Pearce, of Downton Hall
15. Catherine Pearce
31. Catherine Comyn
