= Hugh Magnus MacLeod of MacLeod =

Scottish clan chief

- Born: 1973 (age 52–53); London, England
- Title: The 30th Chief of Clan MacLeod
- Predecessor: John MacLeod of MacLeod (father)

Hugh Magnus MacLeod of MacLeod (born 1973) is the 30th Chief of Clan MacLeod and is currently representing the Associated Clan MacLeod Societies in the Standing Council of Scottish Chiefs. He is also recognised Chief of the Name and Arms of MacLeod, in Scotland and the United Kingdom, by the Court of the Lord Lyon.

On 12 February 2007, Hugh inherited Dunvegan Castle, the ancient seat of the Chiefs of Clan MacLeod, and the associated ancestral clan territories, which still extend to over 42,000 acres (17,000 ha) on the Isle of Skye following the death of his father, John MacLeod of MacLeod.

== Biography ==
Hugh was born in London in 1973.

He attended Michael Hall, a Rudolf Steiner School in East Sussex and later graduated with a BA (Hons) in Film and Modern History from the University of London and the Sorbonne (Erasmus) in 1995.

After a brief period at Sotheby's and Freud Communications, he began working in television as a researcher and was commissioned to direct and produce Champagne and Canvas, a documentary that was nominated for best video at the 1998 BBC British Short Film Festival. Since then, he has worked as a freelance director, producer, and writer in both film and TV, and also combines his media career with the management of the MacLeod Estate which he took on in 2008.

He divides his time between Dunvegan and London.

== Family ==
Hugh married Frédérique Feder, daughter of Serge Feder, on 28 September 2002. The marriage was dissolved by divorce on 25 March 2020.

They have a son, Vincent Liam MacLeod of MacLeod Younger (born 1999).

== Ancestry ==
Ancestors of Hugh Magnus MacLeod of MacLeod

16. Henry Perkins Wolrige
8. Col. John Wolrige-Gordon, 19th of Hallhead and 8th of Esslemont
17. Anne Gordon, 18th of Hallhead and 7th of Esslemont
4. Capt. Robert Wolrige-Gordon, 20th of Hallhead and 9th of Esslemont
18. Capt. William Hervey Woodhouse, of Irnham Hall
9. Isabel Hervey Woodhouse
19. Sarah Ellen Cole
2. John Wolrige-Gordon then MacLeod of MacLeod, younger then MacLeod, 29th of MacLeod
20. John Walter, of Bearwood Park, MP
10. Hubert Walter
21. Flora Macnab
5. Joan Walter
22. Sir Reginald MacLeod, 27th of MacLeod, KCB
11. Dame Flora Louisa Cecilia MacLeod, 28th of MacLeod, DBE
23. Lady Agnes Mary Cecilia Northcote
1. Hugh Magnus MacLeod, 30th of MacLeod
24.
12.
25.
6. Duko Kolin
26.
13.
27.
3. Melita Kolin
28.
14.
29.
7.
30.
15.
31.

== Heraldry ==
Coat of arms of Hugh Magnus MacLeod of MacLeod
Notes The Latin motto, murus aheneus esto, translates into English as "be thou a wall of brass". The 1st and 4th quarters represent Clan MacLeod; the 2nd and 3rd quarters represent the royal Manx heritage of the clan. Adopted Lyon Office 2 June 1962. Crest: Lyon Office January 1943. Crest A bull's head cabossed sable, horned Or, between two flags gules, staves of the first. Escutcheon Quarterly; 1st and 4th, azure, a castles triple-towered and embattled argent, masoned sable, windows and porch gules; 2nd and 3rd, gules, three legs in armour proper, garnished and spurred Or, flexed and conjoined in triangle at the upper part of the thigh. Supporters Two lions reguardant gules, armed and langued azure, each holding a dagger proper. Motto Hold fast (above the crest); murus aheneus esto (on a compartment below the shield).
