= Olive Temple =

Scottish traveller and author (1880–1936)

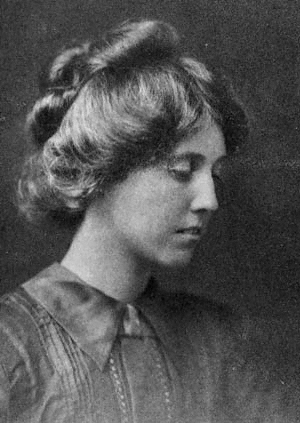
Portrait photograph

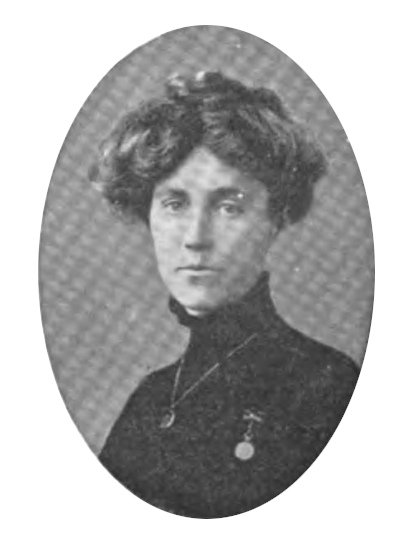
Oval portrait photograph

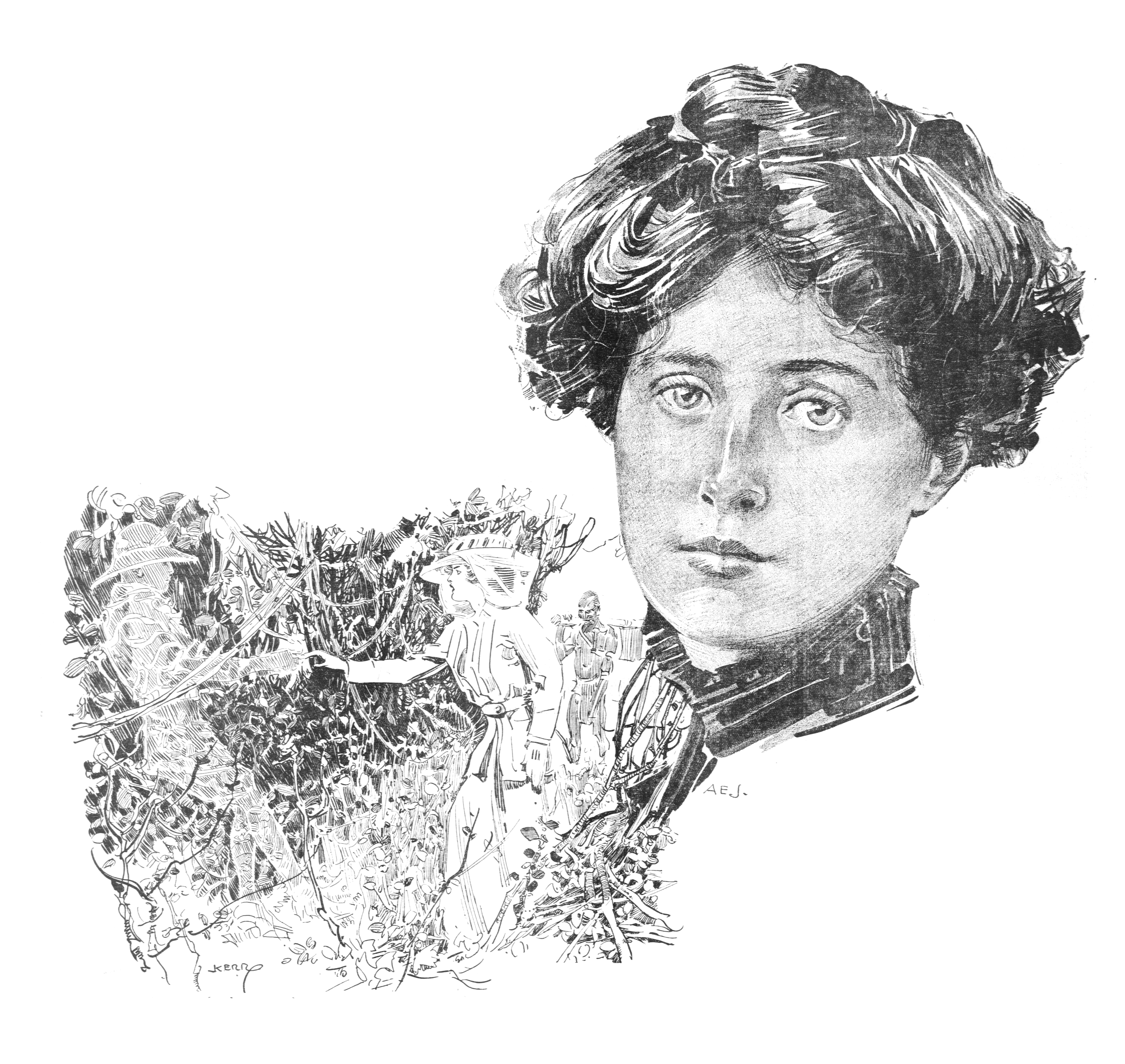
Likeness in the El Paso Herald, 19 October 1913

Olive Susan Miranda Temple (née MacLeod; 18 February 1880 – 16 May 1936) was a Scottish writer and traveller, known for her work in natural history and ethnography. In 1910–1911, she journeyed 6,000 km (3,700 mi) through parts of Africa little known to Europeans to visit her fiancé's grave, and later published a book based on her observations. In Africa, she later met and married the colonial official Charles Lindsay Temple, and wrote a second book about the geography and ethnography of Northern Nigeria. The couple eventually settled in Granada.

== Origins ==
Olive Susan Miranda MacLeod was born on 18 February 1880, the younger daughter of Sir Reginald MacLeod of MacLeod, the Chief of Clan MacLeod, by his wife, Lady Agnes Mary Cecilia, daughter of the 1st Earl of Iddesleigh. Her older sister was Dame Flora MacLeod of MacLeod.

== First journey ==
Olive MacLeod was noted in her day as "one of the most intrepid of lady explorers". Her fiancé, the explorer Lieutenant Boyd Alexander, was murdered in 1910 during a dispute with some local inhabitants while travelling on the borderlands of Wadai to the north-east of Lake Chad. He was buried beside his brother Claud at Maifoni, a British Post near Lake Chad. MacLeod, who was distraught, endeavoured to visit his distant grave. She journeyed roughly 6,000 km (3,700 mi) through Africa, including areas previously unknown to Europeans. Six months of the expedition was spent in country which had never been visited by white women. French colonial authorities later named certain waterfalls after her as a tribute to her courage. MacLeod travelled both on foot and on horseback, and was carried in litters on three days through swampy land.

MacLeod kept many souvenirs of her journey, some of which entered the collection of the Maidstone Museum. She also made many recordings of natural history and ethnographic matters, and published them in her first book, Chiefs and Cities of Central Africa (1912).

== Later life ==
In 1912 MacLeod married Charles Lindsay Temple, who was later Lieutenant-Governor of Northern Nigeria. Her husband's position gave her privileged access to official documents which informed the writing of Notes on the Tribes, Provinces, Emirates and States of the Northern Provinces of Nigeria (1919).

The couple eventually settled in Granada, and there Charles died on 9 January 1929. Olive Temple then returned to Britain, and lived for some time in Kent. She died on 16 May 1936 at Carmen de los Fosos, Granada, and was interred next to her husband in the local cemetery.

== Gallery ==
Chiefs and Cities of Central Africa (1912)

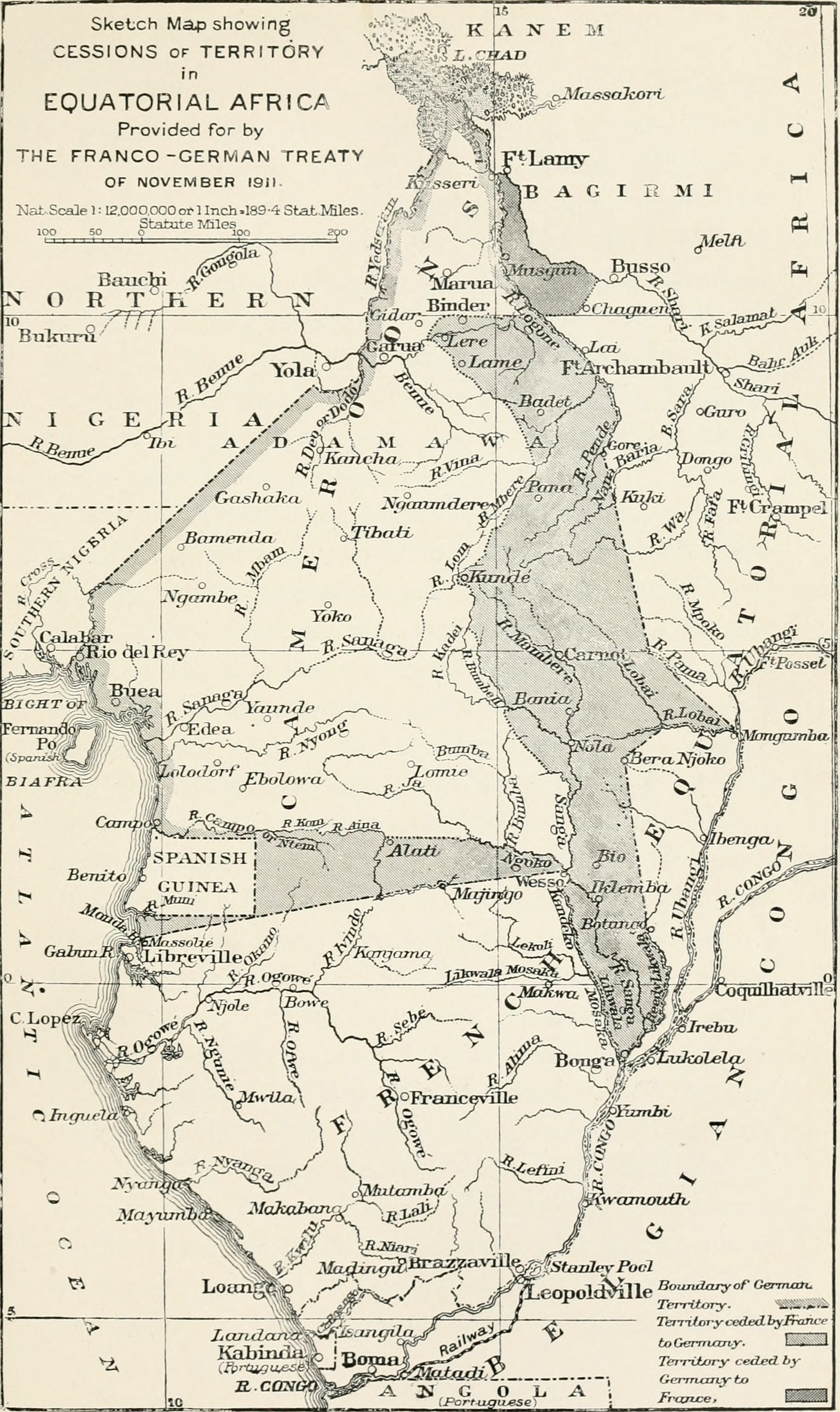
Sketch map showing cessions of territory in Equatorial Africa provided for by the Franco-German Treaty of Nov. 1911

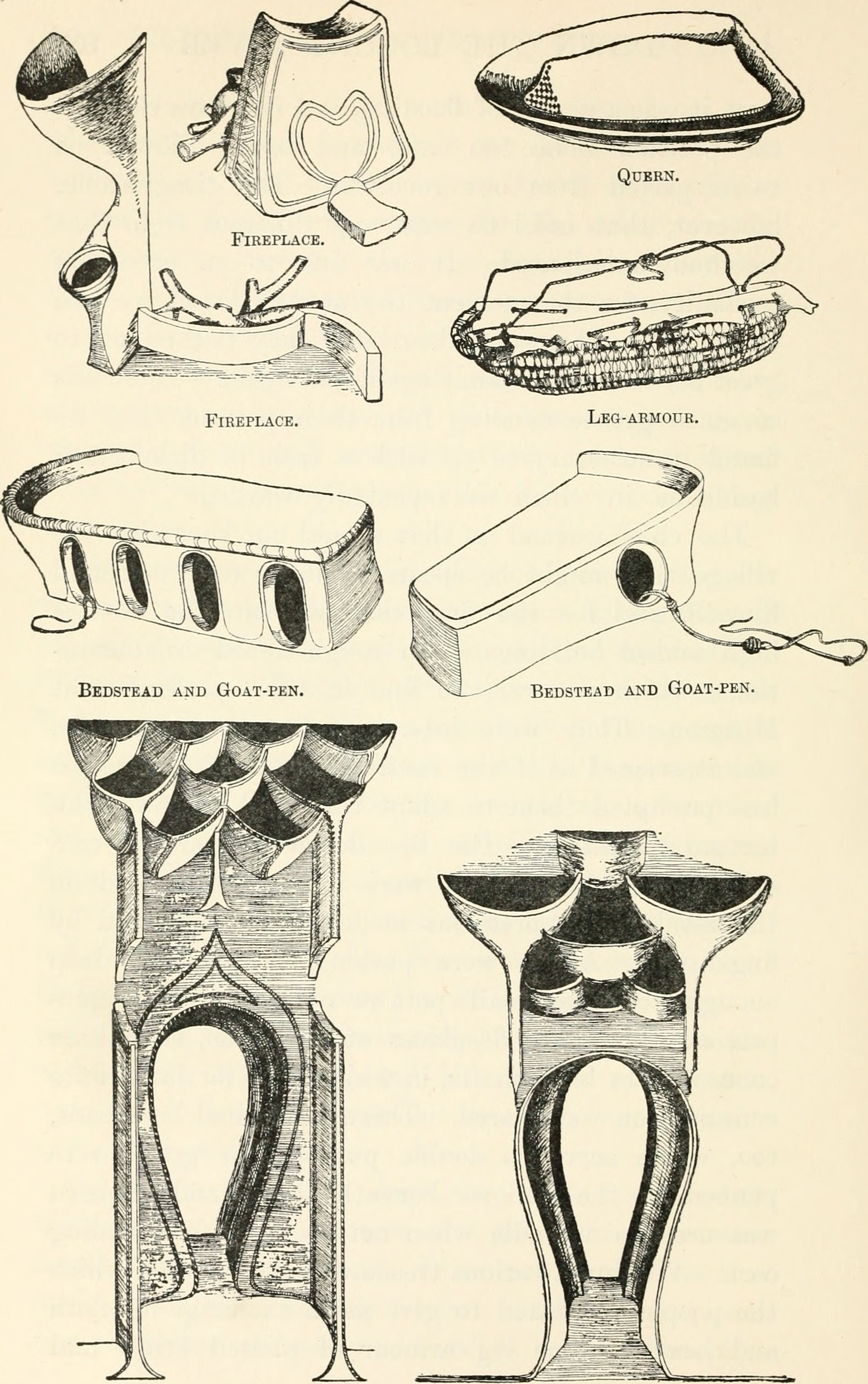
(1, 3) Fireplace (2) Quern (4) Leg-armour (5, 6) Bedstead and goat-pen (7) Banana doorway (8) Doorway

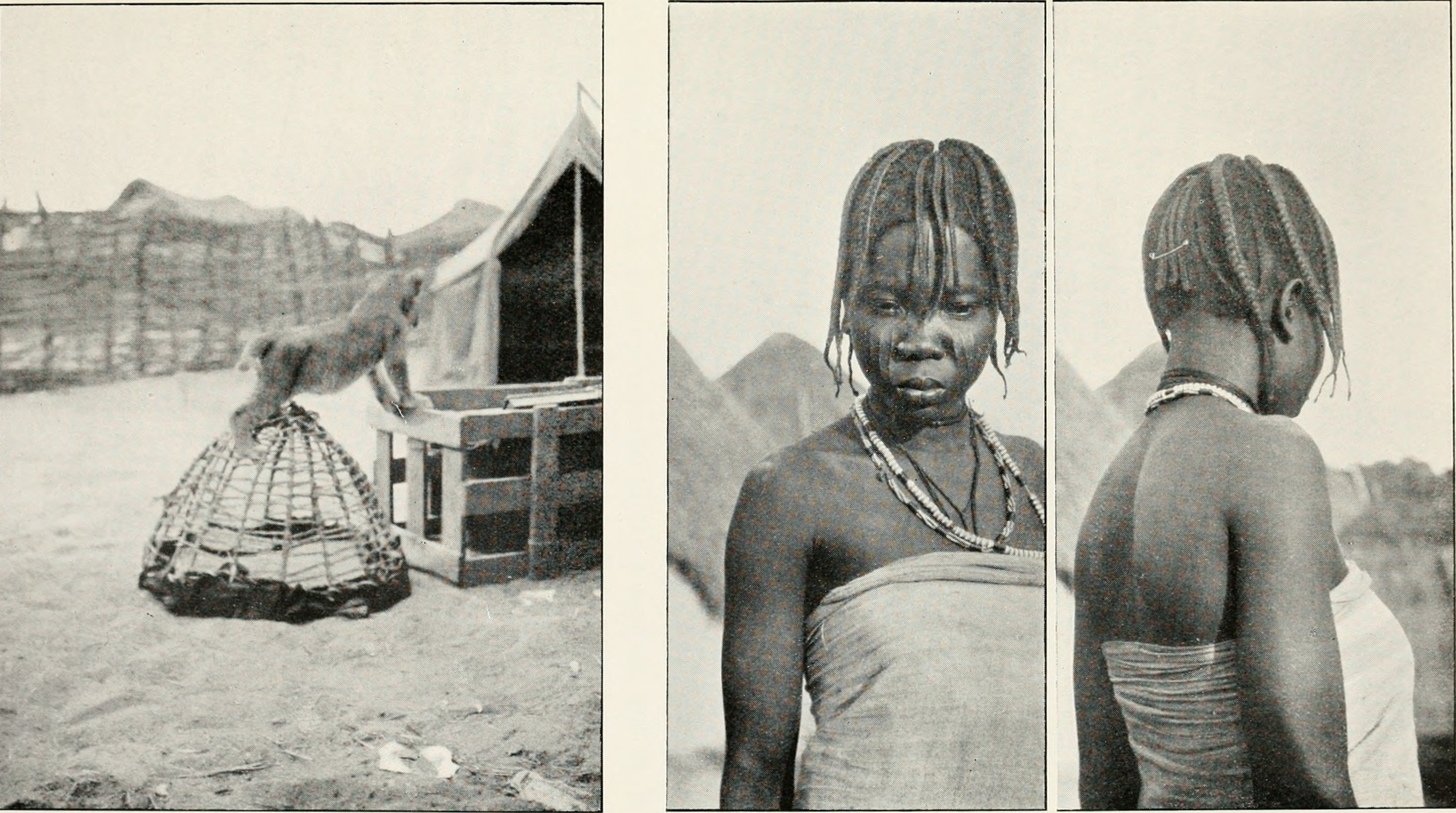
(1) Lamy on his Travelling Cage (2, 3) Type of Kotoko Woman

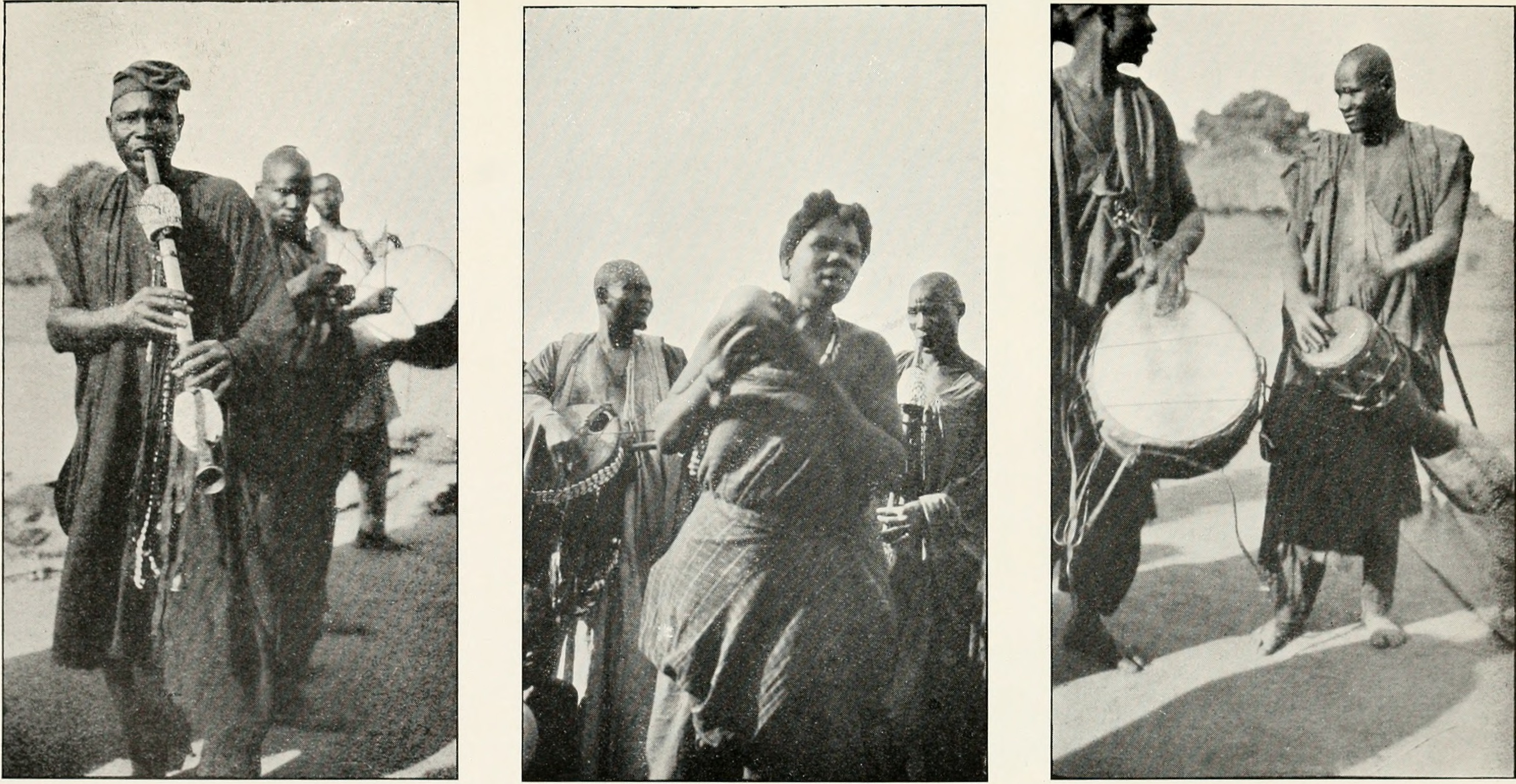
(1) A Kotoko musician (2) A musician playing a calabash rattle (3) Kotoko drummers

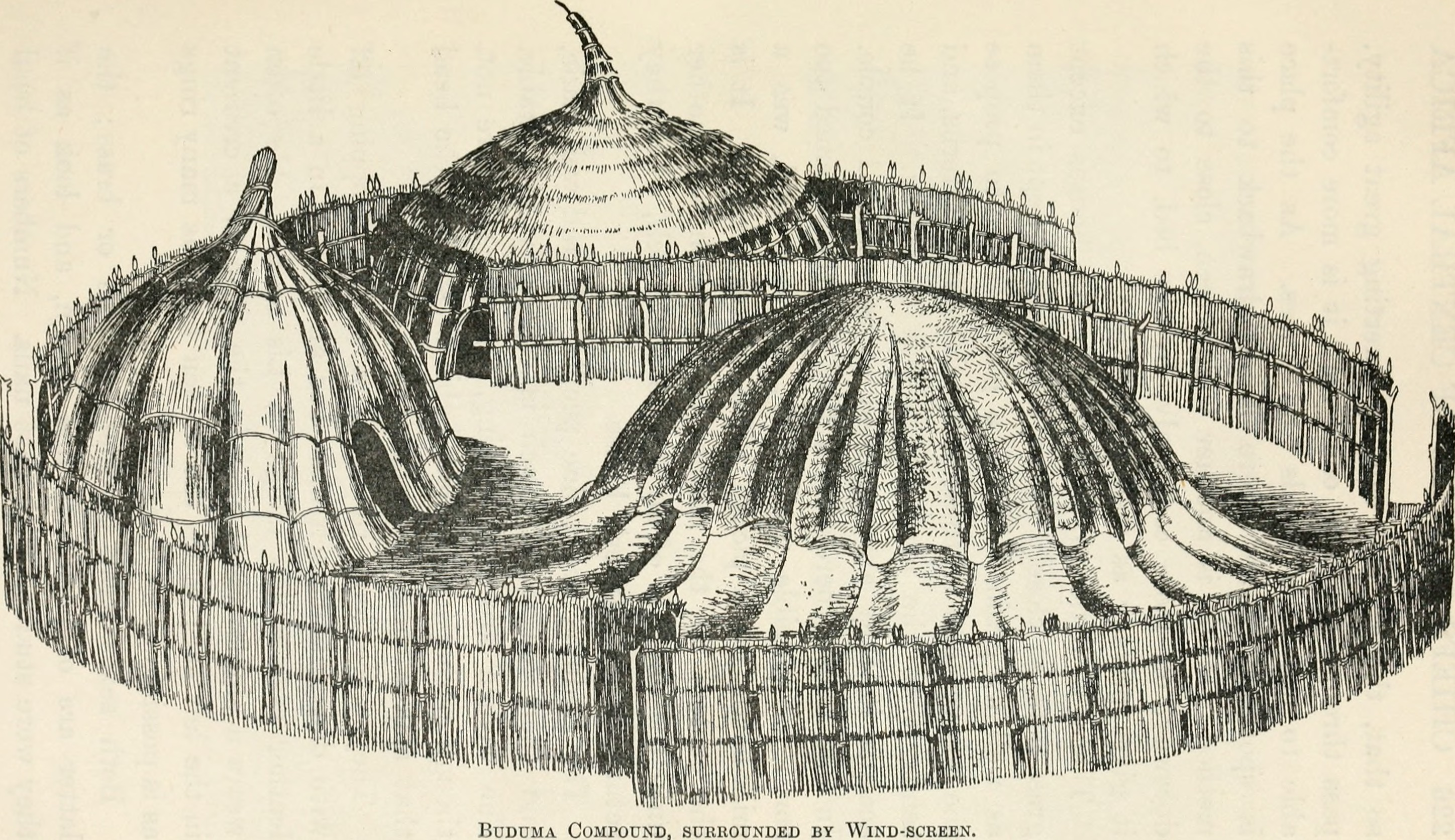
Buduma compound, surrounded by wind-screen

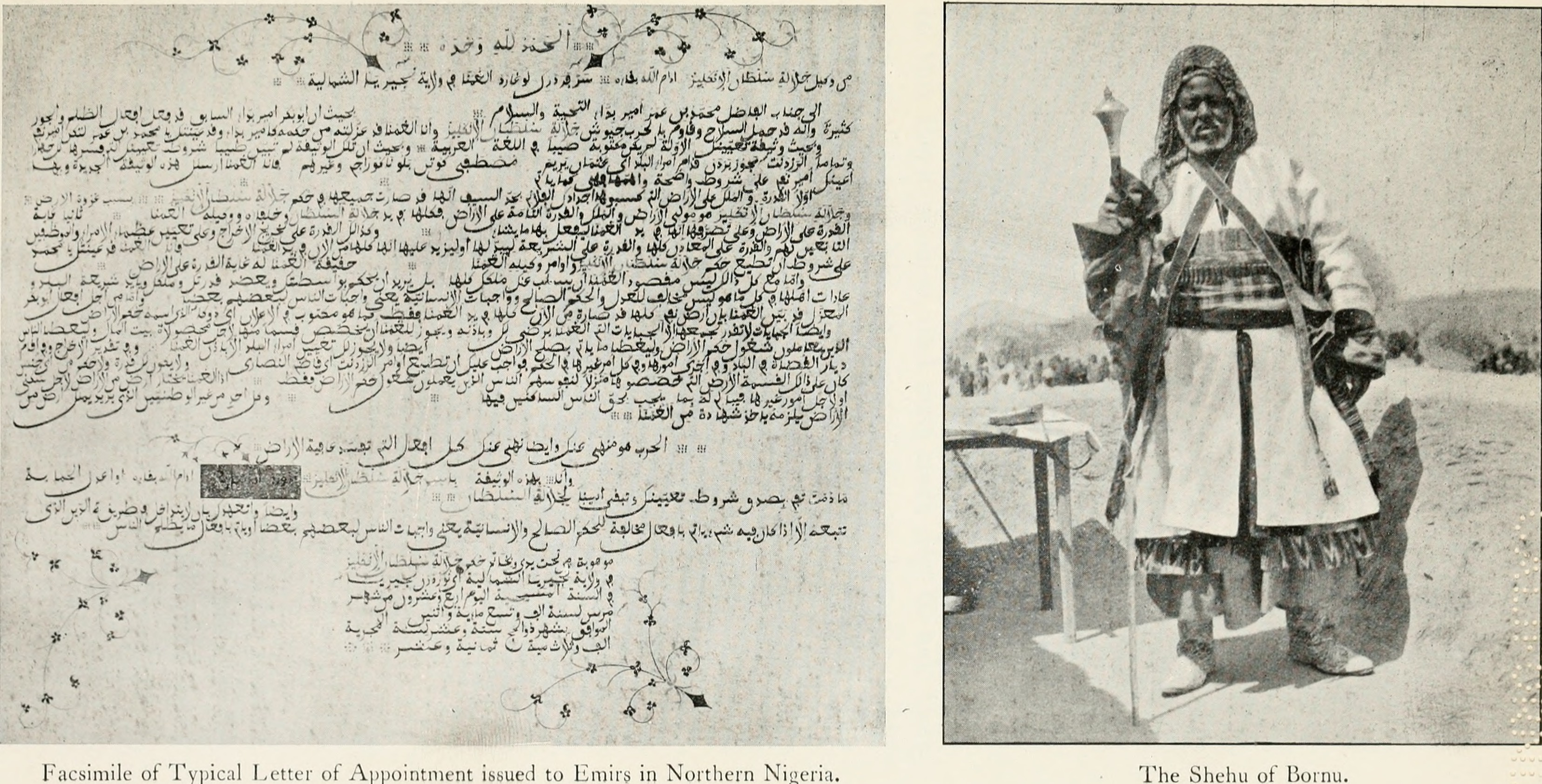
(1) Facsimile of typical letter of appointment issued to Emirs in Northern Nigeria (2) The Shehu of Bornu
