= Reginald MacLeod of MacLeod =

Sir Reginald MacLeod of MacLeod KCB
- Reginald MacLeod of MacLeod, sometime before 1906.
- Born: 1 February 1847
- Died: 20 August 1935 (aged 88)
- Title: The 27th Chief of Clan MacLeod
- Predecessor: Norman Magnus MacLeod of MacLeod (brother)
- Successor: Dame Flora MacLeod of MacLeod (daughter)
- Spouse: Lady Agnes Mary Cecilia Northcote
- Children: 2 daughters: Flora MacLeod of MacLeod; Olive Temple

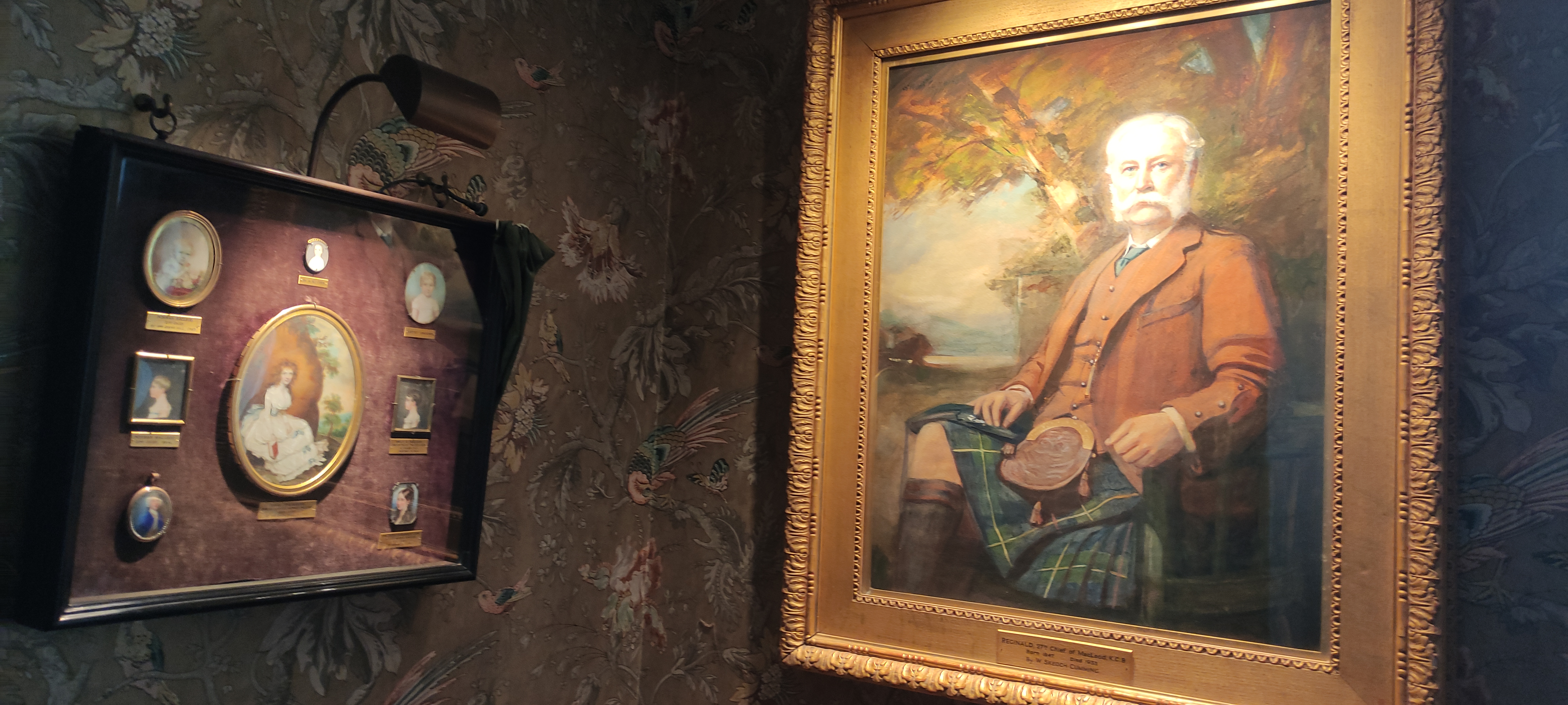
Painting of Reginald 27th Chief of MacLeod in Dunvegan Castle

Sir Reginald MacLeod of MacLeod KCB (1 February 1847 – 20 August 1935) was the 27th Chief of Clan MacLeod.

== Life ==
Sir Reginald MacLeod of MacLeod was born on 1 February 1847. He was the third surviving son of Norman MacLeod of MacLeod (1812–1898), 25th Chief of Clan MacLeod, and his wife Louisa Barbara St John (1818–1880), only daughter of the 14th Baron St John of Bletso. He was educated at Harrow School and Trinity College, Cambridge.

On 17 April 1877, Sir Reginald married Lady Agnes Mary Cecilia Northcote (d. 26 October 1921), the daughter of Sir Stafford Northcote, Chancellor of the Exchequer at the time and later 1st Earl of Iddesleigh, and Cecilia Frances Farrer. They had two daughters.

In the 1885 general election, he stood unsuccessfully for the Conservatives in Inverness-shire losing the seat to an Independent Liberal. In 1889, he became the Queen's and Lord Treasurer's Remembrancer, an office of the Court of the Exchequer which was originally concerned with the recovery of dues, penalties, and debts owed to the Crown. In February 1900, he was appointed the fourth Registrar General, and in this role he presided over the 1901 census. Two years later, in August 1902, he was appointed Permanent Under Secretary for Scotland. He was knighted in 1905. After a further unsuccessful attempt to be elected to Parliament in 1911 he retired from public life and became a director of Shell, the first of several directorships he held.

Sir Reginald became 27th Chief of Clan MacLeod in 1929 on the death of his elder brother Norman Magnus. Sir Reginald was the laird of the islands of St Kilda in 1930, when the last inhabitants left the islands. In 1931, he sold the islands to Lord Dumfries, later Marquess of Bute. The famous Fairy Flag of the MacLeod's was mounted by Sir Reginald. An expert from the Victoria and Albert Museum discussed with Sir Reginald the possible origins of the flag, avoiding reference to the supernatural. Sir Reginald listened and said, "You may believe that, but I know that it was given to my ancestor by the fairies."

== Family ==
His daughter Olive was noted for her journey of 3,700 miles (6,000 km) into the heart of Africa in 1910–1911 to visit her fiancé's grave. The MacLeod waterfalls on the Moa Kabi river are named after her. She went on to marry Charles Lindsay Temple, who was later Lieutenant-Governor of Northern Nigeria.

== Succession ==
Sir Reginald's elder brothers had both died without male issue and his younger brother's only son, Iain Breac, had been killed in action in the trenches near Neuve Chapelle on 17th April 1915. As there were no immediate male heirs, he was succeeded by his eldest daughter Dame Flora MacLeod of MacLeod (1878–1976), 28th Chief of MacLeod and the second female chief of the clan.

== Ancestry ==
Ancestors of Reginald MacLeod of MacLeod

16. John MacLeod of MacLeod Younger
8. Lt-Gen. Norman MacLeod, 23rd of MacLeod
17. Amelia Brodie
4. John Norman MacLeod, 24th of MacLeod, MP
18. Nathaniel Stackhouse, MC
9. Sarah Stackhouse
19. Sarah Simpson
2. Norman MacLeod, 25th of MacLeod
20.
10. John Stephenson
21.
5. Anne Stephenson
22. Capt. James Broadley, RN
11. Mary Broadley
23.
1. Sir Reginald MacLeod, 27th of MacLeod, KCB
24. John St John, 11th Baron St John of Bletso
12. John St John, 12th Baron St John of Bletso
25. Elizabeth Crowley
6. St Andrew St John, 14th Baron St John of Bletso, MP
26. Peter Simond
13. Susanne Louise Simond
27. Susanne Groteste de la Buffière
3. The Hon. Louisa Barbara St John
28. Shuckburgh Boughton
14. Sir Charles William Rouse Boughton 1st and 9th Bt.
29. Mary Greville
7. Louisa Rouse Boughton
30. William Pearce, of Downton Hall
15. Catherine Pearce
31. Catherine Comyn
