= Maitland Mackie =

- Born: 16 February 1912
- Died: 18 June 1996 (aged 84)
- Other name: Mike Mackie
- Education: University of Aberdeen (BSc in Agriculture, 1933)
- Alma mater: Aberdeen Grammar School
- Occupations: politician farming pioneer educational innovator
- Political party: Liberal
- Spouses: Isobel Ross (m. 1935; died 1960) Pauline Turner (m. 1963; died 1993)
- Children: 2 sons and 4 daughters
- Parents: Dr Maitland Mackie (father); Mary Yull (mother)
- Relatives: John Mackie, George Mackie (brothers)

Sir Maitland Mackie CBE KStJ DL JP (16 February 1912 – 18 June 1996) was a British Liberal Party politician, farming pioneer, educational innovator and Lord-Lieutenant of Aberdeenshire.

== Background and family ==
He was the son of Dr Maitland Mackie OBE and Mary Yull. He attended Aberdeen Grammar School before graduating from the University of Aberdeen with a BSc in Agriculture in 1933. He married Isobel Ross in 1935 and they had two sons and four daughters. He celebrated his silver wedding with her before her death in 1960. In 1963, he married a Texan, Pauline Turner, who died in 1993. The Mackie family is best known for its ownership of the 'Mackie's of Scotland' ice cream company. His younger brothers were John Mackie who served as Labour MP and George Yull Mackie who became a Liberal MP, both subsequently entering the House of Lords. His son, Maitland Mackie, CBE, was Chairman of Mackies Scotland until his death in May 2014, while his grandson, Maitland (Mac) Mackie is the current managing director.

== Professional career ==
In 1932 he started farming. In 1950 he toured America and Canada as an agricultural speaker for British Information Services. He pioneered the use of silage in Scottish dairy farming and was the first man north of the River Tay to own a combine harvester. A scholarship worth £1,000 in Sir Maitland's name was established at the University of Aberdeen School of Biological Sciences. The scholarship is awarded to students who can demonstrate promise in the field of Animal Production for the Food Industry or Rural Land-use and the Environment.

== Political career ==
He was Vice-chairman of Aberdeen Youth Council. He was a district commissioner of the scout movement. He was elected to Aberdeenshire County Council in 1951 and served for fifteen years as chairman of the education committee which earned him a Fellowship of the Educational Institute of Scotland. He was Liberal Party parliamentary candidate for West Aberdeenshire at the 1951 General Election;

General Election 1951: West Aberdeenshire Electorate 41,078
Party	Candidate	Votes	%	±%
Unionist	Henry Reginald Spence	17,761	55.2	
Labour	Norman Hogg	7,278	22.6	
Liberal	Maitland Mackie	7,128	22.2	
Majority		10,483	32.6	
Turnout			78.3	
Unionist hold		Swing		

He was Liberal party parliamentary candidate for Aberdeenshire East in the 1958 East Aberdeenshire by-election.

1958 Aberdeenshire East by-election Electorate
Party	Candidate	Votes	%	±%
Unionist	Patrick Wolrige-Gordon	14,314	48.5	
Labour	John B Urquhart	7,986	27.1	
Liberal	Maitland Mackie	7,153	24.3	
Majority		6,328	21.5	
Turnout		29,485		
Unionist hold		Swing		

He was appointed a CBE in 1965. He was chairman of Aberdeen District Milk Marketing Board from 1965 to 1982. He was a governor of the North of Scotland College of Agriculture from 1968 to 1982. He was the first chairman of the North East of Scotland Development Authority from 1969 to 1975. As chair of the North East of Scotland Development Authority he worked hard to encourage the international oil industry in the area. He headed the first Scottish trade mission to Houston, Texas. He was knighted in the 1982 Birthday Honours.

Sir Maitland's autobiography, A Lucky Chap was published in 1993.

Honorary titles
Preceded by David Gordon, 4th Marquess of Aberdeen and Temair	Lord Lieutenant of Aberdeenshire; 1975–1987	Succeeded by Colin Farquharson
