= John MacLeod of MacLeod =

Chief of the Scottish Clan MacLeod

- Born: John Wolrige-Gordon; 10 August 1935; Ellon, Aberdeenshire
- Died: 12 February 2007 (aged 71); London, England
- Title: The 29th Chief of Clan MacLeod
- Predecessor: Flora MacLeod of MacLeod (grandmother)
- Successor: Hugh Magnus MacLeod of MacLeod (son)
- Spouses: Drusilla Mary Shaw (m. 1961; div. 1971) Melita Kolin (m. 1973; div. 1992) Ulrika Magdalena Tham (m. 2004)
- Children: Stephan; Hugh Magnus; Elena Mary Nadezhda

John MacLeod of MacLeod, born John Wolrige-Gordon (10 August 1935 – 12 February 2007), was the 29th Chief of Clan MacLeod. Faced with the need for expensive repairs to the clan's seat at Dunvegan Castle on the Isle of Skye, his proposed methods to raise funds caused considerable controversy. His twin brother, Patrick Wolrige-Gordon (1935–2002), was MP for East Aberdeenshire.

== Biography ==
John was born as John Wolrige-Gordon in Ellon, Aberdeenshire, on 10 August 1935. He was the elder of the twin sons of Captain Robert Wolrige-Gordon, MC and his wife Joan Walter. His mother, Joan, was the daughter of Dame Flora MacLeod of MacLeod, the 28th Chief of Clan MacLeod and a direct descendant of John Walter, founder of The Times. His younger twin brother, Patrick Wolrige-Gordon, would later become a Tory Member of Parliament. The twins had an older brother, Captain Robert Wolrige-Gordon, who would later succeed their father as the 21st Laird of Hallhead, 10th Baron of Esslemont.

John was educated at Cheam School, Eton College, McGill University and the London Academy of Music and Dramatic Art. He started a career in acting and singing after National Service in the Black Watch Regiment.

In 1951, he was named heir to his grandmother, changed his surname to MacLeod of MacLeod, and was recognised by the Lord Lyon King of Arms as John MacLeod of MacLeod, Younger. He matriculated arms at Lyon Office in 1962. He later succeeded as Chief of Clan MacLeod in 1976. In 2000, faced with the high cost of repairs to Dunvegan Castle, his clan's seat for more than 800 years, he put the Black Cuillin range in Skye on the market for £10 million. He also planned to build an 80-bedroom hotel on his Skye estate with the proceeds of the sale. The planned sale caused outrage at the time and was never completed. He had also considered transferring the range to a charitable trust for public ownership.

== Family ==
John married Drusilla Mary Shaw, daughter of actor Sebastian Shaw, on 25 July 1961. The marriage was dissolved by divorce, without issue, on 31 March 1971. He had a natural son, Stephan, born in 1971. On 19 March 1973, he married Melita Kolin, daughter of Duko Kolin. The couple had two children, Hugh Magnus and Elena Mary Nadezhda, born in 1973 and 1977 respectively. The second marriage was dissolved by divorce, on 28 August 1992. On 27 March 2004, he married Ulrika Magdalena Tham, daughter of Nils Johan Carl-Henrik Tham.

== Cricket ==
During the 1980s, John became a keen playing member of the Poet's and Peasants' Cricket Club, a group of amateurs (largely musicians) that included founding member Bramwell Tovey. The club's poet was Alan Gibson, The Times cricket correspondent and former Test Match Special commentator. Such was John's modesty that few of the members knew about his background until a piece appeared about him in one of the Sunday broadsheets. John was by all accounts a decent batsman and would usually open the batting for the Peasants with a statuesque West Indian named Tony Jenkins who drove trains on London's Central Line. The club was based in Essex and most of the fixtures were played in this county, some considerable distance from John's London home in Chelsea.

== Death and successor ==
On 12 February 2007, John died of leukaemia, aged 71, in London, England. His funeral was held at Duirinish Free Church of Scotland, at Dunvegan. He was buried at the ruined stone church at Kilmuir. John was succeeded by his second son, Hugh Magnus MacLeod, as 30th Chief of Clan MacLeod.

== Ancestry ==
Ancestors of John MacLeod of MacLeod

16. Col. John Wolrige, RM
8. Henry Perkins Wolrige
17. Mary Anne Knox
4. Col. John Wolrige-Gordon, 19th of Hallhead and 8th of Esslemont
18. Maj. Robert Gordon, 17th of Hallhead and 5th of Esslemont
9. Anne Gordon, 18th of Hallhead and 7th of Esslemont
19. Jane Gilmour
2. Capt. Robert Wolrige-Gordon, 20th of Hallhead and 9th of Esslemont
20. William Woodhouse, of Toxteth Park
10. Capt. William Hervey Woodhouse, of Irnham Hall
21. Sarah Dorothy Hervey
5. Isabel Hervey Woodhouse
22. William Cole
11. Sarah Ellen Cole
23.
1. John Wolrige-Gordon then MacLeod of MacLeod, younger then MacLeod, 29th of MacLeod
24. John Walter, of Bearwood Park
12. John Walter, of Bearwood Park, MP
25. Mary Smythe
6. Hubert Walter
26. James Munro Macnab
13. Flora Macnab
27. Jane Mary Campbell
3. Joan Walter
28. Norman MacLeod, 25th of MacLeod
14. Sir Reginald MacLeod, 27th of MacLeod, KCB
29. The Hon. Louisa Barbara St. John
7. Dame Flora Louisa Cecilia MacLeod, 28th of MacLeod, DBE
30. Stafford Henry Northcote, 1st Earl of Iddesleigh
15. Lady Agnes Mary Cecilia Northcote
31. Cecilia Frances Farrer, CI

== Heraldry ==
Coat of arms of John MacLeod of MacLeod
Notes The Latin motto, murus aheneus esto, translates into English as "be thou a wall of brass". The 1st and 4th quarters represent the MacLeod family; the 2nd and 3rd quarters represent the royal Manx heritage of the clan. Adopted Lyon Office 2 June 1962. Crest: Lyon Office January 1943. Crest A bull's head cabossed sable, horned Or, between two flags gules, staves of the first. Escutcheon Quarterly; 1st and 4th, azure, a castles triple-towered and embattled argent, masoned sable, windows and porch gules; 2nd and 3rd, gules, three legs in armour proper, garnished and spurred Or, flexed and conjoined in triangle at the upper part of the thigh. Supporters Two lions reguardant gules, armed and langued azure, each holding a dagger proper. Motto Hold fast (above the crest); murus aheneus esto (on a compartment below the shield).
