= Ship of the People =

18th-century Scottish ship involved in human trafficking

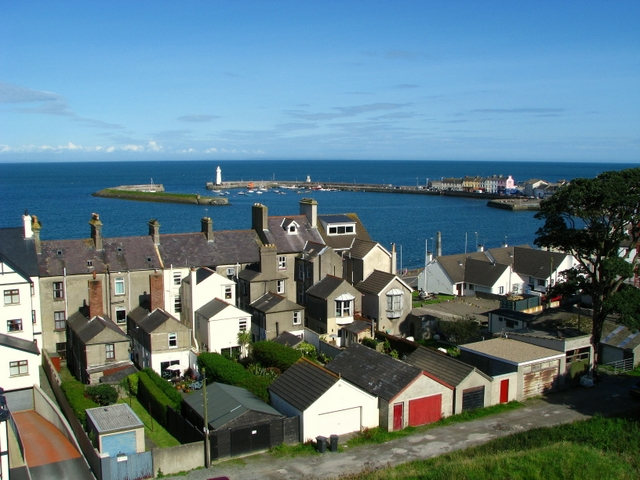
Donaghadee in modern-day Northern Ireland, where the William landed with her human cargo in 1740

The Ship of the People (Scottish Gaelic: Soitheach nan daoine) is a moniker given to the Irish ship William, which played a key role in a Scottish human trafficking scandal in 1740, when over a hundred men, women and children were kidnapped from the Hebrides with the intention of selling them as indentured servants (Note: Various sources such as MacKenzie (1903), MacDonald (1978) and Warner (2019) erroneously refer to the would-be indentured servants as '(white) slaves'.) in the Thirteen Colonies. The scheme was devised by Norman MacLeod of MacLeod, chief of Clan MacLeod, who was in deep debt at the time, and Sir Alexander MacDonald, chief of Clan MacDonald of Sleat, and was carried out by tacksman Norman MacLeod of Unish and skipper William Davidson. En route to America, a landing in Ireland was made, where several victims attempted to escape, alerting local authorities and attracting the attention of the British government. The chiefs MacLeod and MacDonald successfully denied involvement in the incident and escaped prosecution, while the victims of the scheme were set free and mainly settled in Ireland for the remainder of their lives.

== Background ==
The last chief of Clan MacLeod to live full time at Dunvegan Castle in the Isle of Skye, their traditional centre of power, was John 'the Speckled' (Iain Breac), who died in 1693. Subsequent chiefs lived as absentee landlords to their estates in the Scottish Highlands, who continued the trend starting with John of living lavish lifestyles at the expense of their clansmen. Norman MacLeod, who was clan chief since the death of his father at age 1 in 1707, became the most extravagant spender of these absentee chiefs when he came of age, and accumulated a large number of debts which threatened to bankrupt him and his estate.

In early 18th century Scotland, the illicit selling of clansmen into indentured servitude under trumped-up charges by illicit chiefs was a known business. English soldier Edmund Burt, who was stationed in the Highlands during this time, wrote, "it has been whispered their Crimes were only asking their Dues, and such-like Offences; and I have been well assured, they have been threatened with hanging, or at least perpetual Imprisonment, to intimidate and force them to sign a Contract for their Banishment." At some point before 1739, Norman, alongside chief Sir Alexander MacDonald of Sleat, planned to kidnap a large number of their own tenants under the pretense of them being criminals. In addition to these chiefs, an identically named MacLeod tacksman, known as Norman MacLeod of Unish to distinguish him from his chief, as well as the skipper William Davidson of the William from Donaghadee in present-day Northern Ireland, were recruited into the plan.

== Kidnapping ==
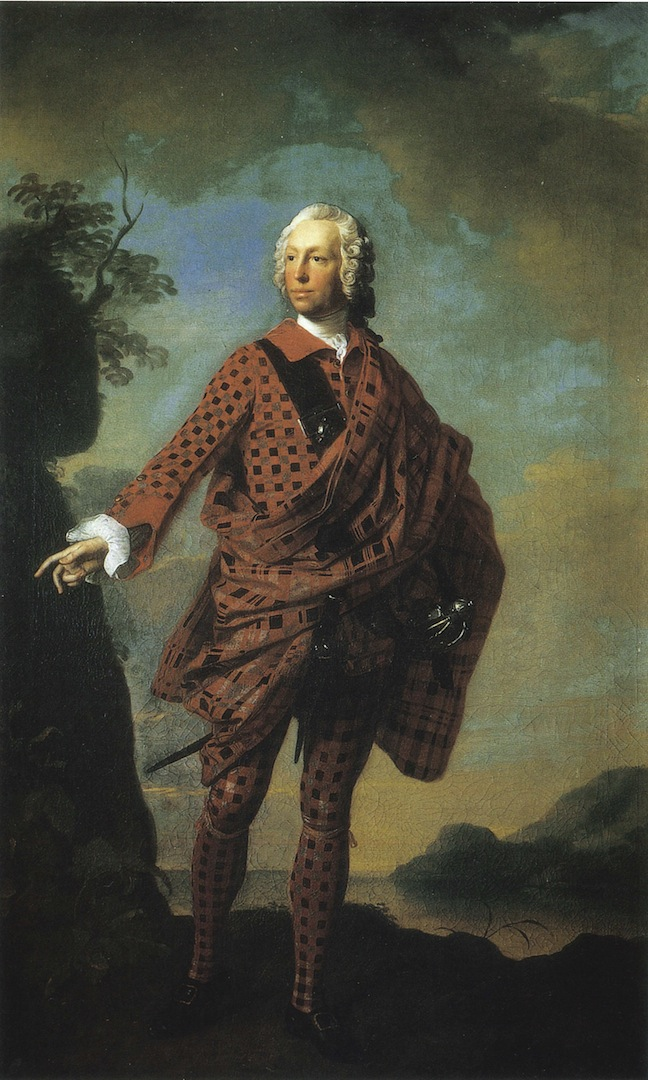
Chief Norman MacLeod in 1747

On 13 August 1740 the William set sail from Donaghadee with the ostensible destination of Norway. In actuality, the ship landed in Bracadale on the coast of the Isle of Skye several days later. On the island, nearly a hundred men, women and children as young as five were forcibly abducted from their homes by Davidson's men, mostly on Norman MacLeod's estates, but some from MacDonald's lands as well. From Skye, the William departed to the Isle of Harris to kidnap more people. After brief stops to disembark people unlikely to survive the trans-Atlantic crossing, the ship stopped once again in Donaghadee on 20 October to procure provisions for the voyage to America. Had the ship arrived at her intended destination, the newly indentured servants would have faced conditions little better than the slavery endured by African-Americans at the time.

While in Ireland, several victims of the scheme attempted to escape to nearby Bangor, but were apprehended by Davidson and MacLeod of Unish, who beat them severely. However, this escape attempt attracted the attention of local authorities, who discovered the prisoners held in barns owned by Davidson. When the magistrates of Donaghadee attempted to arrest the two ringleaders, they escaped and subsequently disappeared. News of the incident reached Scotland, which caused a scandal to break out centred on the two chiefs.

== Aftermath ==
Norman and Sir Alexander both denied their complicity in the Ship of the People scandal. The two chiefs insisted they were legally transporting petty criminals who were allegedly present on the island, and that there were no innocents on board the William. Despite this, both victims and MacLeod of Unish described MacLeod of MacLeod as being its principal organiser. He appealed to Duncan Forbes of Culloden, Lord President of the Court of Session and the senior-most judicial authority in Scotland at the time for aid, insisting on his innocence and emphasising the difficult nature of prosecuting him. Forbes, who was known to drop potentially difficult legal cases, did not charge either chief for their role in kidnapping the tenants, and tacitly aided MacLeod in covering up his role in the incident.

Arrest warrants were issued for MacLeod of Unish and for Davidson, who had disappeared following the scandal. The former eventually settled in the Netherlands. The abduction victims were set free, and settled in and around Donaghadee. Only a few returned to the Hebrides.

== Legacy ==
The Ship of the People scandal nearly destroyed the traditional relationship between Clan MacLeod and its chiefs. It, and other corruption-related scandals involving Norman birthed his moniker of "The Wicked Man", which survived into the 20th century despite attempts by Chieftess Flora MacLeod of MacLeod to rehabilitate his image. 20th century Gaelic poet Sorley MacLean described the incident as a precursor to the Highland Clearances of the 19th century, which saw thousands of Highlanders being driven from their estates by absentee landlords.

During the Jacobite Rebellion of 1745, Norman MacLeod, despite being from a traditionally Jacobite clan, supported the British government, and assured Forbes that he would give 'no sort of countenance' to the Stuarts. He would provide them with vital manpower needed to put down the rebellion, which was defeated in early 1746 at the Battle of Culloden. James Hunter speculated that Norman's support of the Hanoverians partially stemmed from fear of reprisals from Forbes for the incident had he supported the Jacobites.

== See also ==
- Highland Clearances
