= 1958 East Aberdeenshire by-election =

UK Parliamentary by-election

The 1958 East Aberdeenshire by-election was held on 20 November 1958 when the incumbent Conservative MP, Sir Robert Boothby was elevated to a life peerage. The by-election was retained by the Conservative candidate Patrick Wolrige-Gordon. Wolrige-Gordon was still an undergraduate at Oxford and at the time of his election the youngest MP, having been only 23 at the time.

In 1955 Boothby had won the seat with a majority of just over 10,000 votes, and prior to his elevation, had served in his seat for 34 years. While that contest had been a straight fight between the Conservatives and Labour, the by-election saw the Liberal Party also field a candidate. Analysis showed that the by-election had a higher voter turnout than the general election, with a 65.34% turnout rate vs. a 59.7% in the general election.

== Controversies ==
One week prior to the election, controversy stirred up around Wolrige-Gordon's candidacy following a rally held by his grandmother, Dame Flora MacLeod, following comments she made about Viscount Bernard Montgomery during a rally of housewives from Fraserburgh, in which she criticized Montgomery for taking an old-age pension from the government in spite of the fact that he was already incredibly wealthy, calling for more pension allocation for poorer residents.

== Result ==
1958 Aberdeenshire East by-election Electorate
Party	Candidate	Votes	%	±%
Unionist	Patrick Wolrige-Gordon	14,314	48.5	−20.0
Labour	John B Urquhart	7,986	27.1	−4.4
Liberal	Maitland Mackie	7,153	24.3	New
Majority		6,328	21.4	−15.7
Turnout		29,485		
Unionist hold		Swing		
