= Chiefs of Clan MacLeod =

The Chiefs of Clan MacLeod claim descent from Leod, a high-born Norse-Gael who is thought to have lived in the 13th century, but whose ancestors are known from multiple pedigrees at least into the early 12th or late 11th centuries. It is said that the chiefs of the clan have been seated at Dunvegan Castle since the time of Leod, and this on the Isle of Skye where for centuries they were sovereign within their own territories.

In 1716, Norman MacLeod (today regarded as the 22nd Chief of Clan MacLeod) was created Lord MacLeod in the Jacobite Peerage.

In the early 20th century, the immediate senior male-line of the chiefs ended with Dame Flora MacLeod of MacLeod, 28th chief, daughter of Sir Reginald MacLeod of MacLeod, 27th chief. Sir Reginald was the first president of the Clan MacLeod Society, and his daughter also became president. Dame Flora selected one of her grandsons, John Wolrige-Gordon, as her successor. John later changed his surname to MacLeod of MacLeod, and on his grandmother's death in 1976 inherited Dunvegan Castle and the MacLeod estate. He was recognised by MacLeod clan societies as the 29th chief of the clan, and granted the chiefly arms by the Lord Lyon King of Arms. His second son, Hugh Magnus MacLeod of MacLeod, is currently recognised by the Associated Clan MacLeod Societies as the clan's 30th chief.

In recent years, an Australian MacLeod has claimed to be the rightful chief because he is acknowledged as having a direct male-line descent from a 17th-century chief, and is the senior agnate of the senior cadet branch. His supporters would contend that, because Guy MacLeod of Talisker is the senior agnate, he is the legitimate, de jure Chief of Clan MacLeod, regardless of any recognition given to the de facto chiefs by the Court of the Lord Lyon or by the modern clan society itself (which is not the same entity as the ancient Clan MacLeod). Guy MacLeod of Talisker has stated that he has no interest in the estates, only wanting acknowledgement of his right to the title. See agnatic seniority.

== List of chiefs ==
Not descended in the male-line from previous clan chiefs

#	Name	Dates	Ancestral notes
1	Leod (Leòd)	c. 1200–1280.	Today his ancestry is considered uncertain (Gael-Norse-Pictish).
2	Norman (Tormod)	aft.1220–bef.1280.	Son of Leod. Nothing certain is known about him. Created the Gaelic patronymic Sìol Thormoid
3	Malcolm (Gillecaluim)	1296–1370.	Son of Norman. Considered the elder brother of Murdoch (Murchadh) whom Clan Macleod of The Lewes are thought to descend from.
4	John (Iain Ciar)	1320–1392.	Son of Malcolm.
5	William 'the Clerk' (Uilleam Cleireach)	1365–1409.	Son of John.
6	John 'the Turbulent' (Iain Borb)	1392–1448.	Son of William.
7	William 'Long Sword' (Uilleam Dubh)	1415–1480.	Son of John 'the Turbulent'.
8	Alexander 'the Humpbacked' (Alasdair Crotach)	1455–1547.	Son of William 'Long Sword'.
9	William	1505–1551.	Son of Alexander.
10	Mary	1543–aft.1602.	Daughter of William.
11	Donald	c. 1507–1557.	Younger son of Alexander (and younger brother of William and in consequence uncle to Mary).
12	Norman (Tormod)	c. 1509–1589.	Younger son of Alexander (and younger brother of Donald, William and in consequence uncle to Mary).
13	William	c. 1560–1590.	Son of Norman.
14	John	1580–1595.	Son of William.
15	Sir Roderick (Rory Mor; Ruairidh Mor)	1573–1626.	Son of Norman (and younger brother of William and in consequence uncle to John).
16	John (Iain Mor)	1595–1649.	Son of Sir Roderick.
17	Roderick 'the Witty' (Ruairidh Mir)	1635–1664.	Son of John.
18	John 'the Speckled' (Iain Breac)	1637–1693.	Son of John.
19	Roderick (Ruairidh Og)	1674–1699.	Son of John 'the Speckled'.
20	Norman	1685–1706.	Son of John 'the Speckled'.
21	John	1704–1706.	Son of Norman.
22	Norman 'the Wicked Man'	1705–1772.	Son of Norman.
23	Norman 'the General'	1754–1801.	Grandson of Norman 'the Wicked Man'.
24	John Norman	1788–1835.	Son of 'the General'.
25	Norman	1812–1895.	Eldest son (second child) of John Norman.
26	Norman Magnus	1839–1929.	Eldest son (second child) of Norman.
27	Sir Reginald, KCB	1847–1935.	Third son (fourth child) of Norman.
28	Dame Flora Louisa Cecilia, DBE	1878–1976.	Eldest daughter of Sir Reginald.
29	John	1935–2007.	Younger son of a daughter of Flora Louisa Cecilia. Named as heir by his grandmother in 1951 after changing his surname to Macleod of Macleod.
30	Hugh Magnus	1973–Present.	Second son of John.

== Wolrige-Gordon family ==
Norman MacLeod of MacLeod, 25th chief, died in 1895, leaving three sons. Norman Magnus MacLeod of MacLeod succeeded his father, becoming the 26th chief. The entail of the estate stipulated that Dunvegan Castle would only pass to a male, and on the failure of the male line to the daughter of the last surviving son. Norman Magnus died in 1929, and was succeeded by his brother, Sir Reginald MacLeod of MacLeod, 27th chief. On the death of Sir Reginald's younger brother, Canon Roderick Charles MacLeod, in 1934, Sir Reginald's eldest daughter, Flora, became heir to the estate. On the death of Sir Reginald, in 1935, Flora inherited Dunvegan Castle and the MacLeod estate. Flora MacLeod of MacLeod was recognised as the clan's chief by the Clan MacLeod Society, which was first formed in the 19th century. She was later granted the arms of MacLeod of MacLeod by the Lord Lyon King of Arms. Dame Flora chose one of her grandsons as her successor, John Wolrige-Gordon, younger son of Capt. Robert Wolrige-Gordon and Joan Walter (daughter of Dame Flora). On being chosen heir, John changed his surname to MacLeod of MacLeod, and on his grandmother's death in 1976, inherited the castle and estate. John MacLeod of MacLeod was also recognised as the clan's chief by the society, and was later granted his grandmother's arms by the Lord Lyon. On his death in 2007, John was succeeded by his second son, Hugh Magnus MacLeod of MacLeod, who was recognised as the clan's 30th chief by the Associated Clan MacLeod Societies, and granted his father's arms by the Lord Lyon.

== Rival claims by MacLeod of Talisker ==
In 2007, following the death of John MacLeod of MacLeod, Guy MacLeod of Talisker, from Australia, claimed to be the rightful chief of Clan MacLeod. Talisker traces his descent, in the direct male-line, from the 17th-century chief Sir Rory Mor MacLeod; a descent acknowledged by leading clan genealogists. Talisker has stated that he is "keen that the bloodline shouldn't be lost". The present chiefs, recognised by the Clan MacLeod Societies, descend from Dame Flora MacLeod of MacLeod (d. 1976), but are descended in the direct male-line from Robert Wolrige-Gordon (d. 1939), husband of Dame Flora's daughter, Joan Walter. Talisker is quoted as asking, "How could John have been the chief of the MacLeods when he wasn't even a MacLeod?" Although the Head of Clan MacLeod of Lewis comes through the male line, there are cases in which Clan Headships follow a female line, such as Clan MacLeod, Clan Keith and Clan Mackenzie.

== See also ==
- Derbfhine
- Tanistry
