= Charles Lindsay Temple =

Charles Lindsay Temple (20 November 1871 – 9 January 1929) was Lieutenant-Governor of Northern Nigeria from January 1914 until ill health caused him to relinquish the post in 1917.

Temple was the only child from the second marriage of Sir Richard Temple, 1st Baronet, who had wed Mary Augusta Lindsay in January 1871. He was born in Shimla, British India, on 20 November 1871. He was educated at Sedbergh School and then admitted to Trinity College, Cambridge in June 1890, but left after a short time owing to ill health.

From 1898 he was acting consul at the state of Pará, Brazil, and from 1899 to 1901 the vice-consul at Manaus in the same country. After being transferred to Northern Nigeria in 1901, he was appointed CMG for his diplomatic service in 1909 and rose to become Lieutenant-Governor of that region in 1914.

He married Olive MacLeod, daughter of Sir Reginald MacLeod of MacLeod, in 1912. He died in Granada, Spain, of kidney failure on 9 January 1929.

In 1915, Olive and Charles published a book on their life in Nigeria titled Notes on the Tribes, Provinces, Emirates and States of the Northern Provinces of Nigeria.
