= Norman McLeod =

Norman McLeod may refer to:

- Norman McLeod (minister) (1780–1866), Presbyterian minister from Scotland who led a settlement of Highlanders to Nova Scotia and New Zealand
- Norman McLeod (Australian politician) (1816–1886), pastoralist and member of the Victorian Legislative Assembly
- Norman Leslie McLeod (1892–1949), politician in Saskatchewan, Canada
- Norman Z. McLeod (1898–1964), American film director, cartoonist and writer
- Norm McLeod (soccer) (born 1938), former Canadian national soccer team player
- Norm McLeod (Australian footballer) (1879–1913), Australian rules footballer
- Norman McLeod (rugby union) (1856–1921), English rugby union international
- Norman MacLeod (poet) (1906–1985), American poet and writer

== See also ==
- Norman Macleod (disambiguation)
