= Norman MacLeod of MacLeod =

Chief of the Scottish Clan MacLeod

- Born: 18 July 1812; Dunvegan, Skye, Scotland
- Died: 5 February 1895 (aged 82); Paris, France
- Title: The 25th Chief of Clan MacLeod
- Predecessor: John Norman MacLeod (father)
- Successor: Norman Magnus MacLeod of MacLeod (son)
- Spouses: Louisa Barbara St. John (m. 1837) Hanna von Ettingshausen (m. 1881)
- Children: 5

Norman MacLeod of MacLeod (18 July 1812 – 5 February 1895) was the 25th Chief of Clan MacLeod.

== Biography ==
Norman MacLeod of MacLeod was born on 18 July 1812 at Dunvegan, Skye. He was the son of John Norman MacLeod of MacLeod (1788–1835), 24th Chief of Clan MacLeod and his wife Anne Stephenson (1785−1861). He was educated at Harrow and then went abroad to Paris and Vienna. In 1835, Norman's father died and he subsequently succeeded to the chiefship of Clan MacLeod.

Norman attempted many costly improvements at Dunvegan Castle, as well as unsuccessful ventures in farming, and greatly encumbered the clan's estates and thus ruined himself financially.

During the enthusiasm for the Volunteer movement following an invasion scare in 1859, a group from the South Kensington Museum, headed by Norman, approached the War Office with an offer to raise two companies from the engineering and allied professions. The proposal was accepted in January 1860 and enlistment of the 1st Middlesex Engineers began on 6 February, creating the first Engineer Volunteer Corps. Norman was appointed Captain in command, Major a year later, and then Lieutenant-Colonel as the unit rapidly grew beyond its initial two companies. Norman relinquished command in 1871 and was appointed Honorary Colonel of the corps.

== Family life ==
In 1837, Norman married the Hon. Louisa Barbara St. John (1818–1880), only daughter of the 14th Baron St John of Bletso. In this first marriage, Norman had a daughter and four sons. His daughter, Louisa Cecilia MacLeod, later married John Moyer Heathcote, an English barrister and real tennis player. In 1881, he married, secondly, Hanna, daughter of Baron von Ettingshausen (Austria). Norman had no children in his second marriage.

Norman died in Paris, France, on 5 February 1895, and was buried at Duirinish Church at Dunvegan.

== Succession of the chiefship after his death ==
Norman's eldest son, Norman Magnus MacLeod of MacLeod (1839–1929), succeeded him as 26th Chief of Clan MacLeod. The 26th Chief later died without male issue. Norman's second eldest son, Torquil Olave (1841–1857) had earlier died without issue, as well. The 26th Chief of Clan MacLeod was, therefore, succeeded by Norman's third son, Sir Reginald MacLeod of MacLeod (1847–1935), as the 27th Chief of Clan MacLeod. Sir Reginald also had no sons, but two daughters. After Sir Reginald's death, he was succeeded by his eldest daughter Dame Flora MacLeod of MacLeod (1878–1976), 28th Chief of Clan MacLeod and second female chief of the clan.

Arms of the chief of Clan MacLeod, the MacLeod of MacLeod.

== Coat of arms ==
His coat of arms is described thus:

Shield
I and IV azure a castle triple towered and embattled argent masoned sable windowed and porched gules and II and III gules three legs in armour proper garnished and spurred Or flexed and conjoined in triangle at the upper part of the thigh.
Crest and mantle
Upon a torse Or and azure, A bull's head cabossed sable horned Or between two flags gules staves sable, the mantling azure double Or.
Supporters
Two lions reguardant gules armed and langued azure each holding a dagger proper.

== Ancestry ==
Ancestors of Norman MacLeod of MacLeod

16. Norman MacLeod, 22nd of MacLeod
8. John MacLeod of MacLeod, younger
17. Janet Macdonald
4. Lt-Gen. Norman MacLeod, 23rd of MacLeod
18. Alexander Brodie, 19th of Brodie, MP
9. Amelia Brodie
19. Mary Sleigh
2. John Norman MacLeod, 24th of MacLeod, MP
20. John Stackhouse
10. Nathaniel Stackhouse, MC
21. Anne Hornet
5. Sarah Stackhouse
22.
11. Sarah Simpson
23.
1. Norman MacLeod, 25th of MacLeod
24.
12.
25.
6. John Stephenson
26.
13.
27.
3. Anne Stephenson
28.
14. Capt. James Broadley, RN
29.
7. Mary Broadley
30.
15.
31.
