= John Norman MacLeod =

British politician

Member of Parliament for Sudbury
- In office 1828–1830
- Preceded by: John Wilks
- Succeeded by: Sir John Walsh

The 24th Chief of Clan MacLeod
- Preceded by: Norman 'the General' (father)
- Succeeded by: Norman MacLeod of MacLeod (son)

Personal details
- Born: 3 August 1788
- Died: 25 March 1835 (aged 46)
- Spouse: Anne Stephenson
- Children: 9
- Parent: Norman 'the General' (father)

John Norman MacLeod (3 August 1788 – 25 March 1835) was a British politician who sat in the House of Commons from 1828 to 1830. He was the 24th Chief of Clan MacLeod.

John was born in India, the son of Major-General Norman MacLeod of MacLeod, 23rd Chief of Clan MacLeod. He married Anne Stephenson, sister of banker Rowland Stephenson. They had nine children.

In 1828, John was elected at a by-election as a member of parliament (MP) for Sudbury and held the seat until 1830.

He died in 1835 and was buried at Old Kilmuir Cem, Dunvegan, Skye, Scotland. His son, Norman MacLeod of MacLeod, succeeded him as the 25th Chief of Clan MacLeod.

== Ancestry ==
Ancestors of John Norman MacLeod

16. Norman MacLeod, 20th of MacLeod
8. Norman MacLeod, 22nd of MacLeod
17. The Hon. Anne Fraser
4. John MacLeod of MacLeod, younger
18. Sir Donald Macdonald, 11th of Sleat, 4th Bt.
9. Janet Macdonald
19. Mary Macdonald
2. Lt-Gen. Norman MacLeod, 23rd of MacLeod
20. George Brodie, 17th of Brodie
10. Alexander Brodie, 19th of Brodie, MP
21. Emilia Brodie
5. Amelia Brodie
22. Maj.Samuel Sleigh
11. Mary Sleigh
23. Isabel Corbet
1. John Norman MacLeod, 24th of MacLeod, MP
24. Isaac Stackhouse
12. John Stackhouse
25.
6. Nathaniel Stackhouse, MC
26.
13. Anne Hornet
27.
3. Sarah Stackhouse
28.
14.
29.
7. Sarah Simpson
30.
15.
31.

Parliament of the United Kingdom
Preceded by Bethel Walrond; John Wilks	Member of Parliament for Sudbury; 1828–1830; With: Bethel Walrond	Succeeded by Bethel Walrond; Sir John Benn Walsh
