= John Wilks (swindler) =

English lawyer, politician, writer and swindler

John Wilks (c. 1793–1846) was an English lawyer, politician, writer and swindler.

== Life ==
He was a son of John Wilks, by his wife Isabella (d. 19 Jan. 1846), and followed his father's profession as an attorney. In 1825 he earned the name of "Bubble Wilks" by floating a number of joint-stock companies, all of which were financial failures. On 13 June 1826 he was returned to Parliament for the borough of Sudbury in Suffolk in the Whig interest. In April 1828 he resigned his seat, and shortly afterwards he was charged before the Lord Mayor with forgery, but was acquitted on the non-appearance of the prosecutor.

On his release, Wilks obtained the post of Paris correspondent to The Standard, signing his contributions to London papers "O. P. Q." Trying to repair his fortunes on the Paris Bourse, he spread false reports, and was ordered by the head of the police to leave France within four days. Friends, however, had the order revoked. He next formed a joint-stock company to establish a newspaper, The London and Paris Courier. After it had appeared for a few months, Wilks fled, leaving debts to be paid by an English partner. Shortly after he exploited a second company, to finance a monthly magazine called La Revue Protestante.

After forming an unsuccessful Paris Parcels Delivery Company, Wilks returned to London, and, settling in Surrey Street, Strand, attempted to found an Authors' Institute. His last project was the establishment of a fraudulent clerical registry office.

Before his dishonesty was detected, Wilks died suddenly at Chelsea, on 17 January 1846, leaving no assets.

== Works ==
Wilks was the author of:

- A Christian Biographical Dictionary, London, 1821.
- Memoirs of Queen Caroline, London, 1822, 2 vols.
- Bianca: a Fragment, London, 1823.

After his return to England, Wilks was a contributor to Fraser's Magazine, supplying reminiscences of Louis-Philippe and other notable Frenchmen.

== Notes ==
Attribution

This article incorporates text from a publication now in the public domain: Lee, Sidney, ed. (1900). "Wilks, John". Dictionary of National Biography. Vol. 61. London: Smith, Elder & Co.
