= Patrick Wolrige-Gordon =

Scottish politician

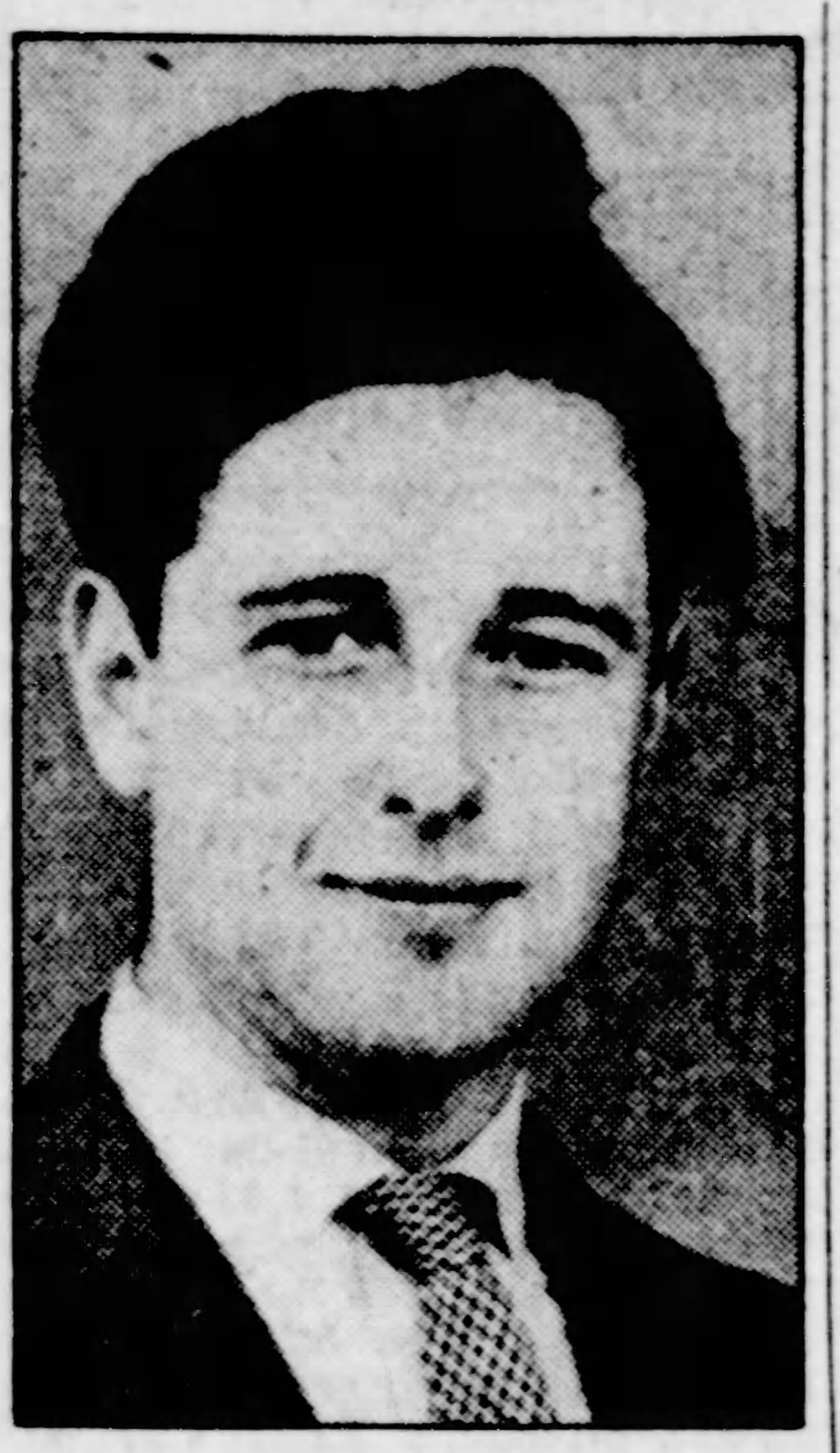
- Wolridge-Gordon in 1958

Member of Parliament for East Aberdeenshire
- In office 20 November 1958 – 8 February 1974
- Preceded by: Robert Boothby
- Succeeded by: Douglas Henderson

Personal details
- Born: 10 August 1935 Ellon, Aberdeenshire
- Died: 22 May 2002 (aged 66) Newburgh, Aberdeenshire
- Spouse: Anne Marie Howard (m. 1962)
- Children: 3
- Parent(s): Captain Robert Wolrige-Gordon, Joan Walter
- Occupation: Politician

Patrick Wolrige-Gordon (10 August 1935 – 22 May 2002), was a Scottish Conservative and Unionist Party politician.

== Biography ==
Patrick Wolrige-Gordon was one of twin sons of Captain Robert Wolrige-Gordon, MC and his wife Joan Walter, the daughter of Dame Flora MacLeod, the 28th Chief of the Clan MacLeod. He was educated at Cheam School, followed by Eton College and went on to New College, Oxford. He served as a lieutenant in the Argyll and Sutherland Highlanders. His great-uncle was Brigadier General Robert Gordon Gilmour.

== Career ==
Patrick Wolrige-Gordon was elected Conservative and Unionist Member of Parliament (MP) for East Aberdeenshire in November 1958 at a by-election when he was still an undergraduate. At 23, he was at the time the youngest MP.

He married Anne Marie Howard, daughter of journalist Peter Howard and tennis player Doris Metaxa in 1962. He became involved through Howard in Frank Buchman's Moral Re-Armament (MRA) movement, which attracted much negative comment. He fell out with his local association over the matter and was defeated in the February 1974 general election by the Scottish National Party candidate Douglas Henderson.

== Global policy ==
He was one of the signatories of the agreement to convene a convention for drafting a world constitution. As a result, for the first time in human history, a World Constituent Assembly convened to draft and adopt the Constitution for the Federation of Earth.

== Honours ==
He was appointed a Liveryman of the Worshipful Company of Wheelwrights in 1966.

== Family ==
Patrick Wolrige-Gordon had a son and two daughters. His elder twin brother, John Wolrige-Gordon (1935–2007), changed his name to John MacLeod of MacLeod to take up the role of 29th Clan Chieftain, which he inherited from their grandmother.

Parliament of the United Kingdom
Preceded by Robert Boothby	Member of Parliament for East Aberdeenshire; 1958 – February 1974	Succeeded by Douglas Henderson
Honorary titles
Preceded by Basil de Ferranti	Baby of the House; 1958–1959	Succeeded by Paul Channon
