= Governor of Northern Nigeria =

Office of the Governing body of the northern-region of Nigeria

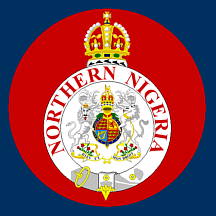
- Gubernatorial seal

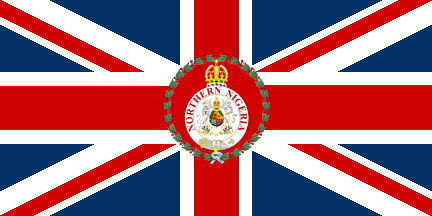
- Gubernatorial flag
- Regional Government of Northern Nigeria
- Style: His Excellency
- Residence: Arewa House
- Seat: Kaduna
- Appointer: The Crown, later Government of Nigeria
- Term length: No fixed term
- Constituting instrument: Constitution and Laws of Northern Nigeria
- Formation: 1 January 1897
- First holder: Frederick John Dealtry Lugard; 1 January 1897

The High Commissioner or Governor of Northern Nigeria, originally the High Commissioner of the Northern Nigeria Protectorate, after 1914 the Lieutenant Governor, Chief Commissioner, or Governor General of the Northern Provinces of Nigeria, was effectively the viceroy of Northern Nigeria, exercising British suzerainty as representative of the Crown. The office of High Commissioner was first established on 1 January 1897, by letters patent from Queen Victoria, and after the departure of the British in 1960 it was continued until 1967 as representative of the new administration in Lagos.

With effect from 27 May 1967, Northern Nigeria was divided into the North-Eastern State, North-Western State, Kano State, Kaduna State, Kwara State, and the Benue-Plateau State, each with its own Governor.

== Governors ==
| No. | Image | Governor | Took office | Left office | Title |
|---|---|---|---|---|---|
| 1 | | Sir Frederick John Dealtry Lugard | 1900 | 1906 | High Commissioner of Northern Nigeria |
| 2 | | Sir Percy Girouard | 1907 | 1909 | High Commissioner of Northern Nigeria |
| 3 | | Sir Henry Hesketh Bell | 1909 | 1911 | High Commissioner of Northern Nigeria |
| 4 | | Charles Lindsay Temple | 1911 | 1912 | High Commissioner of Northern Nigeria |
| 5 | | Sir Frederick John Dealtry Lugard | 1912 | 1914 | Lieutenant Governor of Northern Nigeria |
| 6 | | Charles Lindsay Temple | 1914 | 1917 | Lieutenant Governor |
| 7 | | Herbert Symonds Goldsmith | 1917 | 1921 | Lieutenant Governor |
| 8 | | Sir William Frederick Gowers | 1921 | 1925 | Lieutenant Governor |
| 9 | | Sir Herbert Richmond Palmer | 1925 | 1930 | Lieutenant Governor |
| 10 | | Cyril Wilson Alexander | 1930 | 1932 | Chief Commissioner |
| 11 | | George Sinclair Browne | 1932 | 1936 | Chief Commissioner |
| 12 | | Sir Theodore Samuel Adams | 1936 | 1943 | Chief Commissioner |
| 13 | | Sir John Robert Patterson | 1943 | 1947 | Chief Commissioner |
| 14 | | Eric Westbury Thompstone | 1947 | 1951 | Chief Commissioner |
| 15 | | Sir Eric Westbury Thompstone | 1951 | 1952 | Lieutenant Governor |
| 16 | | Sir Eric Westbury Thompstone | 1952 | 1953 | Governor General of Northern Nigeria |
| 17 | | Sir Bryan Sharwood-Smith | 1 October 1954 | 2 December 1957 | Governor General of Northern Nigeria |
| 18 | | Sir Muhammadu Sanusi I | 1957 | Acted for six months | Acting Governor General of Northern Nigeria for six months during the administration of Sir Gawain Westray Bell |
| 19 | | Sir Gawain Westray Bell | 2 December 1957 | 1962 | Governor General of Northern Nigeria |
| 20 | | Alhaji Sir Kashim Ibrahim | 1962 | 16 January 1966 | Governor |
| 21 | | Hassan Usman Katsina | 16 January 1966 | 27 May 1967 | Governor (military) |

== See also ==
- States of Nigeria
