= Norman MacLeod (The Wicked Man) =

Scottish clan chief

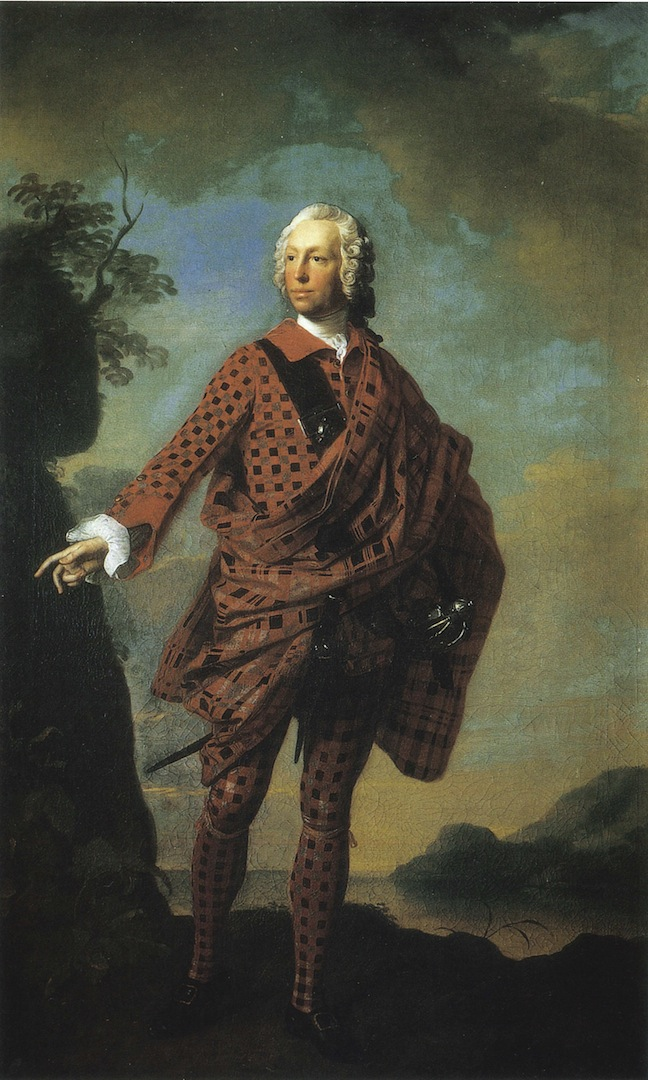
- Portrait of Norman MacLeod, c. 1747, by Allan Ramsay

Member of Parliament for Inverness-shire
- In office 1741–1754
- Preceded by: Sir James Grant, Bt.
- Succeeded by: Pryse Campbell

The 22nd Chief of Clan MacLeod
- Preceded by: John MacLeod (brother)
- Succeeded by: Norman 'the General' (grandson)

Personal details
- Born: 29 July 1705
- Died: 21 July 1772 (aged 66) St Andrews
- Resting place: St Andrew's Cathedral
- Spouses: Janet Macdonald (m. 1724; death 1743) Anne Martin (m. 1748)
- Children: 8
- Parent(s): Norman MacLeod (father); Anne Fraser (mother)

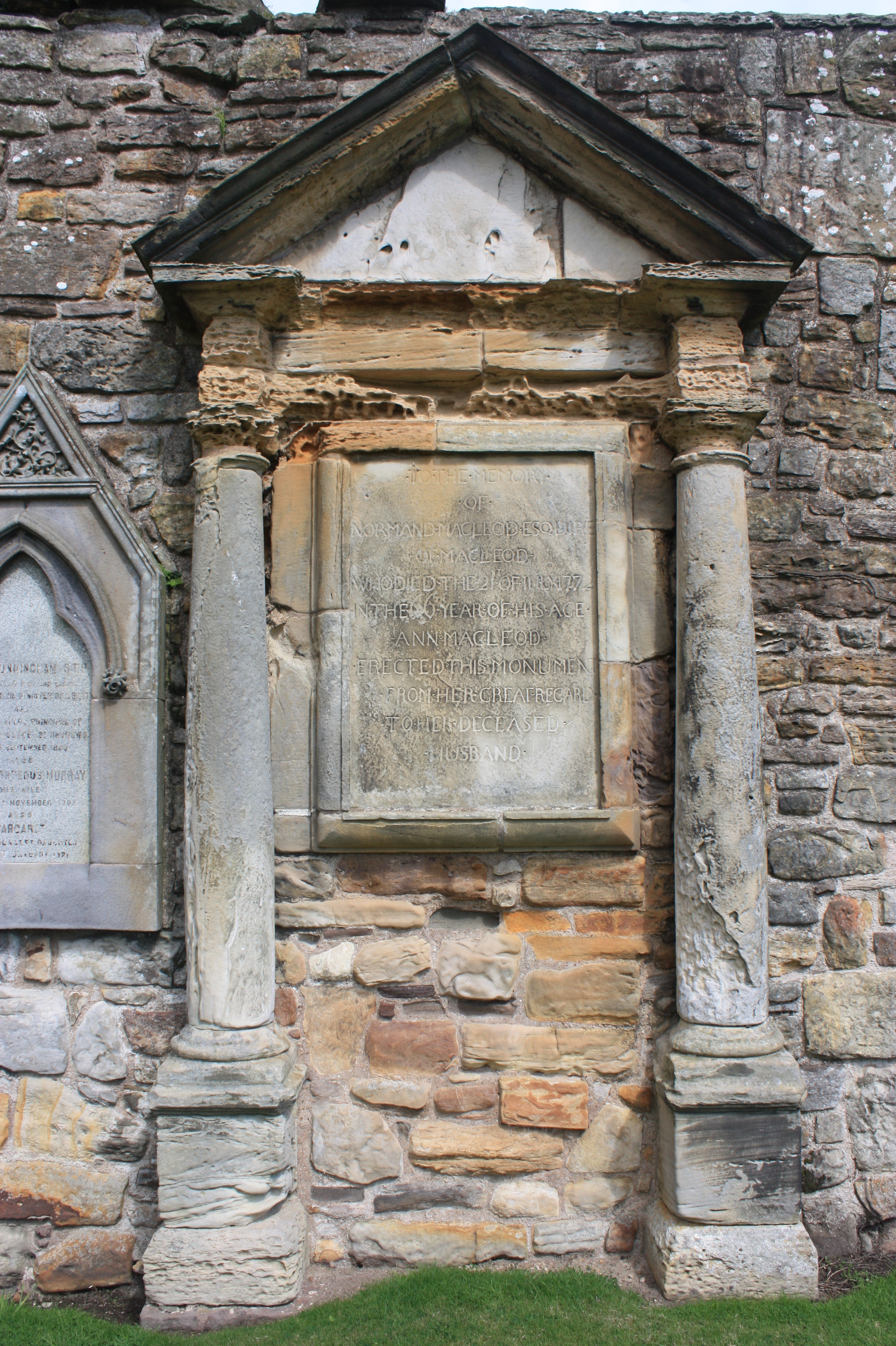
The monument to Norman MacLeod, St Andrews Cathedral churchyard

Norman MacLeod of MacLeod (Scottish Gaelic: Tormod MacLeòid) (1705–1772), also known as The Wicked Man (Scottish Gaelic: An Droch Dhuine), was an 18th-century Scottish politician and the 22nd Chief of Clan MacLeod.

== Background ==
Norman was the younger son of Norman MacLeod, the 20th Chief of Clan MacLeod. Norman's brother, John, was briefly the 21st Chief of Clan MacLeod as an infant after their father died in 1706. By 1707, John had also died, and Norman was left with the chiefdom at the age of 1.

Norman was the Member of Parliament for Inverness-shire between 1741 and 1754. He matriculated arms, and supporters, at Lyon Office, on 12 January 1753. He supported the Government cause in the Jacobite Rising, and was an absentee chief as he seldom lived at his ancestors' traditional seat of Dunvegan Castle.

== The Ship of the People ==
Norman MacLeod was a leading figure in a 1739 scandal centred around the so-called 'Ship of the People' (Scottish Gaelic: Soitheach nan Daoine), when he and Sir Alexander MacDonald of Sleat kidnapped approximately 100 of their tenants on the Isle of Skye and on the Isle of Harris, and planned to sell them into indentured servitude in the American Colonies on the pretense of transporting petty criminals, which was legal and normal for chiefs at the time. The human cargo, which included men, women, and children as young as 5, were loaded onto the William, which then disembarked in Donaghadee in present day Northern Ireland for supplies. While in Ireland, several victims attempted to escape, attracting the attention of local magistrates, who reported the case to the British government. Norman and Sir Alexander successfully denied their complicity in the incident, and were not prosecuted by government authorities, who instead implicated several conspirators personally involved in transporting the victims.

== Jacobite Rising ==
Norman, and his group within the clan (other parts of the clan were loyal to the Jacobites, notably from Raasay), supported the Government during the 1745 Jacobite Rising. Norman had initially pledged his support for the cause, but as soon as Charles Edward Stuart reached Scotland, he is known to have been working against the Jacobite cause. Historian James Hunter speculated that his relationship to Lord President Duncan Forbes of Culloden, who cleared him of charges after the Ship of the People incident, played a key role in his decision to support the Hanoverians. He raised several independent companies for the British government in 1745. In December, Norman was ordered to march his troops and engage Lord Lewis Gordon. Norman left Inverness on 10 December, with about 700 men. On the night of 23 December, he was defeated by a superior force commanded by Gordon at the Battle of Inverurie. About 70 of Norman's men were killed, wounded, or captured.

Norman, and his men, did not take part in the Battle of Culloden. Other Macleods were however Jacobites, fighting at Culloden, smuggling the Prince to safety (see Malcolm and Murdoch MacLeod) as were many MacDonalds (see Flora MacDonald disguising the Prince in women's clothes). On 22 April, following the battle, William, Duke of Cumberland ordered John Campbell, 4th Earl of Loudoun, to march all his men into the Highlands and devastate the lands of the men who supported the rebellion. Loudon then crossed into the mainland with about 500 of his men but was followed by the loyalist Macdonalds and Norman, who together had about 1,200 men between them. Several days later the combined force laid waste to the lands of Grant of Glenmoriston. Norman's men also raided the nearby island of Raasay, in the aftermath of the Jacobite failure. The island was the home of the MacLeods of Raasay who had supported the Jacobite cause, and who had been present at Culloden. Norman's men destroyed 32 boats, 300 houses, and killed 1,000 cows, sheep, and horses.

== Nickname ==
Norman was known in his own time by the nickname "The Wicked Man" (Scottish Gaelic: An Droch Dhuine). This may be partly because, during his minority, he went through £60,000 and left his estate a debt of £50,000. In consequence of this debt, the ancestral clan lands of Harris and Glenelg were lost. The Ship of the People incident, an attempt to remedy this debt, was also a major reason for his nickname. Another reason for the name is from his part in the Lady Grange affair and the ill treatment to his first wife. In the 20th century, Dame Flora MacLeod of MacLeod, 28th Chief of Clan MacLeod, tried to have his unflattering nickname changed to "The Red Man", because of the colour of the tartan he wears in the portrait painted by Allan Ramsay (pictured).

== Family ==
Norman's first marriage was to Janet, daughter of Sir Donald Macdonald of Sleat, 4th Baronet, in December 1724. Norman had his wife live with her mother-in-law and several sisters-in-law at Castle Leod. By 1733, the couple were separated, and remained apart from one another for seven years. In 1740, Duncan Forbes of Culloden was able to negotiate a reconciliation between the pair, and she then lived with Norman until her death in 1743. According to tradition, Norman brought about Janet's death by locking her in the dungeon of Dunvegan Castle and leaving her to starve there. Through this marriage, the couple had one son and two daughters: John MacLeod of MacLeod Younger, Emilia, and Anne.

Five years after Janet's death, Norman married Anne, daughter of William Martin of Inchfure. Anne died in 1802. The couple had three daughters: Elizabeth, Anne, and Mary.

Norman also had two illegitimate sons, Alexander and Norman.

== Death ==
Norman died on 21 July 1772 and was buried in the kirkyard of St Andrews Cathedral, in St Andrews. He was succeeded by his grandson, Norman MacLeod.

== Ancestry ==
Ancestors of Norman MacLeod (The Wicked Man)

16. Sir Roderick MacLeod, 15th of MacLeod
8. Ian Mor MacLeod, 16th of MacLeod
17. Isabella Macdonald
4. Ian Breac MacLeod, 18th of MacLeod
18. Kenneth Mackenzie, 1st Lord Mackenzie of Kintail
9. Sybella Mackenzie
19. Jean Anne Ross
2. Norman MacLeod, 20th of MacLeod
20. Sir Donald Macdonald, 8th of Sleat, 1st Bt.
10. Sir James Mor Macdonald, 9th of Sleat, 2nd Bt.
21. Janet Mackenzie
5. Florence Macdonald
22. Sir Roderick Mackenzie, of Castle Leod
11. Margaret Mackenzie
23. Margaret MacLeod
1. Norman MacLeod, 22nd of MacLeod
24. Hugh Fraser, Master of Lovat
12. Hugh Fraser, 8th Lord (Fraser of) Lovat
25. Lady Anne Leslie
6. Hugh Fraser, 9th Lord (Fraser of) Lovat
26. Sir John Mackenzie of Tarbat, 1st Bt.
13. Anne Mackenzie
27. Margaret Erskine
3. The Hon. Anne Fraser
28. John Murray, 1st Earl of Atholl
14. John Murray, 1st Marquess of Atholl
29. Jean Campbell
7. Lady Amelia Murray
30. James Stanley, 7th Earl of Derby
15. Lady Amelia Anne Sophia Stanley
31. Charlotte de la Trémoille
