= Norman MacLeod (British Army officer) =

British Army officer and politician

Lieutenant-General Norman Macleod FRS FRSE

Member of Parliament for Inverness-shire
- In office 1790–1796
- Preceded by: Lord William Gordon
- Succeeded by: John Simon Frederick Fraser

The 23rd Chief of Clan MacLeod
- Preceded by: Norman MacLeod (The Wicked Man) (grandfather)
- Succeeded by: John Norman MacLeod (son)

Personal details
- Born: 4 March 1754
- Died: 16 April 1801 (aged 47)

Lieutenant-General Norman MacLeod of MacLeod (4 March 1754 – 16 April 1801) was a British Army officer and politician, who served as MP for Inverness-shire 1790 to 1796, a seat previously held by his grandfather, Norman MacLeod. Thomas Pennant called him “unusually intelligent”. As an MP, he was one of the early campaigners (1796) to abolish the slave trade. He was the 23rd Chief of Clan MacLeod.

== Life ==
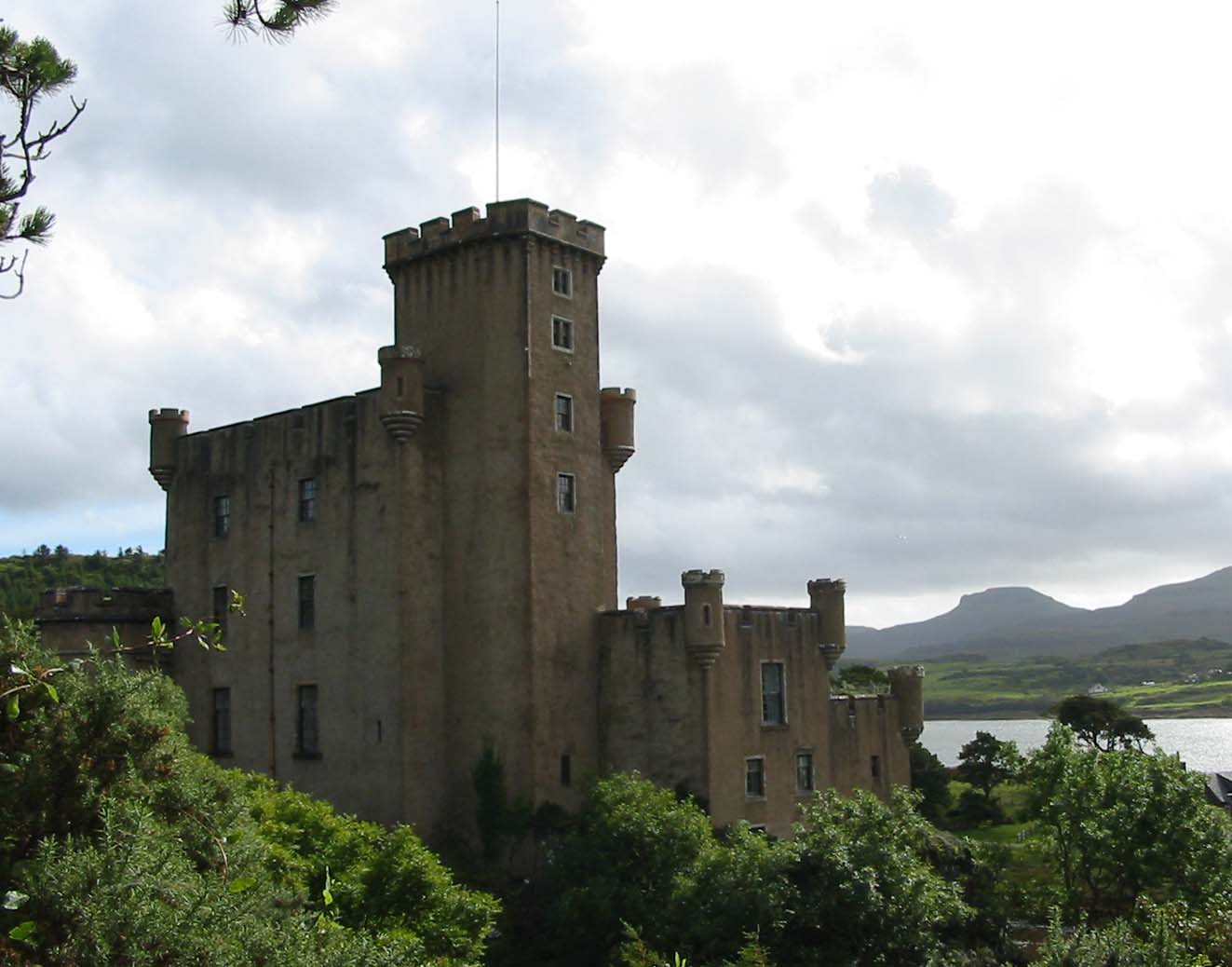
Dunvegan Castle

Norman was born in Brodie House, Moray, on 4 March 1754. He spent his first 10 years with his mother in Hampshire being tutored privately. He was then sent to live with his grandfather in St Andrews before studying at University of St. Andrews (1769/70) but removed due to a “sexual escapade” and then went on to Oxford in 1770.

In 1771 following a cattle plague in his family home of Dunvegan Castle estate on Skye he vowed to return and resolve various difficulties.

In 1772, he succeeded his grandfather as the 23rd Chief of Clan MacLeod. He returned to Dunvegan Castle, the family's ancient seat in Skye and found his grandfather had also left him with a debt of £50,000. By 1775, tired of life on Skye and being unable to free himself of the debt, he obtained a commission as a captain with the 71st or Fraser's Highlanders.

In 1776, he set sail with the regiment for America but was captured by privateers. He returned home a few years later and was promoted to major with the 73rd or MacLeod's Highlanders. Then shortly after, made lieutenant-colonel with the 42nd Highlanders. In 1781, he sailed with the battalion for the Cape of Good Hope but the expedition passed on to India.

He served as a Brevet Colonel in the East Indies between 1782 and 1794, fought against Tipu Sultan, and then in the Malabar region in India where he was second in command. He was in charge of Residency Guards at Lucknow in 1784. He reached the rank of Major General in 1794 on a salary of £6,000 per year.

In 1790, while returning to Britain, he was elected a Fellow of the Royal Society of Edinburgh. His proposers were John Hill (his uncle), Andrew Duncan, and James Hutton. He was elected a Fellow of the Royal Society of London the following year.

As an MP, he voted against war with France in February 1792. In April 1793, he voted for the relief of Scottish Catholics. In 1794, he was accused of embezzling money whilst in India and never recovered from this accusation.

Financially ruined, he abandoned political life and turned to drink by 1796.

He died on Guernsey on 16 April 1801 whilst preparing for a cruise to restore his health. He left debts of £33,000.

He is buried at Saint Cuthbert's Churchyard in Edinburgh.

== Family ==
In April 1776, he married Mary MacKenzie, daughter of William MacKenzie of Suddie. She died in February 1784, an event which mentally scarred Norman for the rest of his life. By Mary, he had a daughter, Mary Emilia, and a son, Norman (1781–1800) who was killed when HMS Queen Charlotte exploded in Leghorn.

Later, he married Sarah Stackhouse, daughter of Nathaniel Stackhouse, a member of council at Bombay, British India. She was a noted beauty. They had one son, John Norman, and three daughters.
