= Flora MacLeod of MacLeod =

Scottish clan chief

Dame Flora MacLeod of MacLeod DBE
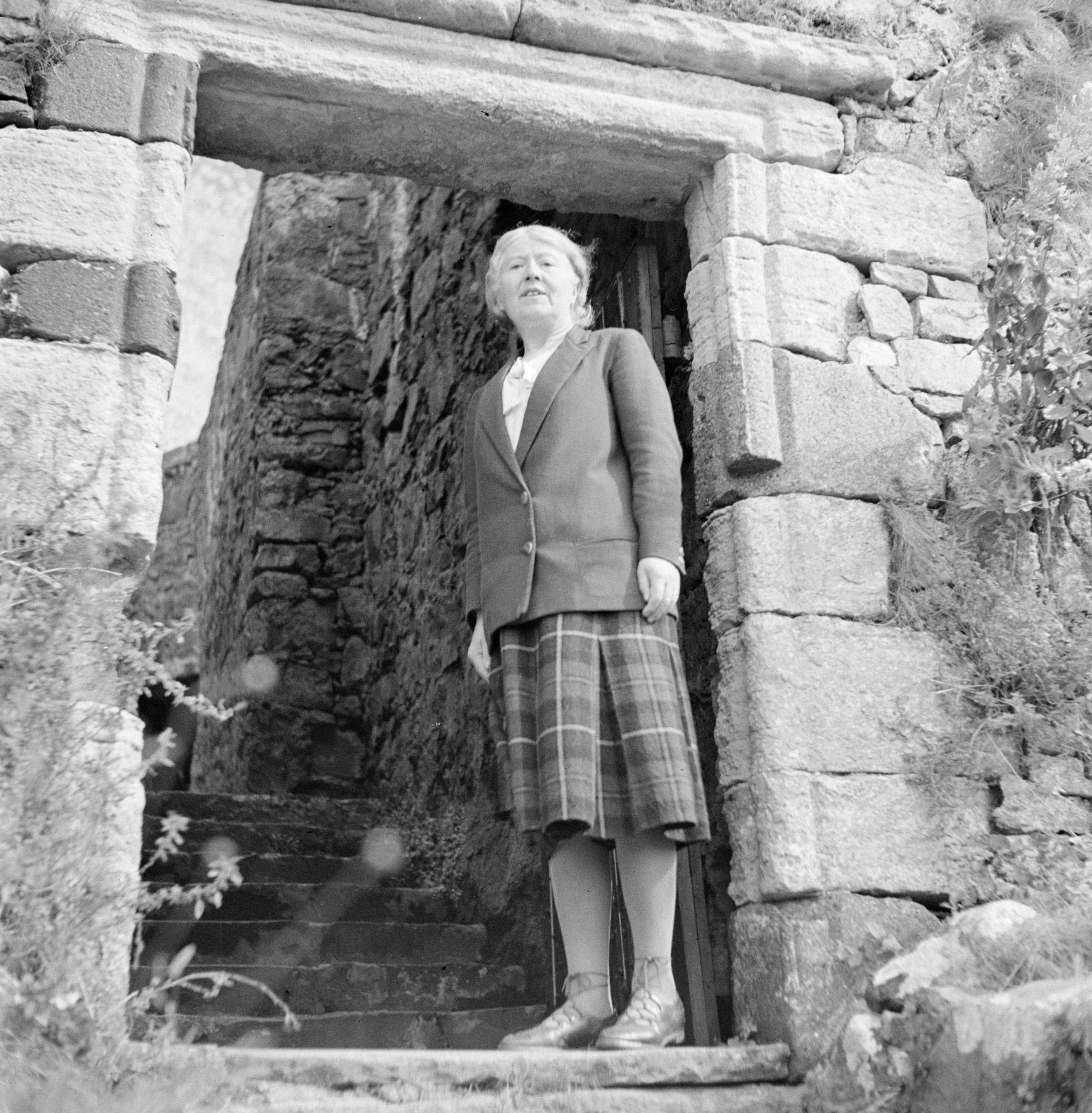
- MacLeod (1934)
- Born: Flora Louisa Cecilia MacLeod; 3 February 1878; 10 Downing Street, London, England
- Died: 4 November 1976 (aged 98); Aberdeenshire, Scotland
- Resting place: Clan MacLeod burial ground, Kilmuir, Dunvegan, Isle of Skye, Scotland
- Known for: The Dame Flora MacLeod of MacLeod Trophy for Open Piobaireachd
- Title: The 28th Chief of Clan MacLeod
- Predecessor: Reginald MacLeod of MacLeod (father)
- Successor: John MacLeod of MacLeod (grandson)
- Spouse: Hubert Walter (m. 1901–1933)
- Children: Joan; Alice
- Parent: Sir Reginald MacLeod (father)
- Relatives: Stafford Northcote (grandfather)
- Awards: DBE

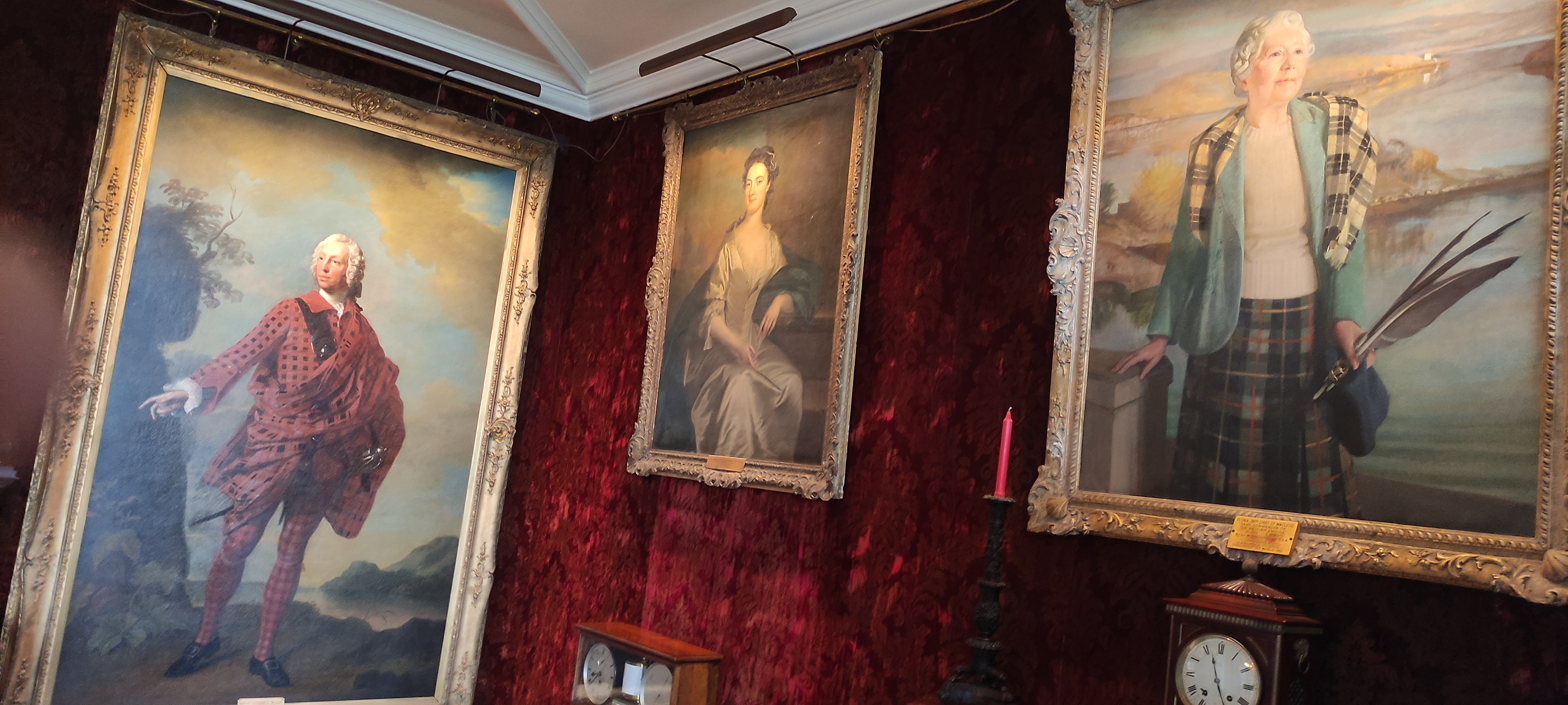
Painting of Flora 28th Chief of MacLeod in Dunvegan Castle

Dame Flora MacLeod of MacLeod, DBE (3 February 1878 – 4 November 1976) was the 28th Chief of Clan MacLeod.

== Biography ==
Flora Louisa Cecilia MacLeod was born at 10 Downing Street, London, in 1878, the home of her grandfather Sir Stafford Northcote, who was then Chancellor of the Exchequer. Her mother was Lady Agnes Mary Cecilia Northcote and her father, Sir Reginald MacLeod, became Chief of Clan MacLeod in 1929. She was elected President of the clan's society and went to live with her father at the 800-year-old family seat, Dunvegan Castle in Skye, where she became a county councillor for Bracadale. In 1901, she married Hubert Walter, a journalist at The Times, with whom she had two daughters, Joan and Alice. Her husband, Hubert Walter, died in 1933.

Upon the death of her father in 1935, Flora MacLeod of MacLeod (as she would be thenceforth known) inherited the estate and was recognised as the 28th Chief of Clan MacLeod. Years later, to raise income, she opened Dunvegan Castle to tourists, turning it into a popular tourist attraction. Following the Second World War, she travelled widely, establishing Clan MacLeod Societies throughout the British Commonwealth.

She was created a DBE in 1953. She lived at Dunvegan Castle until 1973 before moving to Ythan Lodge in Aberdeenshire, where she died in 1976, aged 98. She is buried in the traditional Clan MacLeod burial ground at Kilmuir, near Dunvegan. Her grandson John MacLeod of MacLeod succeeded her.

The Dame Flora MacLeod of MacLeod Trophy for Open Piobaireachd has been presented, since 1969, to the best bagpiper at the Grandfather Mountain Highland Games in North Carolina, USA.

== Ancestry ==
Ancestors of Flora MacLeod of MacLeod

16. Lt-Gen. Norman MacLeod, 23rd of MacLeod
8. John Norman MacLeod, 24th of MacLeod, MP
17. Sarah Stackhouse
4. Norman MacLeod, 25th of MacLeod
18. John Stephenson
9. Anne Stephenson
19. Mary Broadley
2. Sir Reginald MacLeod, 27th of MacLeod, KCB
20. John St. John, 12th Baron St. John of Bletso
10. St. Andrew St. John, 14th Baron St. John of Bletso, MP
21. Susanne Louise Simond
5. The Hon. Louisa Barbara St. John
22. Sir Charles William Rouse Boughton, 1st and 9th Bt.
11. Louisa Rouse Boughton
23. Catherine Pearce
1. Dame Flora Louisa Cecilia MacLeod, 28th of MacLeod, DBE
24. Sir Stafford Henry Northcote, 7th Bt.
12. Henry Stafford Northcote
25. Jacquetta Baring
6. Stafford Henry Northcote, 1st Earl of Iddesleigh
26. Thomas Cockburn
13. Agnes Mary Cockburn
27. Henrietta Colebrooke
3. Lady Agnes Mary Cecilia Northcote
28. James Farrer
14. Thomas Farrer
29. Frances Loxham
7. Cecilia Frances Farrer, CI
30. Richard Willis, of Halsnead Hall
15. Cecilia Willis
31. Cicely Feilden

== Coat of arms ==
Her coat of arms

Her coat of arms are described thus:

Shield
I and IV azure a castle triple towered and embattled argent masoned sable windowed and porched gules and II and III gules three legs in armour proper garnished and spurred Or flexed and conjoined in triangle at the upper part of the thigh.
Crest and mantle
Upon a torse Or and azure, A bull's head cabossed sable horned Or between two flags gules staves sable, the mantling azure double Or.
Supporters
Two lions reguardant gules armed and langued azure each holding a dagger proper
