= List of Scottish clans =

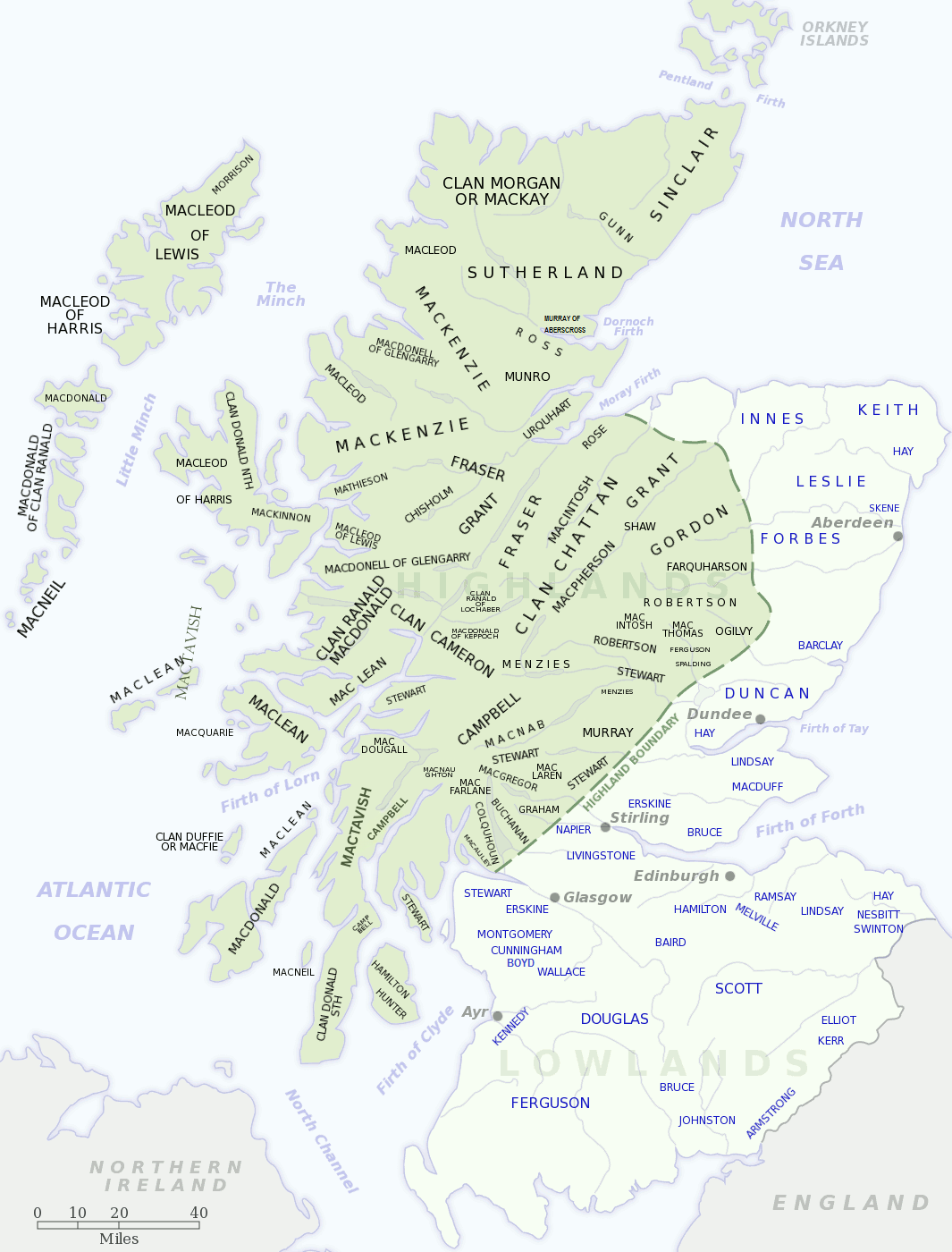
Clan map of Scotland

The following is a list of Scottish clans (with and without chiefs) – including, when known, their heraldic crest badges, tartans, mottoes, and other information.

The crest badges used by members of Scottish clans are based upon armorial bearings recorded by the Lord Lyon King of Arms in the Public Register of All Arms and Bearings in Scotland. The blazon of the heraldic crest is given, and the heraldic motto with its translation into English. While all the crest badges of the clan names listed are recognised by the Lord Lyon King of Arms, only about one half of these (about 140) have a clan chief who is acknowledged by the Lord Lyon King of Arms as the rightful claimant of the undifferenced arms upon which the crest badges are based.

Scottish crest badges are heraldic badges used by members of Scottish clans to show their allegiance to a specific clan or clan chief. Even though they are commonly used by clan members, the heraldic crest and motto within the crest badge belong only to the clan chief – never the clan member. A Scottish clan member's crest badge is made up of a heraldic crest, encircled by a strap and buckle which contains a heraldic motto. In most cases, both crest and motto are derived from the crest and motto of the chief's coat of arms. Crest badges intended for wear as cap badges are commonly made of silver or some other metal such as pewter. In the case of armigers they wear their own crest within a plain circlet showing their own motto or slogan, not a belt and buckle showing the chief's. Women may wear a crest badge as a brooch to pin a sash of their clan tartan at the right shoulder of their gown or blouse. Female clan chiefs, chieftains, or the wives of clan chiefs normally wear a tartan sash pinned at their left shoulder.

Today, Scottish crest badges are commonly used by members of Scottish clans. However, much like clan tartans, Scottish crest badges do not have a long history, and owe much to Victorian era romanticism, and the dress of the Highland regiments. Scottish crest badges have only been worn by clan members on the bonnet since the 19th century.

Highland and Island clans
Lowland and Border clans

Clan name	Crest badge	Clan tartan	Blazon of crest & motto within crest badge; war cry and plant badge	Clan chief; and clan seat, or historical seat	Notes
Abercromby			Crest: A falcon rising belled Proper. Motto: Petit alta [Latin, 'He seeks high deeds']	Chief: none, armigerous clan Seat: Abercrombie, Fife	
Abernethy			Crest: A raven sable, beaked and membered gules. Motto: Salus per Christum [Latin, 'Salvation through Christ']	Chief: none, armigerous clan Seat: Abernethy, Perth and Kinross	
Adair			Crest: A man's head couped and bloody. Motto: Loyal au mort [French, 'Loyal unto death']	Chief: none, armigerous clan	The crest and motto are derived from the arms of Adair of Kinhilt.
Adam			Crest: A cross crosslet fitchée gules surmounted by a sword in saltire Proper Motto: Crux mihi grata quies [Latin, 'The cross gives me welcome rest']	Chief: none, armigerous clan Seat: Blair Adam, estate in Kinross-shire	
Agnew			Crest: An eagle issuant and reguardant Proper. Motto: Consilio non petu [Latin, 'By wisdom not force']	Chief: Sir Crispin Agnew of Lochnaw, 11th Baronet Seat: Lochnaw Castle, Dumfries and Galloway	
Aikenhead			Crest: A demi-savage holding in his dexter hand three laurel slips fructed Proper Motto: Rupto robore nati [Latin, 'We are born in a weak condition']	Chief: none, armigerous clan Seat: Aikenhead, Lanarkshire	
Ainslie			Crest: Issuing out of a cap of maintenance a naked arm embowed grasping a scymitar all Proper Motto: Pro patria saepe pro rege semper [Latin, 'For country often, for king always']	Chief: none, armigerous clan Seat: Dolphinstone Castle (ruin), Jedburgh	
Aiton			Crest: A hand pulling a rose Proper Motto: Decerptae dabunt odorum [Latin, 'Roses plucked will give sweet smell']	Chief: none, armigerous clan Seat: Ayton, Berwickshire	
Allardice			Crest: A demi-savage holding in the dexter hand a scimitar all Proper Motto: In defence of the distressed	Chief: none, armigerous clan Seat: Allardice Castle, Kincardineshire	Wear Graham as set of that clan.
Anderson			Crest: An oak tree Proper.{Lyon Court Records 1673/5: Book 1, folio 239 as recorded for James Anderson of Westerairdbreck and also grant by Lord Lyon 20 March 1992 book 73, folio 78: to David Alexander Richard Waterton-Anderson, a descendant of the original grantee} Motto: Stand sure, as witnessed by armorial stones at Westerton, Banffshire dated 1664 and Botriphnie dated 1671; also by grant of Lord Lyon 20 March 1992 book 73, folio 78 to David Alexander Richard Waterton-Anderson.	Chief: none, armigerous clan	This motto has been used by the leading house of Andersons from at least 1664 and adopted for use as a clan member's crest badge
Anstruther			Crest: Two arms in armour holding a pole-axe with both hands gauntleted Proper. Motto: Periissem ni periissem [Latin, 'I would have perished had I not persisted']	Chief: Tobias Anstruther of that Ilk Seat: Balcaskie House, Fife	In note No. 12 of Waverley, Sir Walter Scott, while discussing canting of arms in heraldry wrote, "The Periissem ni per-iissem of the Anstruthers is liable to a similar objection. One of that ancient race, finding that an antagonist, with whom he had fixed a friendly meeting, was determined to take the opportunity of assassinating him, prevented the hazard by dashing out his brains with a battle-axe. Two sturdy arms, brandishing such a weapon, form the usual crest of the family, with the above motto, Periissem ni per-iissem—'I had died, unless I had gone through with it'".
Arbuthnott			Crest: A peacock's head couped at the neck Proper. Motto: Laus Deo [Latin, 'Praise God']	Chief: Keith Arbuthnott 17th Viscount of Arbuthnott Seat: Arbuthnott House, Arbuthnott, Aberdeenshire	
Armstrong			Crest: An arm from the shoulder, armed Proper. Motto: Invictus maneo [Latin, 'I remain unvanquished']	Chief: none, armigerous clan Seat: Gilnockie Tower, Dumfries and Galloway	
Arnott				Chief: none, armigerous clan Seat: Arnott, Portmoak in Kinross-shire	
Arthur			Crest: Two laurel branches in orle Proper. Motto: Fide et opera [Latin, 'By fidelity and labour'] Plant badge: wild myrtle (bog myrtle), or fir club moss	Chief: John Alexander MacArthur of that Ilk Seat: Castle Kennedy House, Castle Kennedy, Wigtownshire	
Auchinleck			Crest: An ear of rye Proper Motto: Pretiosum quod utile [Latin, 'What is useful is valuable']	Chief: none, armigerous clan Seat: Auchinleck	
Baillie			Crest: A boar's head erased Proper. Motto: Quid clarius astris [Latin, 'What is brighter than the stars']	Chief: none, armigerous clan	
Baird			Crest: A gryphon's head erased Proper. Motto: Dominus fecit [Latin, 'The Lord has done this']	Chief: none	In August 2019 Sir James Baird, 11th Bt. of Saughtonhall petitioned for the Chiefship. Petition under review as of Summer 2021. Also in August 2019 Richard Holman Baird was commissioned commander to serve a term up to 5 years.
Balfour			Crest: A dexter arm in armour erect the hand holding a baton in bend gules tipped argent Motto: Fordward [Scots, 'Forward']	Chief: none, armigerous clan Seat: Burleigh Castle	
Bannatyne			Crest: A demi griffin, in his dexter paw a sword erect Proper. Motto: Nec cito nec tarde [Latin, 'Neither fast nor slow']	Chief: none, armigerous clan	
Bannerman			Crest: A demi man in armour holding in his right hand a sword Proper. Motto: Pro patria [Latin, 'For my country']	Chief: David Gordon Bannerman of Elsick, 15th Baronet	The ancestors of the Bannermans were hereditary banner-bearers to the kings of Scotland.
Barclay			Crest: (On a chapeau doubled ermine) a hand holding a dagger Proper. Motto: Aut agere aut mori [Latin, 'Either to do or die']	Chief: Peter Barclay of Towie Barclay and of that Ilk Seat: Towie Barclay Castle, Aberdeenshire	
Baxter			Crest: A lion rampant guardant sable Motto: Vincit veritas [Latin, 'Truth prevails']	Chief: none, armigerous clan	
Bell			Crest: Viz. azure, three bells, the crest, a hand holding a dagger, paleways proper, with the motto, "I beir the bel." Motto: I beir the bel	Chief: in the process, armigerous clan. Seat: Middlebie	
Belshes			Crest: A greyhound's head couped argent collared azure. Motto: Fulget virtus intaminata [Latin, 'Virtue shines unstained']	Chief: none, armigerous clan	
Bethune			Crest: An otter's head erased argent. Motto: De bonnaire [French, 'Gracious']	Chief: none, armigerous clan	
Beveridge			Crest: Out of a mural crown Or a demi beaver Proper Motto: Perseverando [Latin, 'By persevering']	Chief: none, armigerous clan Seat: Brucefield, estate in Fife	
Binning				Chief: none, armigerous clan Seat: Barony of Binning, in the parish of Uphall, West Lothian	
Bissett			Crest: The trunk of an oak tree sprouting afresh Proper Motto: Abscissa virescit [Latin, 'That torn down regrows']	Chief: none, armigerous clan	The chiefly line is thought to be Bisset of Lessendrum.
Blackadder				Chief: none, armigerous clan Seat: Old Tulliallan Castle, Kincardine, Fife	
Blackstock				Chief: none, armigerous clan	
Blair			Crest: A stag lodged Proper Motto: Amo probos [Latin, 'I love the virtuous']	Chief: none, armigerous clan Seat: Blair, Ayrshire	
Blane			Crest: The sword of Justice paleways Proper Motto: Pax aut bellum [Latin, 'Peace or war']	Chief: none, armigerous clan	
Blyth				Chief: none, armigerous clan Seat: Lauderdale	
Borthwick			Crest: A moor's head couped Proper wreathed argent and sable. Motto: Qui conducit [Latin, 'He who leads']	Chief: John Hugh Borthwick of that Ilk, 24th Lord Borthwick Seat: Borthwick Castle, Lothian	
Boswell			Crest: A falcon Proper, hooded gules, jessed and belled Or Motto: Vraye foi [Middle French, 'True faith']	Chief: none, armigerous clan	
Boyd			Crest: A dexter hand erect and pale having the outer fingers bowed inwards. Motto: Confido [Latin, 'I trust']	Chief: Robin Jordan Boyd, 8th Baron Kilmarnock Seat: Dean Castle, Ayrshire	Alastair Boyd, 7th Baron Kilmarnock died 19 March 2009, but references continue to list him as Chief: see Burks, Standing council, and only House of Boyd aka Clan Boyd has updated information regarding their Chief Boyd clan web site
Boyle			Crest: A double headed eagle displayed, parted per pale embattled gules and argent. Motto: Dominus providebit [Latin, 'The Lord will provide']	Chief: Patrick Robin Archibald Boyle, 10th Earl of Glasgow Seat: Kelburn Castle, North Ayrshire	
Brisbane			Crest: A stork's head erased holding in her beak a serpent nowed Proper Motto: Dabit otia Deus [Latin, 'God will give repose']	Chief: none, armigerous clan Seat: Killincraig, Largs, North Ayrshire	
Brodie			Crest: A right hand holding a bunch of arrows all Proper. Motto: Unite; Plant badge: periwinkle	Chief: Alexander Tristan Duff Brodie of Brodie Seat: Brodie Castle, Morayshire	
Broun			Crest: A lion rampant, holding in the dexter paw a fleur de lis Or Floreat magestas (Let majesty flourish) Motto: Floreat magestas [Latin, 'Let majesty flourish']	Chief: Sir Wayne Broun of Coultson, Bt. Seat: Colstoun House, East Lothian	
Bruce			Crest: A lion stantan azure armed and langued gules. Motto: Fuimus [Latin, 'We have been'] Plant badge: rosemary	Chief: Andrew Douglas Alexander Thomas Bruce, 11th Earl of Elgin Seat: Broomhall House, Dunfermline	
Buchan			Crest: (upon a chapeau gules furred ermine) A sun shining upon a sunflower full blown Proper. Motto: Non inferiora secutus [Latin, 'Not having followed mean pursuits']	Chief: David Buchan of Auchmacoy Seat: Auchmacoy House, Aberdeenshire	
Buchanan			Crest: A dexter hand holding up a ducal cap (Proper), tufted on the top with a rose gules, within two laurel branches in orle (also Proper). Motto: Clarior hinc honos [Latin, 'Hence the brighter honour'] Plant badge: bilberry (blaeberry), oak, or birch	Chief: John Michael Baillie-Hamilton Buchanan of that Ilk and of Arnprior. Seat: Cambusmore House, Callander, Stirlingshire	Lord Lyon, King of Arms, granted the petition for Chief of the Name and Arms of Buchanan in August 2018.
Butter			Crest: Two hands issuing from a cloud in dexter, extended to the sinister and drawing an arrow in a bow all Proper Motto: Diriget Deus [Latin, 'God directs']	Chief: none, armigerous clan Seat: Fascally, by Pitlochry, Perthshire	
Byres			Crest: A cock reguardant Proper Motto: Marte suo tutus [Latin, 'Safe by his own exertions']	Chief: none, armigerous clan Seat: Byses Castle (ruin), Haddington, East Lothian	
Cairns				Chief: none, armigerous clan Seat: Mid Calder, West Lothian	
Calder				Chief: none, armigerous clan Seat: Cawdor Castle, Nairnshire	
Caldwell				Chief: none, armigerous clan Seat: Caldwell, East Renfrewshire	
Callender				Chief: none, armigerous clan Seat: Callander, Stirlingshire	
Cameron			Crest: A sheaf of five arrows points upwards Proper tied with a band gules. Motto: Aonaibh ri chéile [Scottish Gaelic, 'Unite'] Plant badge: crowberry, or oak	Chief: Donald Cameron, Baron Cameron of Lochiel Seat: Achnacarry Castle, Fort William, Highlands	
Campbell			Crest: On a boar's head erased fessways erased Or, armed argent, langued gules. Motto: Ne obliviscaris [Latin, 'Do not forget'] Plant badge: fir club moss, or wild myrtle (bog myrtle)	Chief: Torquhil Ian Campbell, 13th Duke of Argyll Seat: Inveraray Castle, Argyll and Bute	Though abundant in Argyll, bog myrtle drops its leaves in winter.
Campbell of Breadalbane			Crest: A boar's head erased Proper. Motto: Follow me	Chief: none, armigerous clan Seat: Breadalbane	
Campbell of Cawdor			Crest: A swan, Proper, crowned, Or. Motto: Be mindful	Chief: Colin Campbell, 7th Earl Cawdor Seat: Cawdor Castle, Nairnshire	
Campbell of Possil			Crest: A Boar's head erect, erased Or armed and langued azure. Motto: Fac et spera [Latin, 'Do and hope']		
Carmichael			Crest: A dexter hand and arm in pale armed and holding a broken spear Proper. Motto: Tout jour prest [French, 'Always ready']	Chief: Richard Carmichael of Carmichael Seat: Carmichael, South Lanarkshire	
Carnegie			Crest: A thunderbolt Proper, winged Or. Motto: Dred God	Chief: David Carnegie, 4th Duke of Fife Seat: Elsick House, Stonehaven, Kincardineshire	
Carruthers			Crest: A seraphim volant Proper Motto: Promptus et fidelis [Latin, 'Ready and faithful'] Plant badge: Gorse (Ulex europaeus)	Chief: Simon Peter Carruthers of Holmains, Chief of the Name and Arms of Carruthers	
Cathcart			Crest: A dexter hand couped above the wrist and erect Proper, grasping a crescent argent. Motto: I hope to speed	Chief: Charles Alan Andrew Cathcart, 7th Earl Cathcart Seat: Gateley Hall	
Chalmers			Crest: The head and neck of a lion sable langued gules Motto: Avance [French, 'Advance']	Chief: none, armigerous clan	
Charteris			Crest: A dexter hand holding up a dagger paleways Proper. Motto: This is our charter	Chief: James Charteris, 13th Earl of Wemyss and 9th Earl of March Seat: Gosford House, East Lothian	
Chattan			Crest: A cat salient Proper. Motto: Touch not the cat bot a glove Plant badge: wild whortleberry	Captain: Malcolm K. MacKintosh of Clan Chattan	A unique federation of smaller clans such as Clan Macpherson, Clan Macbean and Clan Macphail led by Clan Macintosh.
Cheyne			Crest: A cross pattée fitchée argent Motto: Patientia vincit [Latin, 'Patience conquers']	Chief: none, armigerous clan Seat: Esslemont, Aberdeenshire	
Chisholm			Crest: A dexter hand holding a dagger erect Proper, the point thereof transfixing a boar's head erased Or. Motto: Feros ferio [Latin, 'I am fierce with the fierce'] Plant badge: fern	Chief: Hamish Chisholm of Chisholm	
Clelland			Crest: A falcon upon a glove sinister Proper Motto: For sport	Chief: none, armigerous clan Seat: Cleland, North Lanarkshire	See also: 18th century Clevland family of Tapley, North Devon.
Clephane			Crest: A hand holding a helmet Proper Motto: Ut sim paratior [Latin, 'That I May Be the More Ready']	Chief: none, armigerous clan Seat: Carslogie, Fife	
Cochrane			Crest: A horse passant argent Motto: Virtute et labour [Latin, 'By valour and exertion']	Chief: Iain Alexander Douglas Blair Cochrane, 15th Earl of Dundonald, 6th Marquess of Maranhão Seat: Lochnell Castle, Argyllshire	
Cockburn			Crest: A cock crowing Proper. Motto: Accendit cantu [Latin, 'He rouses us with song']	Chief: none, armigerous clan	
Colquhoun			Crest: A hart's head couped gules, attired argent. Motto: Si je puis [French, 'If I can'] Plant badge: hazel, or dogberry	Chief: Sir Malcolm Rory Colquhoun of Luss, 9th Baronet Seat: Rossdhu Mansion, Argyll & Bute	
Colville			Crest: A hind's head couped at the neck argent. Motto: Oublier ne puis [French, 'I cannot forget']	Chief: Charles Mark Townshend Colville, 5th Viscount Colville of Culross	
Congilton			Crest: A bee Proper Motto: Magna in parvo [Latin, 'Much in little']	Chief: none, armigerous clan	
Craig			Crest: A chevalier on horseback in full charge grasping a broken lance in bend Proper. Mottos: J’ai bonne esperance [French, 'I have good hope'] Vive Deo et vives [Latin, 'Live for God and you shall have life']	Chief: none, armigerous clan Seat: Riccarton	The last chief was Thomas Craig of Riccarton who died on 13 March 1823
Cranstoun			Crest: A crane Proper dormant holding a stone in her claw. Motto: Thou shalt want ere I want	Chief: David Cranston of that Ilk and Corehouse	
Crawford			Crest: A stag's head erased gules, between the attires a cross crosslet fitchée sable. Motto: Tutum te robore reddam [Latin, 'I will give you safety through strength']	Chief: none, armigerous clan	
Crichton			Crest: A dragon spouting out fire Proper. Motto: God send grace	Chief: David Maitland Makgill Crichton of that Ilk Seat: Monzie Castle, Crieff	
Crosbie			Crest: Out of a mount the trunk of a tree sprouting out new branches all Proper Motto: Resurgam [Latin, 'I shall rise again']	Chief: none, armigerous clan	
Cumming			Crest: A lion rampant Or, in his dexter paw a dagger Proper. Motto: Courage; Plant badge: cumin	Chief: Sir Alexander Penrose Gordon Cumming of Altyre, 7th Bt. Seat: Altyre House, Morayshire	Cumin plant is not even native to Britain. The 19th-century writer James Logan attributed the clan with this plant. The clan's association with this badge was questioned by at least one other 19th-century writer.
Cunningham			Crest: A unicorn's head couped argent, armed Or. Motto: Over fork over	Chief: Sir John Christopher Foggo Montgomery Cunninghame of Kilmaurs, Baronet of Corsehill	
Dalmahoy			Crest: A hand brandishing a sword aloft Proper Motto: Absque metu [Latin, 'Without fear']	Chief: none, armigerous clan Seat: barony of Dalmahoy, Midlothian	
Dalrymple			Crest: A rock Proper. Motto: Firm	Chief: none, armigerous clan Seat: Dalrymple	
Dalziel			Crest: A dagger paleways azure, hilted and pommelled Or. Motto: I dare	Chief: none, armigerous clan Seat: Dalziel	
Darroch			Crest: On a chapeau gules furred miniver a demi-Negro, in his dexter hand a dagger Proper. Motto: Be watchfull	Chief: Duncan Darroch of Gourock	
Davidson			Crest: A stag's head erased Proper. Motto: Sapienter si sincere [Latin, 'Wisely if sincerely'] Plant badge: boxwood, or red whortleberry	Chief: Alister Davidson of Davidston	Of the old blood of the Clan Chattan Federation.
Dennistoun			Crest: A dexter arm in pale Proper, clothed gules, (issuing out of the Wreath) and holding an antique shield sable charged with a mullet Or Motto: Adversa vurtute repello [Latin, 'I repel adversity with fortitude']	Chief: none, armigerous clan	
Dewar			Crest: Issuant from a crest coronet Or of four (three visible) strawberry leaves, a dexter arm vambraced, brandishing a sword Proper, hilted and pommelled Or. Motto: Quid non pro patria [Latin, 'What would one not do for his country']	Chief: Michael Kenneth Dewar of that Ilk and Vogrie	
Donaghey aka Clan Duncan aka Clan Robertson/ Clan Donnachaidh			Crest: A dexter hand holding up an imperial crown Proper. Motto: Virtutis gloria merces [Latin, 'Glory is the reward of valour'] Plant badge: bracken, or fern	Chief: Alexander Gilbert Haldane Robertson	The Celtic Magazine of 1884 states that this badge (fern), compared to fine leaved heath, is the older badge.
Douglas			Crest: On a chapeau gules furred ermine, a salamander vert encircled with flames of fire Proper. Motto: Jamais arrière [French, 'Never behind']	Chief: none, armigerous clan	The Douglas-Hamiltons are heirs to the chiefship, however the Lord Lyon requires them to assume the single name Douglas for them to be granted the title of chief.
Drummond			Crest: On a crest coronet Or, a goshhawk wings displayed Proper, armed and belled Or, jessed gules. Motto: Virtutem coronat honos [Latin, 'Honour crowns virtue'] Plant badge: holly, or wild thyme	Chief: James David Drummond, 19th Earl of Perth	
Dunbar			Crest: A horse's head argent, bridled and reined gules. Motto: In promptu [Latin, 'In readiness']	Chief: Sir James Dunbar of Mochrum, 14th Bt. Seat: Mochrum Castle, Dumfries and Galloway	
Duncan				Chief: John Duncan, armigerous clan	The Clan for present is being led by the head of The Territorial House of Duncan of Sketraw
Dundas			Crest: A lion's head affrontée looking through a bush of oak Proper. Motto: Essayez [French, 'Try']	Chief: David Dundas of Dundas	David Dundas of Dundas has not been heard from in over 30 years. It remains uncertain if he is still alive.
Dunlop			Crest: A dexter hand holding a dagger erect all Proper Motto: Merito [Latin, 'Deservedly']	Chief: James Stuart Wallace Dunlop, Dunlop of that Ilk. Seat: Dunlop, in Cunningham, Ayrshire	
Durie			Crest: A crescent Or Motto: Confido [Latin, 'I trust']	Chief: Andrew Durie of Durie	
Edmonstone			Crest: A swan's head and neck Proper. Swan signifies musicality. Formerly: A camel's head and neck Proper (time of change uncertain) Motto: Virtus auget honorem [Latin, 'Virtue increases honour']	Chief: Sir Archibald Bruce Charles Edmonstone of Duntreath, 7th Bt Seat: Duntreath, Glasgow	
Eliott			Crest: A hand couped at the wrist in armour holding a cutlass in bend Proper. Motto: Fortiter et recte [Latin, 'Boldly and rightly']	Chief: Margaret Eliott of Redheugh Seat: Redheugh, Roxburghshire	
Elphinstone			Crest: A lady, from the waist upwards, richly habited in red, her arms extended, the right hand supporting a tower and the left holding a branch of laurel, all Proper Motto: Cause causit [Latin, 'Cause caused it']	Chief: The Rt Hon. Lord Elphinstone	
Erskine			Crest: On a chapeau gules furred ermine a hand holding up a skene in pale argent, hilted and pommelled Or. Motto: Je pense plus [French, 'I think more']	Chief: James Thorne Erskine, 14th Earl of Mar and 16th Earl of Kellie	
Ewing			Crest: A demi-lion rampant holding in its dexter paw a star or mullet Motto: Audaciter [Latin, 'Boldly']	Chief: none, armigerous clan	The Ewing coat of arms appears in the Workman Armorial dated 1566.
Fairlie			Crest: A lion's head couped Or Motto: Paratus sum [Latin, 'I am prepared']	Chief: none, armigerous clan Seat: Fairley, Ayrshire	The Fairleys of Braid have arms appearing in the Crawford Armorials, Queen Mary's Roll, Dunvegan Roll, among others.
Falconer			Crest: An angel in a praying posture Or, within an orle of laurel proper Motto: Vive ut vivas [Latin, 'Live that you may have life']	Chief: none, armigerous clan	Septs: Falconer, Falkner, Faulkner, Faulknor, Fawkner
Farquharson			Crest: On a chapeau gules furred ermine, a demi-lion gules holding in his dexter paw a sword Proper. Motto: Fide et fortitudine [Latin, 'By fidelity and fortitude'] Plant badge: Scots fir, red whortleberry, or foxglove	Chief: Alwyne Farquharson of Invercauld	Part of the Clan Chattan Federation through its association with Clan Shaw.
Fenton				Chief: none, armigerous clan Seat: Fenton, Dirleton, East Lothian	
Fergusson			Crest: Upon a chapeau gules furred ermine, a bee on a thistle Proper. Motto: Dulcius ex asperis [Latin, 'Sweeter after difficulties'] Plant badge: little sunflower	Chief: Sir Charles Fergusson of Kilkerran, 9th Bt.	
Fleming			Crest: A goat's head erased argent, armed Or Motto: Let the deed shaw	Chief: none, armigerous clan	
Fletcher			Crest: A demi bloodhound azure, langued gules, gorged with a ducal crown Or Motto: Dieu pour nous [French, 'God for us']	Chief: none, armigerous clan Seat: Glenorchie, Argyll	Many clan immigrated to the United States and Canada after clearances by the Earl of Breadalbane. The fourteenth and last chief died in New York in 1911.
Forbes			Crest: A stag's head attired with ten tines Proper. Motto: Grace me guide Plant badge: broom	Chief: Lord Malcolm Nigel Forbes, 23rd Lord Forbes Seat: Castle Forbes, Aberdeenshire	
Forrester			Crest: A hound's head erased Proper collared gules Motto: Blaw hunter blaw thy horn	Chief: none, armigerous clan Seat: Corstorphine Castle (demolished), Corstorphine, Lothian	
Forsyth			Crest: A griffin sergeant azure, armed and membered sable, crowned Or. Motto: Instaurator ruinae [Latin, 'A repairer of ruin']	Chief: Alister Forsyth of that Ilk	
Fotheringham			Crest: A) A griffin segreant Proper (Fotheringham) Motto: A) Be it fast Crest: B) A lion's paw erased holding a scimitar Proper; Motto: B) Dissipate [Latin, 'Disperse']	Chief: none, armigerous clan Seat: Powrie, Inverarity, Forfarshire	
Fraser			Crest: On a mount a flourish of strawberries leaved and fructed Proper. Motto: All my hope is in God; Plant badge: yew	Chief: Katharine Fraser, 22nd Lady Saltoun	
Fraser of Lovat			Crest: A buck's head erased Proper. Motto: Je suis prest [French, 'I am ready'].	Chief: Simon Fraser, 18th Lord Lovat Seat: Beaufort Castle, Aberdeenshire	
Fullarton			Crest: An otter's head erased gules Motto: Lux in tenebris [Latin, 'Light in darkness']	Chief: none, armigerous clan Seat: barony of Fullarton, Ayrshire	
Galbraith			Crest: A bear's head couped argent muzzled azure. Motto: Ab obice suavior [Latin, 'Gentler because of the obstruction']	Chief: none, armigerous clan	The chiefs were The Galbraith of Culcreuch (untraceable since about 1700).
Galloway			Crest: A mound, bespread with the rays of the sun Proper embraced between two corn-ears in saltire, and ensigned with a crosslet Or Motto: Higher	Chief: none, armigerous clan	
Gardyne			Crest: Two dexter hands conjoined Proper upholding a cross crosslet fitchée Or Motto: Cruciata cruce junguntur [Latin, 'Troubles are connected with the cross']	Chief: none, armigerous clan Seat: Gardyne Castle	
Gartshore			Crest: An eagle displayed Proper Motto: Renew my age	Chief: none, armigerous clan Seat: Gartshore, Kirkintilloch, Dunbartonshire	
Gayre				Chief: Reinold Gayre of Gayre and Nigg	
Ged			Crest: A pike's head Proper. Motto: Durat ditat placet [Latin, 'It sustains, it enriches, it pleases']	Chief: none, armigerous clan	The crest, of a pike, is a pun on the clan name Ged; a ged in heraldry is a pike.
Gibsone				Chief: none, armigerous clan	
Gladstains				Chief: none, armigerous clan	
Glas				Chief: none, armigerous clan	
Glen				Chief: none, armigerous clan	
Glendinning				Chief: none, armigerous clan	
Gordon			Crest: Issuant from a crest coronet Or a stag's head (affrontée) Proper attired with ten tines Or. Motto: Bydand [Scots, 'Abiding', 'Steadfast', an adjectival use of the Middle Scots present participle of bide; or from Latin, 'Remaining']. Plant badge: ivy	Chief: Granville Charles Gomer Gordon, 13th Marquess of Huntly Seat: Aboyne Castle, Aberdeenshire	
Graham			Crest: A falcon Proper, beaked and armed Or, killing a stork argent, Armed gules. Motto: Ne oublie [French, 'Do not forget'] Plant badge: spurge laurel	Chief: James Graham, 8th Duke of Montrose Seat: Buchanan Castle, Stirlingshire	
Grant			Crest: A burning hill Proper. Motto: Craig elachie [Scottish Gaelic, 'The rock of alarm'] Plant badge: pine (Scots fir)	Chief: James Patrick Trevor Grant of Grant, 6th Baron Strathspey	
Gray			Crest: An anchor in pale Or. Motto: Anchor fast anchor	Chief: none, armigerous clan	In 1950 the Lord Lyon barred those with double-barrelled names from the chiefship of clans. At the time Lord Gray had been chief of Clan Gray.
Gregor			Crest: A lion's head erased Proper, crowned with an antique crown Or. Motto: 'S rioghal mo dhream [Scottish Gaelic, 'My race is royal'] Plant badge: pine (Scots fir)	Chief: Sir Malcolm Gregor MacGregor of MacGregor, 7th Bart.	Clan of the historical figure Rob Roy MacGregor.
Grierson			Crest: A fetterlock argent. Motto: Hoc securior [Latin, 'More secure by this'] Plant badge: Scottish bluebell	Chief: Madam Sarah Anne Grierson of Lag	Clan of the notable baronet, Auld Lag, whom Sir Walter Scott based a character on in his novel Redgauntlet.
Gunn			Crest: A dexter hand wielding a sword in bend Proper. Motto: Aut pax aut bellum [Latin, 'Either peace or war'] Plant badge: juniper, or roseroot	Chief: Iain Alexander Gunn of Banniskirk	The elements within the crest badge are not derived from the chiefly arms. No undifferenced arms of the name Gunn have ever been recorded.
Guthrie			Crest: A dexter arm holding a drawn sword Proper. Motto: Sto pro veritate [Latin, 'I stand for the truth']	Chief: Alexander Guthrie of Guthrie	
Haig			Crest: A rock Proper. Motto: Tyde what may	Chief: Alexander Douglas Derrick Haig, 3rd Earl Haig Seat: Bemersyde, Roxburghshire	
Haldane			Crest: An eagle's head erased Or Motto: Suffer	Chief: Martin Haldane of Gleneagles Seat: Gleneagles, Perthshire	
Haliburton			Crest: A negro's head couped at the shoulders and armed with a helmet Proper Motto: Watch well	Chief: none, armigerous clan Seat: Haliburton, Berwickshire	
Halkerston			Crest: A falcon's head erased Proper Motto: In ardua nitor [Latin, 'I endeavour in difficulties']	Chief: none, armigerous clan Seat: Rathillet, Fife	
Halket			Crest: A falcon's head erased Proper Motto: Fides sufficit [Latin, 'Faith is sufficient']	Chief: none, armigerous clan Seat: Pitfirran, Fife	
Hall			Crest: A Talbot's head Motto: Vive ut vivas [Latin, 'Live, so that you may live']	Chief: none, armigerous clan Seat: Liddesdale, Roxburghshire	
Hamilton			Crest: In a ducal cornet an oak tree fructed and penetrated transversely in the main stem by a frame saw Proper, the frame Or. Motto: Through	Chief: Alexander Douglas-Hamilton, 16th Duke of Hamilton	
Hannay			Crest: A cross crosslet fitchée issuing out of a crescent sable. Motto: Per ardua ad alta [Latin, 'Through difficulties to higher things']	Chief: David Hannay of Kirkdale and of that Ilk.	
Harris				Chief: none, armigerous clan	
Hay or Leith			Crest: Issuing out of a crest coronet a falcon volant Proper, armed, jessed and belted Or. Motto: Serva jugum [Latin, 'Keep the yoke'] Plant badge: mistletoe	Chief: Merlin Sereld Victor Gilbert Hay, 24th Earl of Erroll	
Henderson			Crest: A cubit arm Proper the hand holding an estoile Or surmounted by a crescent azure. Motto: Sola virtus nobilitat [Latin, 'Virtue alone ennobles'] Plant badge: cotton grass	Chief: Alistair Donald Henderson of Fordell	
Hepburn			Crest: A horse's head couped argent, bridled gules. Motto: Keep tryst	Chief: none, armigerous clan	
Heron			Crest: A Demi lion argent holding in his dexter paw a cross crosslet fitchée gules Motto: Par valeur [French, 'By bravery']	Chief: none, armigerous clan Seat: Heron, Kirkcudbrightshire	
Herries			Crest: A stag's head with ten tynes argent. Motto: Dominus dedit [Latin, 'The Lord has given']	Chief: none, armigerous clan	
Hogg			Crest: An oak tree Proper Motto: Dat gloria vires [Latin, 'A good name gives strength']	Chief: none, armigerous clan Seat: Newliston House, Kirkliston, Lothian	
Hogarth			Crest: A pegasus Motto: Candor dat viribus alas [Latin, 'Sincerity gives wings to strength']	Chief: William Hogarth Seat: Berwickshire and later Firhil	
Home			Crest: On a cap of maintenance Proper, a lion's head erased argent. Motto: A home. A home. A home. Plant badge: broom	Chief: Michael David Alexander Douglas-Home, 16th Earl of Home	
Hope			Crest: A broken terrestrial globe surmounted by a rainbow issuing out of a cloud at each end all Proper. Motto: At spes infracta [Latin, 'But hope is unbroken']	Chief: Sir John Hope of Craighall, Bt.	The motto is a pun on the clan name.
Hopkirk			Crest: A dexter hand in armour erect and couped at the elbow the hand Proper pointing to a crescent in dexter chief argent Motto: Spero procedere [Latin, 'I hope to prosper']	Chief: none, armigerous clan	
Horsburgh				Chief: none, armigerous clan	
Houston			Crest: A sand-glass Proper. Motto: In time	Chief: none, armigerous clan Seat: Houston, Renfrewshire	
Hunter			Crest: A greyhound sejant Proper, gorged with an antique crown Or. Motto: Cursum perficio [Latin, 'I accomplish the hunt']	Chief: Pauline Hunter of Hunterston Seat: Hunterston	
Hutton				Chief: none, armigerous clan	
Inglis			Crest: A demi lion rampant Argent. Motto: Nobilis Est Ira Leonis [Latin, 'The lion's anger is noble']	Chief: none, armigerous clan Seat: Craigend Castle, Mugdock Country Park, East Dunbartonshire (passed to the Buchanans)	In 1395, Sir William Inglis won a duel against Sir Thomas Struthers. The following year, the family was rewarded with the Barony of Manner which was later sold in 1709.
Innes			Crest: A boar's head erased Proper. Motto: Be traist Plant badge: great bulrush	Chief: none, armigerous clan	The Duke of Roxburghe is arguably the chief of Clan Innes, however he cannot be so recognised as he retains the name Innes-Ker.
Irvine			Crest: A sheaf of holly consisting of nine leaves vert slipped and banded gules. Motto: Sub sole sub umbra virens [Latin, 'Flourishing both in sunshine and in shade']	Chief: Alexander Irvine of Drum, 27th Baron of Drum Seat: Drum Castle, Aberdeenshire	
Irving			Crest: An arm gauntleted holding a branch of holly consisting of seven leaves all proper. Motto: Haud ullis labentia ventis [Latin, 'Yielding under no winds']	Chief: Rupert Irving of Bonshaw Seat: Bonshaw Tower, Dumfriesshire	
Jardine			Crest: A spur rowel of six points Proper. Motto: Cave adsum [Latin, 'Beware I am present']	Chief: Sir William Murray Jardine of Applegirth, 13th Bt.	
Johnstone			Crest: A winged spur Or. Motto: Nunquam non paratus [Latin, 'Never unprepared'] Plant badge: red hawthorn	Chief: Patrick Andrew Wentworth Johnstone of Annandale and of that Ilk, 11th Earl of Annandale and Hartfell	
Keith			Crest: Out of a crest coronet Or, a roebuck's head Proper, attired Or. Motto: Veritas vincit [Latin, 'Truth conquers']	Chief: James William Falconer Keith, 14th Earl of Kintore Seat: Keith Hall, Aberdeenshire	
Kelly				Chief: none, armigerous clan	
Kennedy			Crest: A dolphon naiant Proper. Motto: Avise la fin [French, 'Consider the end'] Plant badge: oak	Chief: David Thomas Kennedy, 9th Marquess of Ailsa	
Kerr			Crest: The sun in his splendour Or. Motto: Sero sed serio [Latin, 'Late but in earnest']	Chief: Michael Andrew Foster Jude Kerr, 13th Marquess of Lothian	
Kincaid			Crest: A triple towered castle argent, masoned sable, and issuing from the centre tower a dexter arm from the shoulder embowed, vested in the proper tartan of Kincaid and grasping a drawn sword all Proper. Motto: This I'll defend	Chief: Arabella Kincaid of Kincaid	
Kinloch			Crest: A young eagle perched and looking up to the sun in splendour all Proper Motto: Non degener [Latin, 'Not degenerate']	Chief: none, armigerous clan	
Kinnaird			Crest: A crescent arising from a cloud having a star issuing from between its horns, all within two branches of palm disposed in orle Proper. Motto: Errantia lumina fallunt [Latin, 'Wandering lights deceive']	Chief: none, armigerous clan	
Kinnear			Crest: Two anchors in saltire Proper. Motto: I live in hope	Chief: The clan, although not ruled by a chief, has a senior male in the way of Malcolm MacIntyre Kinnear; armigerous clan	
Kinninmont			Crest: An oak tree vert. Motto: Stabo [Latin, 'I shall stand']	Chief: none, armigerous clan	
Kirkcaldy			Crest: A man's head with the face looking upwards Proper Motto: Fortissima veritas [Latin, 'Truth is the strongest']	Chief: none, armigerous clan Seat: Kirkcaldy, Fife	
Kirkpatrick			Crest: Upraised hand holding a dagger dripping blood Motto: I mak sikkar [Scots, 'I make sure']	Chief: none, armigerous clan	
Laing			Crest: A Dove, in the mouth a sprig of olive Motto: Misericordia est mea cupido [Latin, 'Mercy is my desire']	Chief: none, armigerous clan	
Lammie			Crest: A hand Proper holding a crosier Or Motto: Per varios casus [Latin, 'By various fortunes']	Chief: none, armigerous clan	
Lamont			Crest: A dexter hand couped at the wrist Proper. Motto: Ne parcus nec spernas [Latin, 'Neither spare nor dispose', 'Neither spare nor scorn'] Plant badge: crab-apple tree, or trefoil or dryas	Chief: The Rev. Father Peter Lamont of that Ilk	
Langlands				Chief: none, armigerous clan	
Learmonth				Chief: none, armigerous clan	
Leask			Crest: A crescent argent. Motto: Virtute cresco [Latin, 'I grow by virtue']	Chief: Jonathan Leask of that Ilk.	
Lennox			Crest: Two broadswords in saltire behind a swan's head and neck all Proper. Motto: I'll defend	Chief: Edward Lennox of that Ilk	
Leslie			Crest: A demi griffin Proper, armed, beaked and winged Or. Motto: Grip fast	Chief: James Malcolm David Leslie, 22nd Earl of Rothes	
Lindsay			Crest: Issuing from an antique ducal coronet Or, the head, neck and wings of a swan Proper. Motto: Endure fort [Latin, 'Endure boldly']	Chief: Anthony Robert Lindsay, 30th Earl of Crawford and 13th Earl of Balcarres	
Little			Crest: A demi lion sable powdered with saltires argent, armed gules, in dexter paw a cutlass Proper and in sinister a saltire argent Motto:Concedo nulli or Fidei coticula crux	Chief: none, armigerous clan	
Lockhart			Crest: On a chapeau gules furred ermine a boar's head erased argent, langued gules. Motto: Corda serrata pando [Latin, 'I open locked hearts']	Chief: Ranald William Angus Lockhart, 26th Baron of Lee	
Logan			Crest: A passion nail piercing a human heart, Proper. Motto: Hoc majorum virtus [Latin, 'This is valour of my ancestors'] Plant badge: furze	Chief: none, armigerous clan	
Logie				Chief: none, armigerous clan	
Lumsden			Crest: Issuant from a crest coronet Or a naked arm grasping a sword Proper. Motto: Amor patitur moras [Latin, 'Love endures delays']	Chief: Gillem Lumsden of that Ilk	
Lundin			Crest: A lion gules, issuant from an antique crown Or, holding in its dexter paw a sword erect and in its sinister a thistle slipped both Proper Motto: Dei dono sum quod sum [Latin, 'By the grace of God I am what I am']	Chief: none, armigerous clan	
Lyle			Crest: A cock Or, crested and barbed gules Motto: An I may	Chief: none, armigerous clan	
Lyon			Crest: Within a garland of bay leaves, a lady from the middle richly attired, holding in her dexter hand a thistle all Proper. Motto: In te Domine speravi [Latin, 'In thee o Lord have I put my trust']	Chief: Michael Fergus Bowes-Lyon, 18th Earl of Strathmore and Kinghorne	The crest alludes to the alliance of Sir John Lyon with the daughter of Robert II, Princess Jean.
MacAlister			Crest: A dexter arm in armour erect, the hand holding a dagger in pale all Proper. Motto: Fortiter [Latin, 'Boldly'] Plant badge: common heath (Scots heather)	Chief: William MacAlester of Loup and Kennox	
MacAlpin/e			Crest: A boar's head. Motto: Cuimhnich bàs Ailpein [Scottish Gaelic, 'Remember the death of Alpin'] Plant badge: pine (Scots fir)	Chief: none Commander: Michael T. McAlpin, Armigers: eight MacAlpine armigers	No chiefly arms have been recorded in the Lyon Register.
MacAulay			Crest: A boot couped at the ankle and theron a spur Proper. Motto: Dulce periculum [Latin, 'Danger is sweet']. or 'Sweet Danger'; Plant badge: pine (Scots fir), or cranberry	Chief: none, armigerous clan Seat: Ardencaple Castle, Argyll & Bute	No chiefly arms have been recorded in the Lyon Register.Note 7 August 2011 Hector MacAulay elected as "Chief of the Clan MacAulay Association", at the assoc
MacBain			Crest: A grey demi-cat-a-mountain salient, on his sinister foreleg a Highland targe gules. Motto: Touch not a catt bot a targe Plant badge: boxwood, or red whortleberry	Chief: James McBain of McBain	Of the old blood of the Clan Chattan Federation.
MacBrayne				Chief: none, armigerous clan	
MacDonald			Crest: On a crest coronet Or, a hand in armour fessways couped at the elbow Proper holding a cross crosslet fitchée gules. Motto: Per mare per terras [Latin, 'By sea, by land'] Plant badge: common heath (Scots heather)	Chief: Godfrey James Macdonald of Macdonald, 8th Baron Macdonald of Slate	
MacDonald of Clanranald			Crest: A triple-towered castle argent masoned sable, and issuing from the centre tower a dexter arm in armour embowed grasping a sword all Proper. Motto: My hope is constant in thee Plant badge: common heath (Scots heather)	Chief: Ranald Alexander MacDonald, Captain of Clanranald	
MacDonald of Keppoch			Crest: An eagle displayed, gules, crowned of a ducal coronet, Or. Plant badge: common heath (Scots heather), or white heather	Chief: Ranald Macdonald of Keppoch	
MacDonald of Sleat			Crest: A hand in armour fesswise holding a cross crosslet fitchée gules. Motto: Per mare per terras [Latin, 'By sea, by land']	Chief: Sir Ian MacDonald of Sleat, Bt.	
MacDonell of Glengarry			Crest: A raven Proper perching on a rock azure. Motto: Cragan an fhithich [Scottish Gaelic, 'The rock of the raven'] Plant badge: common heath (Scots heather)	Chief: Ranald MacDonnell of Glengarry	
MacDougall			Crest: (On a chapeau gules furred ermine) a dexter arm in armour embowed fessways couped Proper, holding a cross crosslet fitchée erect gules. Motto: Buaidh no bas [Scottish Gaelic, 'To conquer or die'] Plant badge: bell heather	Chief: Madame Morag MacDougall of MacDougall	
Mac Domhnaill			Motto: Seas le urram	Chief: Steven Mitchell of Clan Mac Domhnaill	
Macdowall			Crest: (issuant from a crest coronet Or) A lion's paw erased and erected Proper holding a dagger point upwards Proper, hilted and pommelled Or. Motto: Vincere vel mori [Latin, 'To conquer or die']	Chief: Fergus D. H. McDowall of Garthland	
McDowell			Crest: Lion Rampant Or (Gold), crowned gules (Red), holding a cross crosslet fitchée gules (Red). Motto: Timor Dei [Latin, 'Fear God'] Eagal Dhè [Scottish Gaelic, 'Fear of God']	Chief:	
MacDuff			Crest: A demi-lion gules holding in the dexter paw a broadsword erected in pale Proper, hilted and pommelled Or. Motto: Deus juvat [Latin, 'God assists'] Plant badge: boxwood, or red whortleberry	Chief: none, armigerous clan	
MacEwen (or MacEwan)			Crest: A trunk of an oak tree sprouting Proper. Motto: Reviresco [Latin, 'I grow strong again']	Chief: none, armigerous clan	This motto is not from the chiefly arms, but is derived from the arms of the McEwen baronets
Macfarlane			Crest: A demi-savage brandishing in his dexter hand a broad sword Proper and pointing with his sinister to an Imperial Crown Or standing by him on the Wreath. Motto: This I'll defend Plant badge: cranberry, or cloudberry	Chief: none, armigerous clan	
Macfie			Crest: A demi lion rampant Proper. Motto: Pro rege [Latin, 'For the king'] Plant badge: pine (Scots fir), oak, or crowberry	Chief: none, armigerous clan	This motto is not from the chiefly arms, but is derived from a coat of arms registered in 1864. The Macfies are one of the clans of Siol Alpin, it has been claimed that the motto was chosen in reference to Alpin father of Cináed mac Ailpín traditional first king of Scots.
Macgillivray			Crest: A cat-a-mountain sejuant guardant Proper, his dexter fore-paw on the ground, his sinister in a guardant posture and his tail reflexed under his sinister paw. Motto: Touch not this cat	Chief: none, armigerous clan Plant badge: boxwood, or red whortleberry	Part of the Clan Chattan Federation. In 2016 four Clan MacGillivary Societies of Scotland, America, Australia and the Netherlands elected Iain MacGillivray as Clan Commander
MacInnes			Crest: A sinister arm from the shoulder bendways, attired in the close sleeve of the proper tartan of Clan Aonghais, cuff flashes yellow with three buttons Or, grasping a bow vert, stringed gules. Motto: Ghift Dhe agus an righ [Scottish Gaelic, 'By the grace of God and king'] Plant badge: holly	Chief: none, armigerous clan	This motto and crest is not derived from the chiefly arms, but from a modern coat of arms belonging to William John MacInnis - an American - granted in 1961 by the Court of the Lord Lyon. Tartan for the Clan MacInnes.
MacIntyre			Crest: A dexter hand holding a dagger in pale Proper. Motto: Per ardua [Latin, 'Through difficulties'] Plant badge: common heath (Scots heather), or white Heather	Chief: Donald R. MacIntyre of Glenoe Seat: Glenoe, Argyll and Bute	
MacIver			Crest: A boar's head couped Or. Motto: Nunquam obliviscar [Latin, 'I will never forget']	Chief: none, armigerous clan	Both crest and motto are very similar to the Campbell crest badge
Mackay			Crest: A dexter arm erect couped at the elbow the hand grasping a dagger also erect all Proper. Motto: Manu forti [Latin, 'With a strong hand'] Plant badge: great bulrush, or broom	Chief: Æneas Simon Mackay, 15th Lord Reay	
Mackenzie			Crest: A mount in flames Proper. Motto: Luceo non uro [Latin, 'I shine not burn'] Plant badge: variegated holly, or deer's grass (heath club rush)	Chief: John Ruaridh Grant MacKenzie, 5th Earl of Cromartie Seat: Castle Leod, Ross-shire	The crest and motto within the crest badge are derived from that of the Macleods of Lewis. In the 17th century Mackenzie of Kintail took possession of Lewis, married a daughter of Macleod of Lewis, and added Macleod of Lewis's arms to that of his own. Even today the chiefs of Clan Mackenzie are styled Baron Macleod of Castle Leod. Innes of Learney claimed that heath club rush (deer's grass) may be confused with club moss (staghorn moss). Club moss has also been attributed to the Macraes, who were the Mackenzie's "shirt of mail". Even if it is a confusion, both deer's grass and staghorn moss likely refer to caberfeidh ('deer's antlers') in the Mackenzie chiefly arms.
McKenzie of Torry			Crest: None Motto: Vincet [Latin, 'He shall conquer']	Chieftain: Keith Ngamphon McKenzie of Torry; Seat: Torry	
Mackie			Crest: A raven Proper. Motto: Labora [Latin, 'Endeavour']	Chief: none, armigerous clan	Derived from the arms of Mackie of Larg. The Mackies of Larg were the principal branch of the clan.
Mackinnon			Crest: A boar's head erased and holding in its mouth the shank of a deer all Proper. Motto: Adentes fortuna juvat [Latin, 'Fortune assists the daring'] Plant badge: pine (Scots fir) or St John's wort (St. Columba's flower)	Chief: Madam Anne Mackinnon of Mackinnon.	
MacKinlay				Chief: none, armigerous clan	United States President William McKinley murdered 1901 was a member of this Clan
Mackintosh			Crest: A cat-a-mountain salient guardant Proper. Motto: Touch not the cat bot a glove Plant badge: red whortleberry, bearberry, or boxwood	Chief: John Lachlan Mackintosh of Mackintosh	Clan Macintosh heads the Clan Chattan Federation.
Maclachlan			Crest: (Issuant from a crest coronet of four (three visible) strawberry leaves Or) a castle set upon a rock all Proper. Motto: Fortis et fidus [Latin, 'Brave and faithful'] Plant badge: rowan (mountain ash), or lesser periwinkle	Chief: Euan Maclachlan of Maclachlan.	
Maclaine of Lochbuie			Crest: A branch of laurel and a branch of cypress in saltire surmounted of a battle axe in pale all Proper. Motto: Vincere vel mori [Latin, 'To conquer or die'] Plant badge: bilberry (blaeberry), bramble, holly, or black berry heath	Chief: Lorne MacLaine of Lochbuie	
MacLaren			Crest: A lion's head erased sable crowned with an antique crown of six (four visible) points Or, between two branches of laurel issuing from the Wreath at either side of the head both Proper. Motto: Creag an tuirc [Scottish Gaelic, 'The boar's rock'] Plant badge: laurel	Chief: Donald MacLaren of MacLaren and Achleskine	
MacLaurin	Maclaurincrest		Crest: A lady from the middle upwards ifouing out of the wreath in her arms a child both proper and habited vert Motto: Bi'se mac ant' Slaurie	Chief: none, armigerous clan	
MacLea or Livingstone			Crest: A demi-man representing the figure of Saint Moluag Proper, his head ensigned of a circle of glory Or, having about his shoulders a cloak vert, holding in his dexter hand the great Staff of Saint Moluag Proper and in his sinister hand a cross crosslet fitchée azure. Motto: Cnoc aingeil [Scottish Gaelic, 'Hill of fire']	Chief: Niall Livingstone of Bachuil	A very modern slogan which appears in the arms of the current chief. It refers to a hill on the Isle of Lismore.
Maclean			Crest: A tower embattled argent. Motto: Virtue mine honour Plant badge: crowberry or holly	Chief: Major The Hon Sir Lachlan MacLean of Duart and Morvern, Bt.	
MacLellan			Crest: A naked arm supporting on the point of a sword, a moor's head. Motto: Think on	Chief: none, armigerous clan	Lord Kirkcudbright's crest alludes to the tradition that a MacLellan killed an Irish bandit which had terrorised the lands around Kirkcudbright. The king offered anyone who brought the bandit in, dead or alive, the barony of Bomby. When the king appeared to forget his promise, MacLellan supposedly exclaimed "Think on!". See Black Morrow for more info.
MacLennan			Crest: A demi-piper all Proper, garbed in the proper tartan of the Clan Maclennan. Motto: Dum spiro spero [Latin, 'While I breathe I hope'] Plant badge: furze	Chief: Ruairidh MacLennan of MacLennan	
Macleod			Crest: A bull's head cabossed sable, horned Or, between two flags gules, staved at the First. Motto: Hold fast Plant badge: juniper	Chief: Hugh Magnus MacLeod of MacLeod Seat: Dunvegan Castle, Isle of Skye	
Macleod of the Lewes			Crest: The sun in splendor, Proper. Motto: I birn quhil I se Plant badge: red whortleberry	Chief: Torquil MacLeod of the Lewes	
MacMillan			Crest: A dexter and a sinister hand issuing from a Wreath grasping and brandishing aloft a two-handed sword Proper. Motto: Miseris succurrere disco [Latin, 'I learn to succour the unfortunate'] Plant badge: holly	Chief: George MacMillan of Macmillan and Knap	
Macnab			Crest: The head of a savage affrontée proper. Motto: Timor ommis abesto [Latin, 'Let fear be far from all'] Plant badge: stone bramble, or common heath (Scots heather)	Chief: James Macnab of Macnab	
Macnaghten			Crest: A tower embattled gules. Motto: I hoip in God; Plant badge: trailing azalea	Chief: Sir Patrick Macnaghten of Macnaghten, Bt.	Tartan of MacNaughton
MacNeacail			Crest: A hawk's head erased gules. Motto: Sgorr-a-bhreac [Scottish Gaelic, 'Scorrybreac', castle of the clan chiefs]	Chief: John MacNeacail of MacNeacail and Scorrybreac	
MacNeil			Crest: On a chapeau gules furred ermine, a rock Proper. Motto: Buaidh no bas [Scottish Gaelic, 'To conquer or die'] Plant badge: dryas, or trefoil	Chief: Ian R. MacNeil of Barra	The clan badge may actually be attributed to the McNeills of Gigha, a branch of Clan MacNeil. Trefoil has also been attributed to the Lamonts, another clan in Argyl. The Lamonts and MacNeils/McNeills both claim descent from the same O'Neill who settled in Scotland in the Middle Ages.
Macphail			Crest: A stag's head erased Proper Motto: Memor esto [Latin, 'Be mindful'] Plant badge: red whortelberry	Chief: none, armigerous clan	Of the old blood of the Clan Chattan Federation. MacPhails today however can be found with Clan Macintosh in the East or with Clan Cameron in the west.
Macpherson			Crest: A cat sejant Proper. Motto: 'Touch no the cat but a glove' Plant badge: white heather, boxwood, or red whortleberry	Chief: Sir William Macpherson of Cluny	Of the old blood of the Clan Chattan Federation.
Macquarrie			Plant badge: pine (Scots fir)	Chief: none, armigerous clan	
Macqueen			Crest: An heraldic tyger rampant ermine holding an arrow, point downwards argent pheoned gules. Motto: Constant and faithful Plant badge: boxwood, or red whortleberry	Chief: none, armigerous clan	Part of the Clan Chattan Federation. The chief's family is believed to have moved to New Zealand and the clan became scattered throughout Scotland and the rest of the English-speaking world.
Macrae			Crest: A cubit arm grasping a sword all Proper. Motto: Fortitudine [Latin, 'With fortitude'] Plant badge: club moss	Chief: none, armigerous clan	Club moss sometimes referred to as staghorn grass, may refer to the Mackenzie chiefly arms, or at least the Macrae's close association with the Mackenzies.
MacTavish			Crest: A boar's head erased Or langued Proper. Motto: Non oblitus [Latin, 'Not Forgotten'] Plant badge: The Jacobite Rose (White Rose)	Chief: Steven Edward Dugald MacTavish of Dunardry, 27th Hereditary Chief of Clan MacTavish	Clan MacTavish is recorded among the original clans of Scotland, with the chiefly title Mac Tamhais Mor reflecting the clan's ancient Gaelic Highland origins in Knapdale, Argyll, documented since approximately 893 AD — more than three centuries before the first recorded Campbell presence in Argyll.
MacThomas			Crest: A demi-cat-a-mountain rampant guardant Proper, grasping in his dexter paw a serpent vert, langued gules, its tail environing the sinister paw. Motto: Deo juvante invidiam superabo [Latin, 'I Will Overcome Envy with God's Help']	Chief: Andrew MacThomas of Finegand	
Maitland			Crest: A lion sejant affrontée gules, ducally crowned Proper, in his dexter paw a sword Proper hilted and pommelled Or, in his sinister a fleur de lis azure. Motto: Consilio et animis [Latin, 'By wisdom and courage']	Chief: Ian Maitland, 18th Earl of Lauderdale	
Makgill			Crest: A phoenix in flames Proper. Motto: Sine fine [Latin, 'Without end']	Chief: Ian Arthur Alexander Makgill, 14th Viscount of Oxfuird	
Malcolm (MacCallum)			Crest: A tower argent, window and port azure. Motto: In ardua tendit [Latin, 'He has attempted difficult things'] Plant badge: rowan berries	Chief: Iain Malcolm, 20th Laird of Poltalloch	
Mar			Crest: On a chapeau gules furred ermine, two wings, each of ten pen feathers, erected and addorsed, both blazoned as in the arms. Motto: Pans plus [French, 'Thinks more']	Chief: Margaret of Mar, 31st Countess of Mar	
Marjoribanks			Crest: A demi-griffin Proper, issuant from a crest coronet Or. Motto: Et custos et pugnax [Latin, 'Both a preserver and a champion']	Chief: Andrew George Marjoribanks of that Ilk	
Masterton				Chief: none, armigerous clan	
Matheson			Crest: Issuant from an antique crown Or, a hand brandishing a scimitar fessways all Proper. Motto: Fac et spera [Latin, 'Do and hope'] Plant badge: broom, or holly	Chief: Fergus John Matheson of Matheson, 7th Bt.	
Maule				Chief: none, armigerous clan	
Maxton				Chief: none, armigerous clan	
Maxwell			Crest: A stag Proper, attired argent, couchant before a Holly bush proper. Motto: Reviresco [Latin, 'I grow strong again']	Chief: none, armigerous clan	
McCorquodale			Crest: A stag at gaze Proper attired gules. Motto: Vivat rex [Latin, 'Long live the king']	Chief: none, armigerous clan	
McCulloch			Crest: A hand throwing a dart Proper Motto: Vi et animo [Latin, "By strength and courage']	Chief: none, armigerous clan	
McKerrell				Chief: none, armigerous clan	
McRitchie			Motto: Virtutue acquiritur honos [Latin, 'Honour is acquired by virtue']	Chief: none, armigerous clan	
Meldrum				Chief: none, armigerous clan	
Melville			Crest: A ratch hound's head erased Proper, collared gules. Motto: Denique coelum [Latin, 'Heaven at last']	Chief: none, armigerous clan	
Menzies			Crest: A savage head erased Proper. Motto: Vil God I sal Plant badge: Menzies' heath	Chief: Robert Ronald Menzies of Menzies	
Mercer				Chief: none, armigerous clan	
Middleton			Crest: Issuing out of a tower sable, a lion rampant gules, armed and langued azure. Motto: Fortis in ardus [Latin, 'Brave in difficulty']	Chief: none, armigerous clan	
Moffat			Crest: A crest coronet and issuing therefrom a cross crosslet fitchée sable surmounted of a saltire argent. Motto: Spero meliora [Latin, 'I aspire to greater things']	Chief: Jean Moffat of that Ilk	
Moncreiffe			Crest: Issuing from a crest coronet Or, a demi-lion rampant gules, armed and langued azure. Motto: Sur esperance [Middle French, 'Upon hope'] Plant badge: oak	Chief: Peregrine Moncreiffe of that Ilk	Oak-leaves appear on a stone carving of the 12th laird's heraldic mantling of 1634.
Moncur				Chief: none, armigerous clan	
Monteith				Chief: none, armigerous clan	
Montgomery			Crest: A lady dressed in ancient apparel azure holding in her dexter hand an anchor and in her sinister hand the head of a savage couped suspended by the hair all Proper. Motto: Garde bien [French, 'Watch well']	Chief: Hugh Archibald William Montgomerie, 19th Earl of Eglinton and 7th Earl of Winton	
Monypenny			Crest: A figure representing Neptune, namely a naked man, bearded Proper, crowned with an antique crown vert, bestriding a dolphin naiant Or, finned gules, in waves of the sea argent and azure, holding in his sinister hand, bridling the dolphin gules, and in his dexter hand a trident azure. Motto: Imperat aequor [Latin, 'He rules the sea']	Chief: none, armigerous clan Seat: Pitmilly, Fife	
Morrison			Crest: Issuant from waves of the sea azure crested argent, a mount vert, thereon a battlemented wall azure masoned argent, and issuing therefrom a cubit arm naked Proper, the hand grasping a dagger hilted Or. Motto: Teaghlach phabbay [Scottish Gaelic, 'Pabbay family'] Plant badge: driftwood	Chief: R. Alasdair Morrison of Ruchdi	This motto refers to the chief's descent from the Morrisons of North Uist and Harris, rather than from the Morrisons of Lewis. The Morrisons of North Uist and Harris are not traditionally thought to be related to the Morrisons of Lewis.
Mouat				Chief: none, armigerous clan	
Moubray				Chief: none, armigerous clan	
Mow			Crest: A phoenix rising out of the flames Proper. Motto: Post funera faenus [Latin, 'An interest after death']	Chief: none, armigerous clan	
Muir			Motto: Durum patientia frango	Chief: none, armigerous clan	
Muirhead			Crest: The sword of Willielmo De Muirhead, 1st Laird of Muirhead, used to execute Bertram de Shotts Motto: Auxilio Dei [Latin, 'With the help of God']	Chief: none, armigerous clan	
Munro			Crest: An eagle perching Proper. Motto: Dread God; Plant badge: common club moss	Chief: Hector W. Munro of Foulis Seat: Foulis Castle, Ross-shire	
Murray			Crest: On a Wreath Or and sable a demi-savage Proper wreathed about the temples and waist with laurel, his arms extended and holding in the right hand a dagger, in the left a key all Proper. Motto: Furth fortune and fill the fetters Plant badge: butcher's broom, or juniper	Chief: Bruce Murray, 12th Duke of Atholl	
Murray of Atholl			Motto: Tout prest		
Nairn			Crest: A celestial globe on a stand Proper Motto: Plus ultra [Latin, 'More beyond this']	Chief: none, armigerous clan Seat: Nairn, Nairnshire	
Napier			Crest: A dexter arm erect couped below the elbow Proper, grasping a crescent argent. Motto: Sans tache [French, 'Without stain']	Chief: Francis Nigel Napier, 14th Lord Napier	
Nesbitt			Crest: A boar passant sable, armed argent and langued gules. Motto: I byd it	Chief: Mark Nesbitt of that Ilk	
Nevoy			CREST: A pegasus Proper. MOTTO: Marte et arte (By strength and by art)	Chief: none, armigerous clan	
Newlands			Motto: Honour the spur	Chief: none, armigerous clan	The crest badge is not derived from the chiefly arms, but from a recently granted coat of arms.
Newton				Chief: none, armigerous clan	
Nicolson			Crest: A lion issuant Or armed and langued gules. Motto: Generositate [Latin, 'By generosity'] Plant badge: juniper	Chief: vacant	
Norvel				Chief: none, armigerous clan	
Ochterlony				Chief: none, armigerous clan	
Ogilvy			Crest: A lady affrontée from the middle upward Proper in azure vestments richly attired holding a portcullis gules. Motto: À fin [Middle French, 'To the end'] Plant badge: whitethorn, hawthorn, or evergreen alkanet	Chief: David George Patrick Coke Ogilvy, 8th Earl of Airlie	
Oliphant			Crest: A unicorn's head couped argent armed and manned Or. Motto: Tout pourvoir [French, 'Provide for all'] Plant badge: bulrush	Chief: Richard Oliphant of that Ilk	
Orrock				Chief: none, armigerous clan	
Paisley			Crest: A dexter arm from the shoulder in armour grasping a dagger all Proper Motto: Be sure	Chief: none, armigerous clan	
Paterson			Crest: A dexter hand issuing out of a cloud holding a branch of laurel, all Proper Motto: Huc tendimus omnes [Latin, 'We all strive for this']	Chief: none, armigerous clan	
Patullo				Chief: none, armigerous clan	
Pennycook				Chief: none, armigerous clan	
Pentland				Chief: none, armigerous clan	
Peter				Chief: none, armigerous clan	
Pitblado				Chief: none, armigerous clan	
Pitcairn				Chief: none, armigerous clan	
Pollock			Crest: A boar passant shot through with a dart Proper. Motto: Audacter et strenue [Latin, 'Boldly and readily', 'Boldly and Strongly']	Chief: none, armigerous clan	
Polwarth				Chief: none, armigerous clan	
Porterfield				Chief: none, armigerous clan	
Preston			Crest: An angel Proper Motto: Praesto ut praestem [Latin, 'I undertake what I may perform']	Chief: none, armigerous clan	
Primrose			Crest: A demi-lion rampant gules holding in his dexter paw a primrose Or. Motto: Fide et fiducia [Latin, 'By faith and trust', 'By faith and confidence']	Chief: Neil Primrose, 7th Earl of Rosebery	
Pringle			Crest: An escallop Or. Motto: Amicitia reddit honores	Chief: Sir Norman Murray Archibald MacGregor Pringle of that Ilk and Stichill, 10th Baronet	
Purves				Chief: none, armigerous clan	
Rait			CREST: An anchor Proper MOTTO: Spero meliora (I hope for better things)	Chief: none, armigerous clan	
Ralston			Crest: A Falcon Proper Motto: Fide et marte [Latin, 'With fidelity and bravery', 'Faithful and warlike']	Chief: none, armigerous clan Historic Seats: Ralston, Renfrewshire; Beith, Ayrshire	
Ramsay			Crest: A unicorn's head couped argent armed Or. Motto: Ora et labora [Latin, 'Pray and labour'] Plant badge: blue harebell	Chief: James Hubert Ramsay, 17th Earl of Dalhousie	
Rattray			Crest: Issuant from a crest coronet Or, a star Or and thereon a flaming heart Proper. Motto: Super sidera votum [Latin, 'My wishes are above the stars']	Chief: Lachlan Rattray	
Renton				Chief: none, armigerous clan	
Riddell			Crest: A demi greyhound Proper. Motto: I hope to share	Chief: Sir John Riddell of that Ilk, Bt.	
Robertson			Motto: Virtutis gloria merces [Latin, 'Glory is the reward of valour']	Chief: Gilbert Robertson of Struan	
Rollo			Crest: A stag's head couped Proper. Motto: La fortune passe partout [French, 'Fortune passes over everywhere']	Chief: David Eric Howard Rollo, 14th Lord Rollo	
Rose			Crest: On a chapeau gules furred ermine, a harp azure. Motto: Constant and true Plant badge: wild rosemary	Chief: Anna Elizabeth Guillemard Rose of Kilravock	
Ross			A hand holding a garland of juniper Proper. Motto: Spem successus alit [Latin, 'Success nourishes hope'] Plant badge: juniper, or bearberry	Chief: David Campbell Ross of Ross and Balnagowan	The 19th-century historian W. F. Skene listed this clan's badge as uva ursi, which is sometimes known as bearberry.
Rossie				Chief: none, armigerous clan	
Routledge				Chief: none, armigerous clan	
Russell			Crest: A dexter hand holding a skene dubh and on the point thereof a pair of balances, all Proper. Motto: Virtus sine macula [Latin, 'Virtue without stain']	Chief: none, armigerous clan Aden in Aberdeenshire.	
Rutherford			Motto: Nec sorte nec fato [Latin, 'Neither by chance nor by fate']	Chief: none, armigerous clan	
Ruthven			Crest: A ram's head couped sable armed Or. Motto: Deid schaw	Chief: Alexander Patrick Greysteil Ruthven, 2nd Earl of Gowrie	
Sandilands			Motto: Spero meliora [Latin, 'I hope for better things']	Chief: The Rt Hon. the Lord Torphichen	
Schaw				Chief: none, armigerous clan	
Scott			Crest: A stag trippant Proper, attired and unguled Or. Motto: Amo [Latin, 'I love']	Chief: Richard Walter John Montagu-Douglas-Scott, 10th Duke of Buccleuch 12th Duke of Queensberry	
Scrymgeour			Crest: A lion's paw erased in bend Or holding a crooked sword or scymitar argent. Motto: Dissipate [Latin, 'Disperse']	Chief: Alexander Henry Scrymgeour of Dundee, 12th Earl of Dundee	
Sempill			Crest: A stag's head argent attired with ten tynes azure and collared with a prince's crown Or. Motto: Keep tryst	Chief: James William Stuart Whitmore Sempill, 21s^{t} Lord Sempill	
Seton			Crest: On a ducal coronet, a dragon vert, spouting fire Proper, with wings elevated and charged with a star argent Motto: Hazard yet forward on Plant badge: yew	Chief: none, armigerous clan Seat: Seton Palace, East Lothian	The chiefs of Seton were the Lords Seton and Earls of Winton (first creation), whose titles and estates were confiscated due to their support of the Jacobite rising of 1715.
Shaw of Tordarroch			Crest: A dexter cubit arm couped and holding a dagger erect and all Proper. Motto: Fide et fortitudine [Latin, 'By faith and fortitude']	Chief: Iain Shaw of Tordarroch	Part the Clan Chattan Federation through its association with Clan Mackintosh.
Sinclair			Crest: A cock Proper, armed and beaked Or. Motto: Commit thy work to God; Plant badge: furze (whin), or white clover	Chief: Malcolm Ian Sinclair, 20th Earl of Caithness	
Skene			Crest: A dexter arm issuing from the shoulder out of a cloud, holding forth in the hand a triumphal crown, Proper. Motto: Virtutis regia merces [Latin, 'A palace the reward of bravery']	Chief: Danus Skene of Skene	
Skirving				Chief: none, armigerous clan	
Somerville			Crest: A dragon, vert, spouting fire, Proper, standing on a wheel, argent Motto: Fear god in life	Chief: none, armigerous clan	
Spalding				Chief: none, armigerous clan	
Spens			Crest: A hart's head erased Proper. Motto: Si Deus quis contra [Latin, 'If God is for us, who is against us']	Chief: Patrick Spens, 4th Baron Spens	The Spens heir has not yet contacted the Lord Lyon or the Standing Council of Scottish Chiefs
Spottiswood			Crest: An eagle rising Proper looking at the sun in his splendour Or Motto: Patior ut potiar [Latin, 'I suffer that I may obtain']	Chief: none, armigerous clan Seat: Spottiswood, Gordon, Berwickshire	
Stewart			Crest: A pelican argent, winged Or, in her nest feeding her young, Proper. Motto: Virecit vulnere virtus [Latin, 'Courage grows strong at a wound'] Plant badge: oak, or thistle	Chief: none, armigerous clan	
Stewart of Appin				Chief: none, armigerous clan	
Stirling			Crest: Issuing out of an antique coronet Or a hart's head couped azure. Motto: Gang forward [Scots, 'Going forward']	Chief: Francis John Stirling of Cadder	
Strachan			Crest: A demi stag springing Or holding a thistle in his mouth Proper. Motto: Non timeo sed caveo [Latin, 'I do not fear but am careful']	Chief: none, armigerous clan	
Straiton				Chief: none, armigerous clan	
Strange				Chief: Timothy Strange of Balcaskie	
Stuart of Bute			Crest: A demi-lion rampant gules, armed and langued azure. Motto: Nobilis est ira leonis [Latin, 'The lion's anger is noble']	Chief: The Most Hon. John Crichton-Stuart, 7th Marquess of Bute	
Sutherland			Crest: A cat-a-mountain sejant rampant Proper. Motto: Sans peur [French, 'Without fear'] Plant badge: cotton sedge	Chief: Alistair Charles St Clair Sutherland, 25th Earl of Sutherland	
Swinton			Crest: A boar chained to a tree Proper. Motto: J'espere [French, 'I hope']	Chief: John Walter Swinton of that Ilk	
Sydserf			Crest: An eagle's head couped gules. Motto: Virtute promoreo [Latin, 'By virtue I prevail']	Chief: none, armigerous clan Seat: Ruchlaw estate (see Stenton), East Lothian	
Symmers				Chief: none, armigerous clan Seat: Baljordie, Angus	
Tailyour			Crest: A hand holding a passion cross gules. Motto: In cruce salus [Latin, 'Salvation from the cross']	Chief: none, armigerous clan	
Tait				Chief: none, armigerous clan Seat: Pirn, Tweeddale	
Tennant				Chief: none, armigerous clan	
Trotter			Crest: A knight in armour Proper, holding his courser argent caparisoned gules. Motto: In promptu [Latin, 'In readiness']	Chief: Alexander Trotter of Mortonhall	
Troup			Crest: A hind's head erased Proper Motto: Veritas vincit [Latin, 'Truth conquers']	Chief: none, armigerous clan	
Turnbull			Crest: A bull's head. Motto: I saved the king	Chief: none, armigerous clan	
Tweedie			Crest: A bull's head. Motto: Thol and think	Chief: none, armigerous clan	This crest badge is derived from the arms of Tweedie of Drumelzier.
Udny			Crest: A fleur de lis gules Motto: All my hope is in God	Chief: none, armigerous clan Seat: Udny Castle, Aberdeenshire	
Urquhart			Crest: Issuant from a crest coronet Or, a naked woman from the waist upwards Proper, brandishing in her desxter hand a sword azure, hilted and pommelled gules, and holding in her sinister hand a palm sapling vert. Motto: Mean weil speak weil and doe weil Plant badge: wallflower, or gillyflower	Chief: Wilkins Fisk Urquhart of Urquhart	
Vans			Crest: On a chapeau azure furred ermine a lion rampant Proper holding in his paws a balance gules Motto: Be faithful	Chief: none, armigerous clan Seat: Dirleton Castle, East Lothian	The Chiefly line was originally "de Vaus of Dirleton", but changed to "Vans of Barnbarroch" after the loss of Dirleton
Walkinshaw			Crest: A martlet. Motto: In season	Chief: none, armigerous clan	
Wallace			Crest: Issuant from a crest coronet of four (three visible) strawberry leaves Or, a dexter arm vambraced, the hand brandishing a sword all Proper. Motto: Pro libertate [Latin, 'For liberty']	Chief: Ian Francis Wallace of that Ilk	
Wardlaw			Crest: A celestial star Or Motto: Familias firmat pietas [Latin, 'Religion strengthens families']	Chief: none, armigerous clan Seat: Torry, Fife	
Watson			Crest: Two hands holding the trunk of an oak tree sprouting the hands issuing out of clouds Motto: Insperata floruit [Latin, 'Unexpectedly flourished']	Chief: none, armigerous clan Historic Seat: Saughton, Edinburgh	
Wauchope			Crest: A garb Proper Motto: Industria ditat [Latin, 'Industry enriches']	Chief: none, armigerous clan	
Wedderburn			Crest: An eagle's head erased Proper. Motto: Non degener [Latin, 'Not degenerate', 'Not Unworthy']	Chief: Henry David Wedderburn of that Ilk, Lord Scrymgeour, Master of Dundee	
Weir			Crest: Upon a chapeau gules furred ermine a boar statant azure armed Or. Motto: Vero nihil verius [Latin, 'Nothing truer than truth']	Chief: none, armigerous clan	Crest badge derived from the arms of Weir of Blackwood.
Wemyss			Crest: A swan Proper. Motto: Je pense [French, 'I think']	Chief: David Wemyss of that Ilk	
Whitefoord			Crest: A garb Or standing upright and thereon a dove Proper Motto: Tout est d'en haut [French, 'All is from above']	Chief: none, armigerous clan	
Whitelaw			Crest: A crescent. Motto: Gradatim plena	Chief: none, armigerous clan	
Wishart			Crest: A demi eagle with wings expanded Proper Motto: Mercy is my desire	Chief: none, armigerous clan	
Wood			Crest: A ship under sail Proper. Motto: Tutus in undis [Latin, 'Safe on the waves'] Plant badge: oak	Chief: Oonagh Elizabeth Susan Fawcett Wood of Largo.	The Arms are those of Sir Andrew Wood of Largo, who is considered the founder of the present chiefly line.
Young			Crest: A demi lion issuant gules, holding a sword Proper Motto: Robore prudentia præstat [Latin, 'Prudence excels strength']	Chief: none, armigerous clan	

== See also ==
- List of ancient Celtic peoples and tribes
- List of Irish clans
- List of tartans § Scottish clan tartans
- Scottish clan

== Bibliography ==
- Adam, Frank (1970) [1908]. Innes of Learney, Thomas (ed.). The Clans, Septs & Regiments of the Scottish Highlands (8th ed.). Edinburgh: Johnston and Bacon.
- Innes of Learney, Thomas (1956). Scots Heraldry (2nd ed.). London: Oliver and Boyd.
- Bain, Robert; Stewart-Blacker, P. E. (1983). MacDougall, Margaret O. (ed.). The Clans and Tartans of Scotland. London: Fontana. ISBN 0-00-411117-6.
- Campbell of Airds, Alastair (2000). A History of Clan Campbell. Vol. 1: From Origins to the Battle of Flodden. Edinburgh University Press. ISBN 1-902930-17-7.
- Moncreiffe of that Ilk, Iain (1967). The Highland Clans. London: Barrie & Rockliff.
- Pine, Leslie Gilbert (1983). A Dictionary of Mottoes. Routledge. ISBN 0-7100-9339-X.
- Stone, Jon R. (2005). The Routledge Dictionary of Latin Quotations. Routledge. ISBN 0-415-96908-5.
- Way of Plean, George; Squire, Romilly (1994). Scottish Clan and Family Encyclopaedia.
- Way of Plean, George; Squire, Romilly (2000). Clans & Tartans. Glasgow: HarperCollins. ISBN 0-00-472501-8.
