= Clan Kinninmont =

Scottish clan

Crest badge suitable for members of Clan Kinninmont.

Arms of the Kininmont of that Ilk, chief of Clan Kinninmont.

Clan Kinninmont is a Scottish clan. The clan does not have a chief recognised by the Lord Lyon King of Arms, therefore the clan has no standing under Scots Law. Clan Kinninmont is considered an armigerous clan, meaning that it is considered to have had at one time a chief who possessed the chiefly arms, however no one at present is in possession of such arms. The original chiefly line died out when an heiress married into another family. The successors of this heiress are the Earls of Minto.

== History ==
The clan name Kinninmont is derived from the lands of Kinninmonth in Fife, Scotland. In the years between 1189 and 1199, Odo, seneschal to the Bishop of St Andrews, received a charter for these lands from William I of Scotland. An 1841 publication dealing with the charters on the archbishopric of St Andrews states that the charter granted by John, son of Adam, son of Odo is not recorded. The publication also states that John's "original deed of consent, executed at the same time, and before the same witnesses with the charter of his father, is still extanct; and on his seal we find the family name for the first time: S’Iohannis de Kinimmund". William de Kynemuthe's name appears on the Ragman Roll, which records the names of Scots nobles who submitted to Edward I of England in 1296. In 1329 Alexander de Kininmund became Bishop of Aberdeen. Another Alexander de Kininmund became Archdeacon of Aberdeen in 1352. James Kynimond of that Ilk asserted his hereditary right to the offices of baillie, steward and marischal of St Andrews, in 1438. The direct line of Kininmonts of that Ilk (the chiefly line) came to an end with the marriage of the one heiress to Murray of Melgund.

== Clan symbols ==
The crest badge suitable for members of the clan is derived from the arms of Kinninmont of that Ilk. The crest is blazoned as an oak tree Vert and the motto is STABO, meaning "i shall stand".

The arms are marshalled within those of Elliot-Murray-Kynynmound, Earls of Minto.

== See also ==
- Scottish clan
