= Clan Craig =

Scottish clan

arms of the last chief of clan Craig, The Craig of Riccarton.

Clan Craig is a Scottish clan hailing from Aberdeenshire. The clan does not have a chief recognized by the Lord Lyon King of Arms, therefore the clan has no standing under Scots Law. Clan Craig is considered an armigerous clan, meaning that it is considered to have had at one time a chief who possessed the chiefly arms, however no one at present is in possession of such arms.

Per the Lord Lyon King of Arms, no clan society, association or organization is recognised as an "official Representor" of an Armigerous Clan. Armigerous clans have no official Representor, as they do not have a Chief or Commander recognized by the Lord Lyon King of Arms. The only official Representor of a Scottish Clan is the Chief or Commander officially recognized in their letters patent, or more common when a Warrant has been issued by the Court of the Lord Lyon. The Clan Craig Association of America (and other clan Craig organisations), however, are an important clansman charged with business matters of the clan. The primary responsibility of all Armigerous Clan societies and associations is to find a chief or commander and bring legitimacy and honour back to their family name. [Ref. Adam/Innes. "Clans, Sept & Regiment of the Scottish Highlands"]

The Scottish surname Craig is derived from the Gaelic creag meaning "rocky hill". The surname is a topographic name for a person who lived near a steep rock, and often prefixed to the names of places in hilly or mountainous districts in various parts of Scotland. The name seems to belong particularly to the north of Scotland.

John of the Craig (Johannes Del Crag) of Aberdeenshire led a party of 300 men into the Battle of Culblean in 1335. It is believed that John of the Craig was Laird of the Craig of Auchindoir - the estate next to the Den of Craig in the Parish of Auchindoir. According to George Fraser Black, during the 15th century there were three families that styled themselves "of that Ilk" (meaning that the name of the family is the same as that of the place they come from i.e. Craig of Craig). The Craigs of Craigfintry - later Riccarton - became the most noted family.

Thomas Craig of Riccarton 1538–1608, lawyer and writer, was descended from William Craig of Craigfintry (later Craigston) in Aberdeenshire, who was born in the last half of the 15th century. William Craig's second son (also named William Craig of Craigfintry) fought against the English at the Battle of Flodden in 1513, where he was slain. The last lineal descendant of the Craigs of Riccarton was Robert Craig of Riccarton who died in 1823 leaving no heirs. The estate of Riccarton passed to Mr. James Gibson who assumed the name and arms of Craig, changing his name to James Gibson-Craig.

Members of Clan Craig may wear a crest badge containing the crest of a chevalier on horseback in full charge grasping a broken lance in bend Proper, and the Latin motto VIVE DEO ET VIVES meaning "live for God and you shall have life". The heraldry within the crest badge is taken from the arms of Craig of Riccarton.
