= Clan Middleton =

Scottish clan

- Crest: Issuing out of a tower Sable, a lion rampant Gules, armed and langued Azure.
- Motto: FORTIS IN ARDUS ("Brave in difficulty")

Profile
- District: Laurencekirk, Kincardineshire
- Clan Middleton no longer has a chief, and is an armigerous clan
- Historic seat: Fettercairn House

Clan Middleton is a Lowland Scottish clan. It is recognised as such by the Court of the Lord Lyon, but as it does not currently have a chief recognised by the Lord Lyon King of Arms it is considered an armigerous clan.

== History ==
=== Origins of the clan ===
The early history of Clan Middleton is described in detail in the 17th century work of Frederic van Bossen, who claimed that the first Lord of Middleton was Freskin, the brother of Kenneth de Cunninghame; and the son of Kenneth and Lady Sponsa, who was the sister of Albinack ap Crinain. Freskin's name was an assumed name, and he was christened at birth with the name Malcolm. He was a direct descendant (the great-grandson) of Prince Malcom of Cumberland (Strathclyde). Though it is claimed by van Bossen that his great-great-grandfather was King Duffus, a careful review of Frederic van Bossen's notes refutes this and argues that the father of Prince Malcolm is more likely to be King Dyfnwal of Strathclyde. In these records an extended family line with the names of both spouses is provided for all five generations, except for the name of Freskin de Middleton's de Fettercairn's brother, Kenneth.

Although there are multiple lands in Scotland that are named Middleton, it is believed that the family took its name from those near to Laurencekirk in Kincardineshire. This agrees with Clan Cunningham records, which show a Robert de Cunningham held land in the region of Laurencekirk in the late 12th century. These lands were confirmed by a charter from William the Lion (c. 1142 – 4 December 1214). In 1296, Humfrey de Middleton of Kincardyn appeared on the Ragman Rolls rendering homage to Edward I of England. Robert de Middleton was taken prisoner at Dunbar Castle in the same year.

=== 17th century ===
The Middleton family came to prominence in the 17th century. John Middleton, son of Middleton of Caldhame, was a professional soldier who served the king of France, in Hepburn's Regiment. In 1642 he returned to Scotland and supported the opponents of Charles I of England. Firstly, as a cavalry commander and later as a general. Middleton was with David Leslie, 1st Lord Newark's cavalry when they surprised and defeated James Graham, 1st Marquess of Montrose at the Battle of Philiphaugh in 1645, pursuing him northwards. Middleton also negotiated the terms when Charles I surrendered for Montrose to take ship to the Continent. Middleton later joined forces with James Hamilton, 1st Duke of Hamilton in an attempt to rescue the king in 1648, but was taken prisoner after the Battle of Preston. He later escaped and re-joined the royalists only to be wounded and captured again at the Battle of Worcester in 1651. He was tried for treason, but again escaped and joined Glencairn's rising, only to be defeated by George Monck, 1st Duke of Albemarle, and went into exile again on the Continent. At The Restoration, Charles II of England created him Earl of Middleton as well as Lord Clermont and Fettercarin. He was later also created Lord High Commissioner to the Parliament of Scotland and Governor of Tangier in 1667, where he died.

John Middleton's only son was Charles, the second and last Earl of Middleton who was ambassador to the imperial court of Vienna and Secretary of State for Scotland. Charles did not approve of the actions of James II of England and VII of Scotland, but did not support the Glorious Revolution of 1688 or the subsequent ascension of Queen Mary and William of Orange, fleeing to France. His sons were captured attempting an invasion of Scotland with French troops and were subsequently sent to the Tower of London, but later released. The title was then forfeited and never restored.

=== 20th century ===
Sir Thomas Middleton of Rosefarm was a distinguished agriculturalist and deputy director general of the Department of Food Production during World War I. He was made a Fellow of the Royal Society in 1936.

== Castles ==
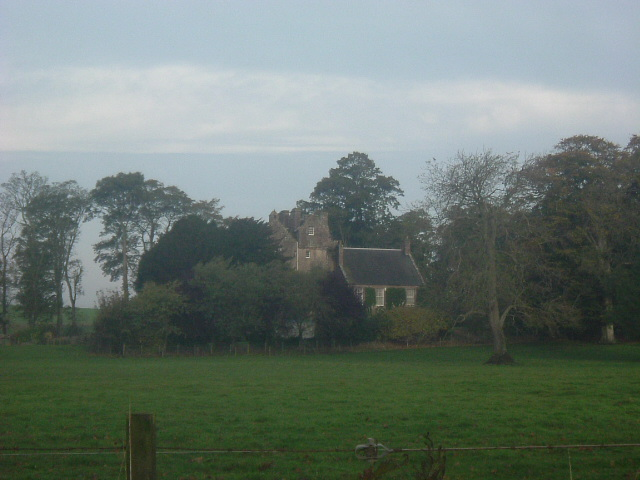
Balbengo Castle

Castles that have been owned by the Clan Middleton have included:

- Fettercairn House, previously known as Middleton, half a mile north-east of the village of Fettercairn. Originally there was a castle but it was replaced in 1666 by Fettercairn House which has been extended over the centuries and has a Jacobean front. This was the seat of the Middletons from the 12th century. After the family were forfeited for supporting the Jacobite rising of 1715 it passed to the Belshes, then to the Forbeses of Pitsligo and then to Lord Clinton.
- Balbengo Castle, just to the south of Fettercairn was an L-plan tower house dating from the 16th century, but replaced by a mansion two centuries later. It was long held by the Clan Wood, but was sold to the Middletons in 1687. It later passed to the Clan Ogilvy and then to the Clan Ramsay.
- Pitgarvie, about three miles south and west of Laurencekirk was held by the Middletons at the end of the 17th century. There was a castle or old house, but the site is now probably occupied by a farm.
