= Clan Russell =

Scottish clan

- Ruiseal
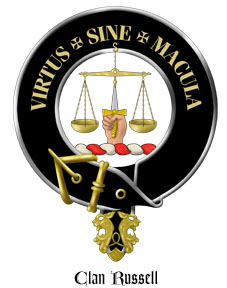
- Crest: A dexter hand holding a skene dubh and on the point thereof a pair of balances, all Proper.
- Motto: Virtus sine macula. (Virtue without a stain)

Profile
- Region: Lowlands and Highlands
- District: Perth and Kinross, Clackmannanshire and Aberdeenshire
- Clan Russell no longer has a chief, and is an armigerous clan
- Historic seat: Aden in Aberdeenshire, various other locations in Scotland
- Last Chief: Baron Rozel

Clan Russell is a Scottish armigerous clan, with claimed origins in Normandy. It has ancestral ties to the English Dukes of Bedford, and has numerous descendants in Great Britain and America.

== History ==
=== Origins of the clan ===
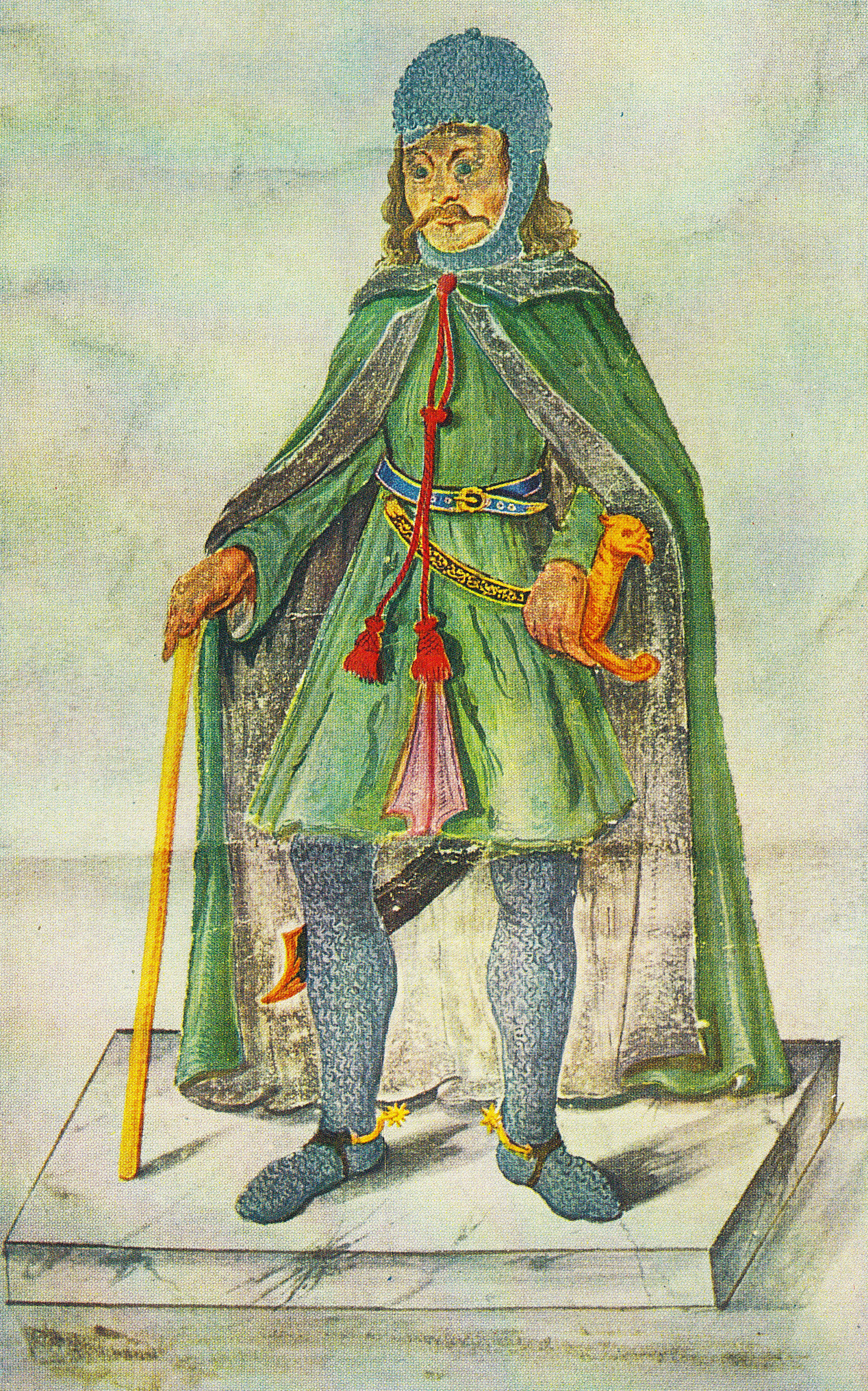
Hugh de Rosel, the legendary and probably fictitious Norman ancestor of Clan Russell. Drawn by Le Neve, York Herald, in 1626. Woburn Abbey collection.

Scottish author George F. Black believed the surname Russell may be derived from roux which means red. Other writers claim it to be derived from the Norman place name de Rosel. The name Rufus was commonly found among the Anglo-Normans (from Le Roux a nickname for someone with red hair). Between 1164 and 1177 Walter Russel witnessed a charter in favour of Paisley Abbey. Mentioned in a charter of about 1180 is John, son of Robert Russell of Duncanlaw. In 1259 Robert Russell witnessed a deed relating to the lands of Threipland.

==== Wars of Scottish Independence ====
In 1296 Robert Russell appears on the Ragman Rolls giving homage to Edward I of England. Historian William Anderson stated that the name of Russell came to Aberdeenshire with one Rozel who was an English baron who fought at the siege of Berwick and the Battle of Halidon Hill in 1333. Rozel subsequently settled in Scotland and obtained the estate of Aden. His family was styled 'Russell of that Ilk'.

=== 17th, 18th and 19th centuries ===
Patrick Russell was married to a sister of Archbishop Sharp and in 1680 he purchased the lands of Moncoffer in Banffshire. From him descend the Scottish Barons of Aden, Aberdeenshire.

The Russell of Ashiesteel family in Selkirkshire were particularly distinguished in military service. Between 1756 and 1767 Colonel William Russel of Ashiesteel was adjutant general of the army of Madras and served under General Lord Clive. His son was Major General Sir James Russel who also served in India and commanded a brigade of cavalry at the Battle of Mahidpur.

Alexander Russell was an eminent doctor and naturalist and in 1756 published a Natural History of Aleppo.

In England, another family, the descendants of Rufus became Dukes of Bedford. The third son of the sixth Duke was John Russell who studied at the University of Edinburgh where he greatly admired the independent and democratic philosophy of the Scots. In politics he was the architect of the first Reform Act 1832 and served as Prime Minister of the United Kingdom. He was created Earl Russell in 1861. His grandson was Bertrand Russell who was one of the great philosophers of the twentieth century.

== Coats of Arms ==
Russell of that Ilk

Russel of that Ilk, another version

Russell of Ashiestiel

Russell of Ashiestiel, another version

Russell of Blackbraes

Russell of Charlton Park

Russell of Kingseat

== Castles ==
- Ashiesteel House, three miles west of Galashiels in the Scottish Borders is a mansion that incorporates a tower house dating from the seventeenth century. It was owned by the Russles but was later home to Sir Walter Scott who wrote several of his works there.
- Banff Castle, east of Banff, Aberdeenshire was originally owned by the Clan Comyn but later passed to the Sharps and then the Russells. Little remains of the original castle and a Robert Adam mansion was built there in the eighteenth century.
- Montcoffer House, two miles south of Banff, is a mansion dating from 1670. The Russels sold it to the Duff Duke of Fife in 1750. It was remodelled in 1825.
- Aden House, a mansion ten miles west of Peterhead in Aberdeenshire, is now a ruinous shell that dates from 1832. The present building had replaced an old castle. The Russells sold the house and most of the estate it in 1937. The grounds were said to be haunted by the ghost of one of the daughters of one of the owners.
- Blackhall Castle, was two miles west of Banchory in Aberdeenshire and was a strong castle but nothing now remains. It was held by the Russells and then by the Clan Hay.
