= Clan Fenton =

Scottish clan

Arms of Fenton of that Ilk.

Clan Fenton is a Scottish clan. It does not have a clan chief recognised by the Lord Lyon King of Arms therefore the clan has no standing under Scots Law. Clan Fenton is considered an armigerous clan, meaning that it is considered to have had at one time a chief who possessed the chiefly arms, however no one at present is in possession of such arms. the arms of Fenton of that Ilk are blazoned as: Gules, a bend engrailed Argent.

The clan held the lands of Fenton at Dirleton in East Lothian. Sir William Fenton, who was styled "Lord of Beaufort" was one of the auditors that gathered at Berwick debating the competing claims between Robert the Bruce and John de Balliol. According to the heraldist Alexander Nisbet, William or perhaps his son married Cecilia Bisset the co-heiress of William Bisset, Lord of Lovat. The principal line of the Lowland Fentons ended in the marriage between an heiress and Whitelaw of that Ilk.

The family originated at Fenton near Dirleton but by the mid 13th century had made their demesne at the castle of Baikie on an island between two small lochs in the parish of Airlie in Angus. Their arms are displayed in an aumbry in the parish church of Airlie. Through marriage about 1275 they gained lands near Inverness at Beaufort, which title they used in contracts in that area.
