= Clan Gray =

Scottish Lowland clan

Clan Gray crest badge

Clan Gray is a Scottish clan from Perthshire in the Scottish Lowlands.

== History ==
=== Coat of Arms ===
The Gray coat of arms are 'Gules. A lion rampant within a bordure engrailed argent Crest. An anchor in pale or Suppartors. Two lions guardant gules. Motto : Anchor fast anchor. The clan can also be regarded as a sept of the larger Clan Sutherland.

=== Origins of the Clan ===
The surname Gray is French in origin, being first borne by Fulbert, chamberlain of Robert I, Duke of Normandy. From this service Fulbert was granted the castle and the lands of Croy/Gray, Haute-Saône in Picardy which is where Fulbert assumed the surname Gray. Fulbert had two children: a son, John, and a daughter, Arlotta/Herleva who was the mother of William the Conqueror. Fulbert then travelled to England with William and obtained 'several lordships' and was the progenitor of a number of families who used the surname Gray or Grey. A number of these families achieved high rank with some obtaining the rank of 'Duke of Suffolk, Duke of Norfolk, Earl of Stamford,Earl of Tankerville, Barons of Codnor, Rutliyn, Wilton, Rollestone, Wark (Baron Grey of Werke) and Chillingham, Northumberland'.

Baron Grey of Chillingham gave the lands of Broxmouth (Broxburn, East Lothian) in the Scottish county of Roxburghshire to one of his younger sons in the reign of William the Lion King of Scotland. The son Andrew added to the family's possessions and obtained the lands of Browfield near Roxburgh in 1214. The Greys of Broxmouth changed their name to the Scottish 'de Gray' with John de Gray being made a steward to the Earls of March in the reign of Alexander III of Scotland. A subsequent relation of John de Gray, Sir Hugh inherited Broxmouth and had three sons, Sir Hugh de Gray, Henry de Gray, and John de Gray. Sir Hugh and Henry swore fealty to Edward I of England in 1296, signing the Ragman Rolls. Sir High de Gray died around 1300 and had a son, Sir Andrew de Gray.

== Lineage ==
=== Sir Andrew Gray ===
Sir Andrew supported and followed Robert the Bruce in the Wars of Scottish Independence and in 1307 joined Sir James Douglas, 'the Black Douglas' and Sir Alexander Fraser of Touchfraser and Cowie in commanding a detachment against the English supporting Lord of Lorne. Sir Andrew de Gray in 1312 was one of the first to scale the walls of Edinburgh Castle and take the stronghold for Robert the Bruce. For his loyalty Sir Andrew was given the barony of longforgan in Perthshire which was taken from Edmund de Hastings after he fell fighting for the English in the Battle of Bannockburn. It is also to be remembered that Edmund de Hastings was a close relation of John de Hastings who has previously submitted a claim to the Kingdom of Scotland to Edward I alongside Robert the Bruce's claim and Edward Balliol claim. Sir Andrew later married Ada Gifford daughter of Thomas Lord Yester and had two sons, Sir David and Thomas.

Sir David de Gray, 'fourth baron of Broxmouth and second of Longforgan' died between 1354 and 1357 and was succeeded by his son Sir John de Gray. Sir John was one of twenty men sent as hostages in 1354 to be a surety for David I of Scotland ransom after his capture by the English. For his service Sir John was appointed in 1357 to Clerk register for King David and remained in position under the reign of Robert II of Scotland retaining the office for 'the rest of his life'. Sir John was succeeded on his death by his son Sir Patrick who due to his good relationship with King Robert II of Scotland added considerably to his lands in Perthshire. In 1371 Andrew paid homage to Robert II at Scone, Scotland. In 1385 it is recorded that Sir Andrew Gray 'Lord of the Chefe Barony of Longforganade' (Longforgan) with many nobles present settled a land dispute on top of a 'Moot Hill' Moot hill called the Hill of Longforgan. In 1413 Sir Patrick entered into a manrent (contract) with the Earl of Crawfordfor the town of Elith which has since been annexed by the town of Alyth. Sir John had four sons and three daughters. Sir Andrew his eldest met James I of Scotland in Durham, England in 1423 to assist in the negotiations for the King's release.

=== Andrew 1st Lord Gray ===
Andrew was created 1st Lord of Fowlis Fowlis Castle in 1445 by the King James II of Scotland. He was the son of Sir Andrew Gray of Broxmouth and inherited the lands of Fowlis from his mother Janet Mortimer, daughter of Sir Roger Mortimer of Fowlis in the county of Angus, Scotland, the union of his parents did much to enhance the wealth and status of the Grays in Scotland. Lord Gray of Fowlis, was one of the hostages for King James I of Scotland, in his father's lifetime, when his annual revenue was estimated at six hundred Merks (coin). He was released in 1427 and was one of the knights who accompanied Princess Margaret of Scotland to France in 1436 for her marriage to the French Dauphin. Andrew was created an ambassador to England in 1449. He later obtained in 1452 the royal license from King James to build a castle on his lands whereby Lord Andrew built Castle HuntlyCastle Huntly on his estates in Longforgan. Longforgan name derives from the old British language 'Lon-for-gron' which translates to 'The flat land above the marsh'. Huntly castle stands on a volcanic outcrop which rises about 50 feet above the level of the Carse which gives the castle a 'commanding position' and an 'uninterrupted view over miles of the surrounding country'.

Lord Gray married Elizabeth Wemyss the eldest daughter of Sir John John Wemyss (landowner) in Fife. One of Andrew's daughter married Sir William Hay of Errol. In 1452 Lord Andrew made a long pilgrimage to the Holy site of Canterbury Cathedral.

Between 1465 and 1466 Lord Gray was further granted the lands of cluney/clunieby the King. In 1467 Andrew 1st Lord Gray alongside the Bishop of Brechin, the abbot of St. Cross, the abbot of Lundor, the lord of Lindissay, the lord of Borthwic represented the Commissioners of the Burghs of their local communities and paid the crown in Edinburgh money collected from the burghs and their estates. Lord Andrew 1st Lord Gray died in around 1470. Andrew first Lord Gray appears as a justiciar in Aberdeen in 1450 as well as holding the title of 'master of the kings household', it is also recorded that Andrew was involved in the assassination of the eighth Earl of Douglas in 1452. In 1451 Lord Gray was present and witnessed King James's granting of the lands of wigtown to William Earl of Douglas and Avondale and Lord of Galloway. In 1472 it was decreed that Andrew Gray would pay 'James of Shaw of Sauchie' 'five bolls of wheat, five bolls of oats and two and a half merks for silver' for the 'mails and ferms of the lands of Abernyte'.

Andrew is probably responsible for the painting of the 'rood screen Crucifixion' located at Fowlis Easter Church. The Lord was patron of the church after it was rebuilt in 1453 due to the proximity of the church to Andrew's estates at Fowlis Castle. In 1497 Dean James Gray who was a part of the Gray clan presented a panel painting to King James IV of Scotland who visited Fowlis Easter. Inside of the church there is a stained glass window in the East Wall which has a representation of the Gray clans coat of arms directly in the centre with their motto 'Anchor Fast Anchor' clearly visible. Due to Lord Gray's murder of the Earl of Douglas in 1450 the church required penance which took the form of 'endowing' the church of Fowlis Easter which today stands as one of the 'finest pre-Reformation churches in the country'.

=== Andrew 2nd Lord Gray ===
The title of Lord Gray was inherited by Andrew, the grandson of Andrew 1st Lord Gray and son of Sir Patrick Gray of Kinneff who died before his father. Patrick 2nd Lord Gray married Janet, daughter of Lord Keith which connected the Gray family and the powerful Marischal Family. After Janet's death Patrick married Lady Elizabeth Stewart daughter of the Earl of Atholl. Andrew 2nd Lord Gray's aunt married Sir Patrick M'Lellan, whose son Patrck was beheaded by the Earl of Douglas in 1452 In June 1489 Andrew 2nd Lord Gray Gray was awarded the lands of lundie in Angus, and the office of justice-general of the north, forfeited by Robert, second Lord Lyle who died in 1497. Andrew, 2nd Lord Gray built Broughty Castle in 1496. One of Andrew 2nd Lord Gray's daughters Elizabeth married in 1487 John Lyon the Lord of Glamis. After he died she married Alexander, Earl of Huntly, and at his death in 1504 she married George, Earl of Rothes. Elizabeth Gray was responsible for building 'Gowrie House'Gowrie House (Perth, Scotland) in Perth. Another daughter of Andrew 2nd Lord Gray Janet married John Charteris of Cuthilgourdy who was Provost of Perth. In 1508 Andrew Lord Gray who was also at this point High Justiciary north of the Forth ordered in favour of the magistrates of Perth £100 Scots of the 'Justice Ayre' to be used in repairing and upholding the 'Bridge of Tay'. In 1488 Patrick was granted the hereditary title of high Sheriff of Angus, and a few years later he was created 'Lord Justiciar of Scotland'. Patrick also added to the Gray clan's lands through the acquisition of the lands of 'Balgillo' and the 'Rock of Broughty' where he erected the Castle of Broughty Ferry. One of Andrew's sons Robert was killed at the Battle of Flodden fighting for the young Scottish king.

=== Patrick 3rd Lord Gray ===
Patrick succeeded his father Andrew in the Lordship of Gray and is recorded to have died at his home of Castle Huntly in 1541. Patrick married Lady Jane Gordon daughter of the Earl of Huntly. He had a number of daughters but no sons so was therefore succeeded by his nephew Patrick, 4th Lord Gray who was the son of Gilbert Gray of Buttergask son of Andrew second Lord Gray.

=== Patrick 4th Lord Gray ===
Patrick succeeded his uncle Patrick 3rd Lord Gray. His father was Gilbert Gray of Buttergask son of Andrew 2nd Lord Gray and his mother Egidia Mercer who was from the prominent Mercer family. He died in 1584 leaving 6 sons and 7 daughters. In 1565 the 'Gray Clan' acquired Skibo Castle and its 7,500 acres, previously it was owned by the Bishops of Cathness. There were already a number of Gray clansmen living north of Forfarshire due to in 1456 the son of the 1st Lord Gray of Fowlis fleeing to the area after 'killing the Constable of Dundee'. In 1579 the Lady Innermeath's estate of Redcastle was attacked and plundered by Andrew Gray a son of Patrick Lord Gray and owner of the nearby estate of Duninald. The Gray Clan also owned the nearby estates of Sordell and Ardinsh.

=== Patrick 5th Lord Gray ===
Patrick, 5th Lord Gray succeeded his father Patrick to the Lordship of Gray. He had a family of 7 sons and 5 daughters whereby he was succeeded by his son Patrick the 6th Lord Gray. It's recorded that Patrick who was Master of Gray was a 'political rival' of the Arran Family/Clan and was 'ultimately responsible for their fall from power', he provided proof of Elizabeth Stewart's role in selling official pardons 'within the court of session', Elizabeth was the Countess of Arran at the time. In 1587 Patrick was accused of treason against the King by Sir William Stewart, with Patrick accused of spying on the kings letters with France and that he was assisting in the assassination of the King's own mother. Patrick Master of Gray was found guilty but had his life spared through the insistence of Lord Hamilton. He was banished from court and the rents from the abbey of Dunfermline were seized, however the rest of the Gray lands remained in Patrick's ownership. Andrew Gray a relation of the Gray clan acquired the barony and mansion of Ivergowrie from Sir David Murray which is shown by his name and designation appearing frequently between '1590 and 1608'.

=== Patrick 6th Lord Gray ===
Patrick, 6th Lord Gray succeeded his father Patrick 5th Lord Gray. He firstly married Elizabeth Lyon, daughter of Lord Glamis, after her death Patrick married Mary Stuart daughter of Robert Earl of Orkney. He was succeeded by his son Andrew 7th Lord Gray.

=== Andrew 7th Lord Gray ===
Andrew, 7th Lord Gray succeeded his father Patrick to the Lordship of Gray. He had one son who died before his father and a daughter Anne Mistress of Gray. She married William Gray who was the eldest son of Sir William Gray of Pittendrum. Sir William was a 'great merchant' who was imprisoned by the Parliamentarians in Edinburgh Castle for supporting the Royalist cause and fined by the parliament of St Andrews for 'corresponding with Montrose' a fellow Royalist. She obtained a patent of nobility from Charles I whereby the titles and estates of her father Andrew 7th Lord Gray would be bestowed upon her son Patrick Gray.

=== Patrick 8th Lord Gray ===
Patrick, 8th Lord Gray succeeded his grandfather Patrick to the Lordship. He married Barbra Murray daughter of Lord Balvaird and had one daughter Majory Mistress of Gray. Majory married John Gray of Crichie.

=== John 9th Lord Gray ===
Through a patent of nobility John Gray of Crichie became the 9th Lord Gray from his father in-law Patrick 8th Lord Gray. He had 5 sons and 4 daughters with his wide Majory Gray. John 9th Lord Gray was responsible for building the House of Gray near Dundee due to the family leaving Fowlis castle in 1669.

=== John 10th Lord Gray ===
John 10th Lord Gray succeeded his father John 9th Lord Gray in 1726. He married Helen Stuart, daughter of Lord Blantyre. He was succeeded by his son John 11th Lord Gray.

=== John 11th Lord Gray ===
John 11th Lord Gray succeeded his father in 1741. He married Margaret Blair heiress of Kinfauns who had 5 sons and 7 daughters. John held the titles of Sheriff Principal of Forfarshire and Lord Lieutenant of Perthshire

In 1747 Lord John Gray made a case for the Gray family to continue to be hereditary holders of the 'Sheriffship' of Forfar.

=== Charles 12th Lord Gray ===
Charles 12th Lord Gray succeeded his father John 11th Lord Gray. He remained unmarried and died in 1786.

=== William 13th Lord Gray ===
William 13th Lord Gray succeeded his brother Charles 12th Lord Gray. William inherited his mother Margret Blair's property of Kinfauns Castle in 1790. William never married and died in 1807.

=== Francis 14th Lord Gray ===
Francis 14th Lord Gray succeeded his brother William to the lordship of Gray in 1807. Francis was responsible for the re-building Kinfauns Castle in 1822. He also erected a number of new farms and cottages on his estates to improve the Gray's collection of properties. Francis was a fellow of the Royal Society, President of the Society of Antiquaries and a Tory peer at Westminster where he met Sir Robert Smirke who later became the architect of the re-built Kinfauns castle. Francis also had a house in Edinburgh

=== 15th Lord Gray ===
Francis was succeeded by his son who died without issue. One of Francis's daughters Margret married John Grant of Kilgraston in 1820.
