= Clan Aiton =

Scottish clan

- Motto: Decerptae Dabunt Odorum (Roses plucked will give sweet smell)

Profile
- District: Berwickshire (historic); Fife
- Clan Aiton no longer has a chief, and is an armigerous clan
- Historic seat: Ayton, Scottish Borders

Clan Aiton is a Scottish clan that is recognized as such by the Lord Lyon King of Arms. However, as the clan does not currently have a chief recognized by the Court of the Lord Lyon, it is therefore considered an armigerous clan.

== Clan profile ==
- Motto: Decerptae Dabunt Odorum (Roses plucked will give sweet smell)
- Crest: A hand pulling a rose, Proper
