= Clan Moubray =

Scottish clan

- Motto: Fortitudine (With fortitude)

Profile
- Region: Lowland
- District: Perthshire, West Lothian and Fife
- Clan Moubray no longer has a chief, and is an armigerous clan

Clan Moubray is a Scottish clan of the Scottish Lowlands. The clan is officially recognized by the Lord Lyon King of Arms, however as the clan does not currently have a chief recognized by the Court of the Lord Lyon, it is therefore considered an Armigerous clan.

== History ==
Moubray, also seen as Mowbray and Mobray, is a name of Norman origin, coming from the House of Mowbray from ancient barony of Montbray in Normandy.

Robert de Moubray, is first recorded as witness to the gift of Staplegortoun to Kelso Abbey, during the reign of Malcolm IV of Scotland.

The Moubray’s were supporters of John Balliol and the English during the First War of Scottish Independence and were forfeited of lands before switching sides to Robert the Bruce.

== Castles and manors ==
- Barnbougle Castle.
- Dalmeny House, possibly fortified manor.
- Methven Castle, held till 13th century, regained in 1346 and then held till 15th century.
- Bavelaw Castle, held from 15th to 16th century.
- Kellie Castle, fortified manor held until 13th century.
- Otterston Castle, held from 16th till 19th century.
