= Standing Council of Scottish Chiefs =

Organisation composed of the chiefs of many Scottish clans

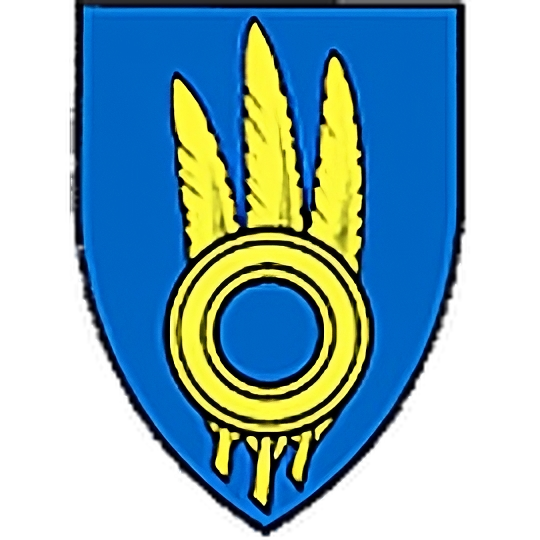
- Abbreviation: SCSC
- Formation: 1951
- Purpose: Represents Scottish chiefs
- Region served: Scotland
- Members: 135
- Convenor: Sir Malcolm MacGregor of MacGregor, Chief of Clan Gregor

The Standing Council of Scottish Chiefs (SCSC) is an organisation that represents many prominent clan chiefs and Chiefs of the Name and Arms in Scotland. It claims to be the primary and most authoritative source of information on the Scottish clan system.

== History ==
The organisation was originally founded in 1952 by Diana Hay, 23rd Countess of Erroll and chief of Clan Hay, who served as the Lord High Constable of Scotland at the time. Since its founding, the council has convened regularly to discuss matters of importance to the clan system.

As of August 2023, Sir Malcolm MacGregor, chief of Clan Gregor, is currently serving as the acting convenor of the council. Sir Malcolm assumed the convenor role following Donald MacLaren, chief of Clan MacLaren in July 2023. Prior to MacLaren's tenure, Sir Malcolm had previously held the role himself.

== Objectives ==
The non-political Council has several key objectives:

1. To consider matters affecting Scottish chiefs, clans, and their associated names.
2. To submit views and represent the interests of chiefs, clans, and names to various government bodies, including HM Government, Departments of State, and the Scottish Government.
3. To submit views and represent interests to local authorities, the press, and the general public.
4. To engage with associations connected to clans and families both in Britain and overseas.
5. To educate the general public about the historical rights, roles, and positions of Scottish chiefs and the clans/names they represent.
6. To take steps deemed prudent to protect the titles, coats of arms, or other insignia of chiefs from inappropriate commercial exploitation or misuse.

== Non-members ==
The following chiefs have, by their own request, been removed as members of the Standing Council of Scottish Chiefs:

- James Carnegie, 3rd Duke of Fife - Chief of Clan Carnegie
- Charles Fergusson - Chief of Clan Fergusson
- Alexander Haig, 3rd Earl Haig - Chief of Clan Haig
- Robert Lindsay, 29th Earl of Crawford and 12th Earl of Balcarres - Chief of Clan Lindsay
- David Menzies - Chief of Clan Menzies
- Bruce Murray, 12th Duke of Atholl - Chief of Clan Murray
- Grey Ruthven, 2nd Earl of Gowrie - Chief of Clan Ruthven

== See also ==
- Standing Council of Irish Chiefs and Chieftains
