= Clan Wood =

Lowland Scottish clan

- Crest: A ship under sail Proper.
- Motto: Tutus in Undis

Profile
- District: Fife

Chief
- Oonagh Wood of Largo, Baroness of Largo
- Chief of Clan Wood
- Historic seat: Largo Castle

Clan Wood is a Lowland Scottish clan from North Esk, Largo Bay and Angus in Scotland.

== Origins of the surname ==
The surname Wood is common throughout Britain. There are two possible origins of the name. The most common origin is from a topographic name, used to describe a person who lived in or worked in a wood or forest. A less common origin of the name is as a nickname for an eccentric or violent person.

=== Admiral Sir Andrew Wood ===
Admiral Sir Andrew Wood of Largo, Fife, was born around the middle of the 15th century. Sir Andrew was the eldest son of William Wood, a merchant, who was almost certainly a scion of the prominent Wood families holding lands in Banffshire, Aberdeenshire, Kincardineshire, Perthshire and Angus. He was employed by James III of Scotland to protect Scottish trade with Holland. Wood also defended Dumbarton in 1481 against a fleet of Edward IV of England. During the Battle of Sauchieburn, Wood's ships sailed up and down the Forth, taking on board wounded soldiers. He was famous for inflicting many defeats on foreign pirates and privateers as well as squadrons of ships sent by the English government to harass the Scots. After winning several sea battles in the 1480s against the English, he was made a free Baron, with lands including Largo in Fife. Some records suggest that he was also made a chief of Clan MacDonald for his help in the king's expedition by land and sea after which Domhnall Dubh of the Isles was captured and kept in prison for forty years. Sir Andrew's ruined castle can be found in Upper Largo.

Sir Andrew Wood's grandson was amongst the barons of Parliament in 1560 who subscribed to the Articles for upholding the new reformed religion. He quickly joined those upholding the claim of the infant James VI of Scotland, after the downfall of Mary, Queen of Scots.

Sir Andrew's successors built a hospital and a school in Fife for their kinsmen named Wood, and were prominent in Scottish history both politically and militarily. They continued to be a significant influence in British politics and were foremost among the thousands of Scots who contributed enormously to the economic and armed expansion of the British Empire well into the 19th century. The main line of Sir Andrew's descendants is considered by the Court of the Lord Lyon King of Arms to be the chiefly one. The record of succession is complete right down to modern times.

== Clan profile ==
Timothy Michael Herbert Fawcett Wood, has matriculated the undifferenced Arms and Supporters of the first Chief of Clan Wood in the present line, Admiral Sir Andrew Wood of Largo in Fife, at the Court of the Lord Lyon King of Arms of Scotland. He is the hereditary Representative of the Ancient Family of Wood of Largo and Chief of the Name. The crest badge that is used by members of the clan comprises the Crest of the Chief's Arms held within a traditional strap and buckle and contains the motto of the Clan's Chiefs, which is TUTUS IN UNDIS (Latin: "Safe on the Waves").

According to the clan's official website, since 2017, Oonagh Elizabeth Susan Fawcett Wood has succeeded her father as Representative of the Ancient Family of Wood of Largo and Chief of the Name and Baroness of Largo. She is the middle offspring of her late father and is predominantly based in London England.

== Clan castles ==
Largo Castle which was to the north of Lower Largo in Fife was the main castle connected with the Clan Wood. The castle dated from the fifteenth century but it was replaced by Largo House which was started in about 1750. The only remains of the original castle are a single round tower with a conical roof. The castle was held by the infamous Andrew Wood of the fifteenth and sixteenth centuries.
