= Scottish crest badge =

Scottish clan emblem

Crest badge of a clan chief of a fictional Scottish clan. A clan chief is the only one entitled to three eagle feathers.

A Scottish crest badge is a heraldic badge worn to show allegiance to an individual or membership in a specific Scottish clan. Crest badges are commonly called "clan crests", but this is a misnomer; there is no such thing as a collective clan crest, just as there is no such thing as a clan coat of arms.

Crest badges consist of a heraldic crest and a motto/slogan. These elements are heraldic property and protected by law in Scotland. Crest badges may be worn by anyone, but those who are not legally entitled to the heraldic elements wear a crest badge that incorporates a strap and buckle, which indicates that the wearer is a follower of the individual who owns the crest and motto. An armiger who is entitled to the heraldic elements may wear a crest badge that incorporates a circlet.

Crest badges are commonly worn by members of Scottish clans. These badges usually consist of elements from the clan chief's coat of arms. Clan members who wear their chief's crest and motto surrounded by a strap and buckle show they are members of the chief's clan (family). There are established clans that do not have chiefs recognised by the Lord Lyon King of Arms. In such cases, clan members sometimes wear the crest badge of the last known chief. Some clans wear crest badges derived from the arms of individuals who were never recognised as clan chiefs. Although so-called "clan crests" are commonly bought and sold, the heraldic crest and motto belong to the chief alone and never to the individual clan member.

Crest badges, much like clan tartans, do not have a long history and owe much to Victorian era romanticism, having only been worn on the bonnet since the 19th century. The original badges used by clans are said to have been specific plants worn in bonnets or hung from a pole or spear.

== Introduction ==
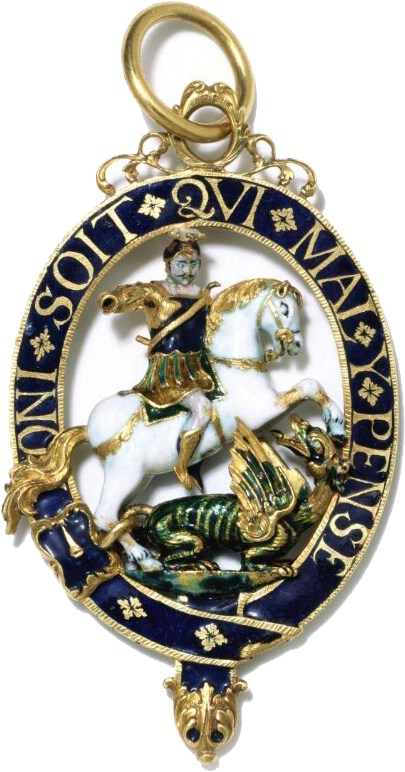
Scottish crest badges should only be illustrated in monochrome, not in colour. Under no circumstances should the strap be coloured blue and the buckle gold, like the badge of the Order of the Garter (pictured).

Although the term "clan crest" is most commonly used, it is a misnomer. There is in fact no such thing as a clan crest. Although it is possible to purchase "clan crests", and the crest badge itself can be owned by a clan member, the heraldic crest and motto of the badge belong to the chief alone and never the clan member. The crest and motto are the sole property of the chief, and clan members are only permitted to wear the badge in a show of allegiance to their clan and clan chief. It is illegal for a clan member to misappropriate the chief's crest and motto in acts such as decorating silverware or inscriptions on signet rings and jewellery. In short, coats of arms, crests and mottos are the personal property of one person only, and in terms of "clan crests", they are the property of the clan chief.

Crest badges are specifically used for people to wear, and they are made out of silver or white metal. When illustrated, crest badges should only be printed in monochrome, and they should not be coloured. Women are entitled to wear a crest badge as a brooch, generally worn on the left side, and as such the crest badge may be made of gold.

There are established clans which do not have a chief recognised by the Lord Lyon King of Arms. In such cases, clan members usually wear a crest badge which contains the crest and motto of the last known chief. However, there are instances where such clans wear crest badges which are based upon the arms of someone who was never a recognised clan chief. For example, Clan Macfie, which current does not have a chief, uses a crest badge which is derived from the arms of one of the first two Macfies who registered Arms at Lyon Court. Clan MacEwen, whose chiefly line had been untraced since the 15th century, had a crest badge containing the crest and motto of a prominent baronet bearing the surname McEwen (the baronet has since been recognized as Chief of the Clan). Another instance is the crest badge of Clan MacInnes. This crest badge is based upon a modern coat of arms of an armigerous clan member, not a clan chief. (Note: The International Association of Clan MacInnes has attempted to have this crest badge changed to one of its own creation, bearing the motto MACAONGHAIS A-RITHIST (translation from Scottish Gaelic: "Again MacInnes").)

According to the English officers of arms John Martin Robinson and Thomas Woodcock, crests have played a relatively insignificant role in Scottish heraldry when compared to English heraldry. In consequence, many Scottish armigers, including clan chiefs, have comparatively similar crests to one another. Because of this, crest badges can sometimes show an obvious association with another clan. For example, clans associated with the Chattan Confederation share very similar crest badges bearing wild cats. (Note: Clans Chattan, MacBain, Macgillivray, Mackintosh, Macpherson, and MacThomas. See List of crest badges used by Scottish clan members for comparison of crest badges.) Clans associated with Clan MacTavish —Clan Campbell of Breadalbane, Clan MacIver and Clan Campbell— use a crest badges which contain similar crests and mottoes that allude to that of the chief of Clan MacTavish.

=== Who is entitled to wear a crest badge? ===
A person does not need to be a member of a clan society to be able to wear a crest badge. Anyone may wear it, not just clan societies and clan society members. According to the Court of the Lord Lyon, clan membership goes with the surname. However, some people who do not bear a clan surname wear the crest badge of their mother's clan, and anyone who offers allegiance to a clan chief is a member of that clan (unless the chief decides to refuse that person's allegiance). Many people bear names that, while not actual clan surnames, are sept names or associated names of certain clans. Surnames such as Smith, Wright, Fletcher, and Miller are examples of names that are associated names of many clans (as every clan would have its own smiths, wrights, fletchers, and millers).

== Elements ==
Scottish crest badges may contain the following elements:

Crest	A crest stands above the wreath which stands above the shield in a coat of arms. It is impossible to own a crest if one is not in possession of a coat of arms, as the crest is adjunct to the coat of arms. In Scottish heraldry, the crest is usually accompanied with the motto or slogan, and sometimes an additional motto or slogan is granted which may also appear on a clan member's crest badge.
Wreath	The wreath appears on a coat of arms between the crest and helmet. When on a crest badge, the wreath is always shown below the crest to show that it is a heraldic crest and not another object.
Coronet	A coronet or antique crown may replace the wreath in some crests, such as that of Clan Dewar or Clan MacQuarrie. The antique crown (pictured top) consists of five visible spikes (three and two-halves). The coronet (pictured bottom), referred to as a "crest coronet", consists of three visible strawberry leaves (one and two-halves).
Chapeau	The heraldic chapeau can replace the wreath in some crests (such as that of Clan Farquharson), and it may also appear between the wreath and the crest. The chapeau indicates the owner's baronial rank.

== Wearing the crest badge ==
Clan chiefs, clan chieftains, armigerous clan members, and non-armigerous clan members may wear crest badges. However, there are differences in the type of crest badges they wear.

=== Clan chiefs ===

A clan chief is the head of their clan/family, and is the representer of the family's founder. A clan chief must be recognised as such by the Lord Lyon King of Arms, and must possess the undifferenced arms of their name.

Clan chiefs may wear their crest simpliciter, that is without being encircled by the motto and without any feathers. It is more common, however, for a clan chiefs to wear their own personal crest within a plain circlet inscribed with their motto or slogan (pictured left). The chief's crest badge does not contain the strap and buckle that other clan members are permitted to wear. Clan chiefs are also entitled to wear three eagle feathers (Note: The use of feathers is one of custom and convention, and has no legal basis.) behind the circlet of their crest badge. On certain occasions, such as clan gatherings, it may be appropriate to use real eagle feathers. Clan chiefs that are members of the British Peerage or a feudal baron are entitled to wear the appropriate coronet or baronial chapeau above the circlet on their crest badge, though this is a matter of personal preference.

=== Clan chieftains ===

Clan chieftains are the representers of large branches of a Scottish clan. They are officially recognised as clan chieftains by the Lord Lyon King of Arms.

Clan chieftains, like clan chiefs, may wear their own personal crest within a plain circlet inscribed with their own motto or slogan. Clan chieftains may also wear two small eagle feathers (unlike the chief's three). (Note: The use of feathers is one of custom and convention, and has no legal basis.) On certain occasions real eagle feathers may be worn behind the crest badge. If a clan chieftain is a member of the British Peerage or a feudal baron they are permitted to wear the appropriate coronet or baronial chapeau above the circlet on their crest badge. Clan chieftains may also wear the crest badge of their chief, in the same manner as an un-armigerous clan member (see Un-armigerous clan members below).

==== Feudal barons ====
Recently, feudal barons have taken to wearing two eagle feathers behind their armiger's badge, but there is no ancient tradition of this; it is solely based upon the fact that anciently feudal barons were most likely to have been chiefs or chieftains. If the feudal baron is a member of a clan, it is advisable to consult the clan chief on clan customs and traditions. The Lord Lyon only gives guidance and not governance on the wearing of feathers and recommends consulting with a clan chief, who approves the number of feathers worn by members of the clan for clan events.

=== Armigerous clan members ===

In terms of Scottish heraldry, an armiger is someone who has registered their own coat of arms, or has inherited a coat of arms according to the Laws of Arms in Scotland from an ancestor who had arms recorded in the Lyon Register.

Armigers, like clan chiefs and chieftains, may wear their own personal crest within a plain circlet inscribed with their own motto or slogan. Armigers are permitted to wear one silver eagle feather behind the circlet (or on certain occasions a real eagle feather). (Note: The use of feathers is one of custom and convention, and has no legal basis.) If an armiger is a member of the British peerage or a feudal baron, they are permitted to wear the appropriate coronet or baronial chapeau above the circlet on their crest badge. If an armiger is a member of a Scottish clan, they may wear the crest badge of their chief, however it must be encircled by a strap and buckle (see Un-armigerous clan members below).

=== Non-armigerous clan members ===

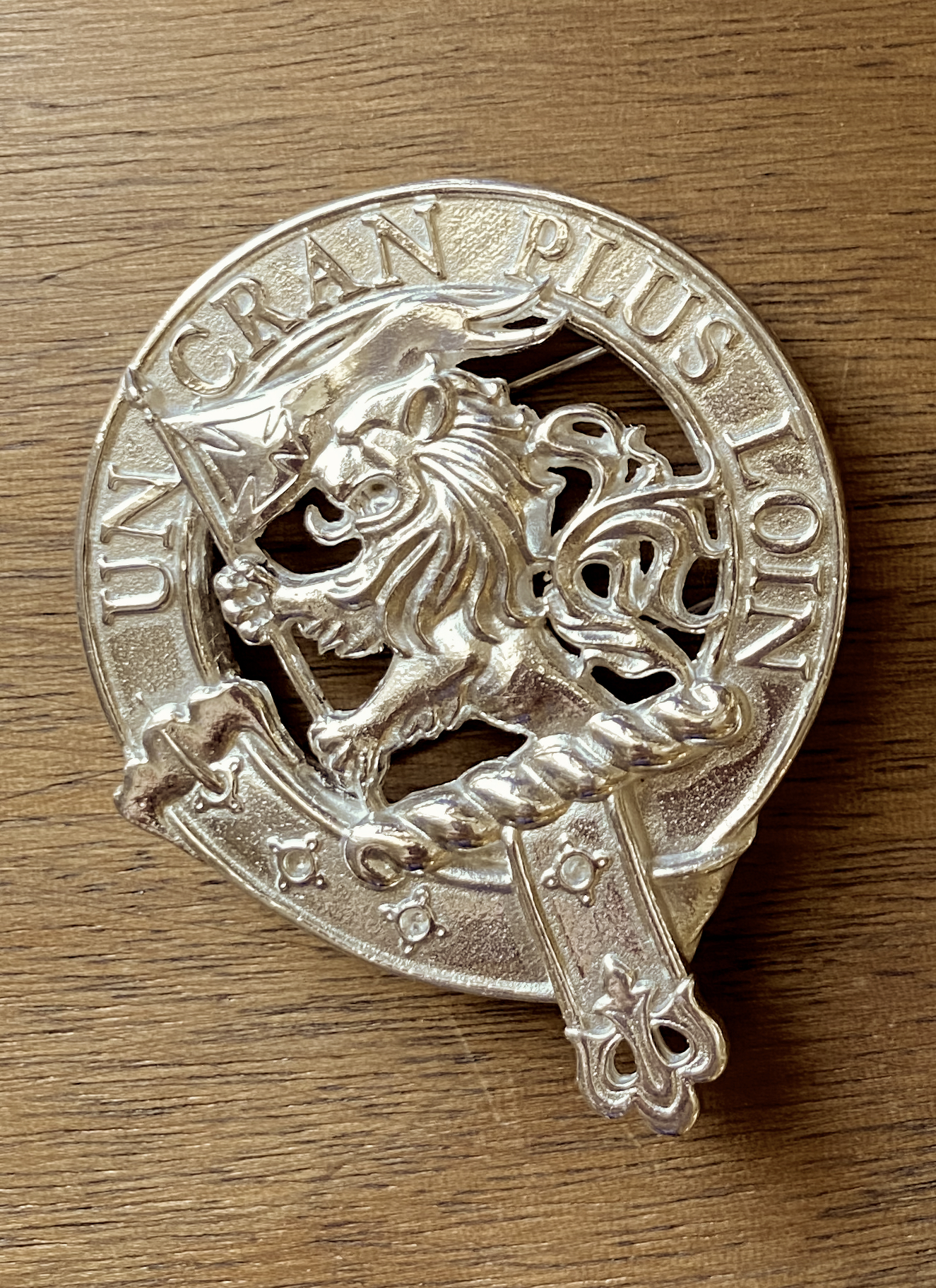
Crest badge of Brim-DeForest of Balvaird in silver

Members of Scottish clans are considered, by the Court of the Lord Lyon, to be relatives of their clan chief. They can be either immediate family or extended family. Clan members can also be people who only bear the "clan surname" or a sept name associated with the clan. The Court of the Lord Lyon has also stated that anyone who professes allegiance to both the clan and its chief can be considered a clan member. All clan members may wear the chief's crest encircled by a strap and buckle inscribed with their chief's motto or slogan. Some followers of chieftains or feudal barons also wear a crest and buckle badge. The strap and buckle symbolises membership of the clan and allegiance to the clan chief.

== See also ==
- Scottish heraldry
- List of Scottish clans
- Clan badge, said to be the earlier of badges used by members of Scottish clans
- Heraldic badge, an English version of the crest badge
