= Scottish clan chief =

Representative of the founder of a Scottish clan

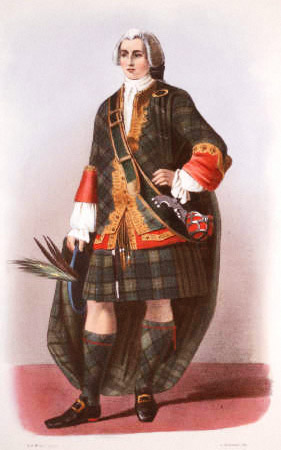
A depiction of the Clan Forbes clan chief illustrated by R. R. McIan, from James Logan's The Clans of the Scottish Highlands, 1845

The Scottish Gaelic word clann means children. In early times, and possibly even today, Scottish clan members believed themselves to descend from a common ancestor, the founder of the clan, after whom the clan is named. The clan chief (ceannard cinnidh) is the representative of this founder, and represents the clan. In the Scottish clan system, a chief is greater than a chieftain (ceann-cinnidh), a designation applied to heads of branches of a clan. Scottish clans that no longer have a clan chief are referred to as armigerous clans.

== Functions of the clan chief ==
Historically the principal function of the chief was to lead the clan in battle on land and sea. The chief and the chieftain were at one time in the Scottish Highlands influential political characters, who wielded a large and often arbitrary authority. However, none of this authority now remains. Highland chiefship or chieftainship in the modern sense is no more than a high social dignity. The existence of chiefship and chieftainship has been recognized by Scottish law; however, the disarming of the Highland clans after the 1745 Jacobite rising effectively eliminated clanship from ordinary civil or statutory law. Most notable was the Heritable Jurisdictions (Scotland) Act 1746 (20 Geo. 2. c. 43) that abolished traditional rights of jurisdiction afforded to Scottish clan chiefs.

== Recognition of chiefs in Scots law ==
=== "Clan chiefs" and "clan chieftains" ===
While Scottish law recognizes the existence of clans, chiefs and chieftains, this recognition is only one of social dignity or precedence via the Lyon Court, and does not involve any interest for which the law has jurisdiction. According to former Lord Lyon Sir Thomas Innes of Learney, a clan is a community that is distinguished by heraldry and recognised by the sovereign. Without that recognition, a clan chief, and therefore the clan, would have no official recognition. Innes further considered clans to be a "noble incorporation" because the arms borne by a clan chief are granted or otherwise recognised by the Lord Lyon as an officer of the Crown, thus conferring royal recognition of and on the entire clan. Clans with recognised chiefs are therefore considered a noble community under Scots law. A group without a chief recognised by the sovereign through the Lord Lyon has no official standing under Scottish law. Claimants to the title of chief are expected to be recognised by the Lord Lyon as the rightful heir to the undifferenced arms of the ancestor of the clan of which the claimant seeks to be recognized as chief. A chief of a clan is the only person who is entitled to bear the undifferenced arms of the ancestral founder of the clan. The clan is considered to be the chief's heritable estate and the chief's Seal of Arms is the seal of the clan as a "noble corporation". Therefore, under Scots law, the chief is recognised as the head of the clan and therefore, once recognised, serves as the lawful representative of the clan community worldwide. The Lyon Court remains the only authority which can make a recording of the dignity of a chiefship acknowledged by attestation, although it is suggested it cannot declare judicially a chiefship. Further, although no Scottish court can exercise a jurisdiction to determine disputes of competing claimants to a chiefship or chieftainship, to quote Lord Aitchinson in the Court of Session it is presumed that "Historically the idea of a chief or chieftain submitting his dignity to the arbitrament of its Court of law is really grotesque. The chief was the law, and his authority was derived from his own people".

A number of constitutional changes took place with the Scotland Act 1998. Schedule 5 of the act makes clear that certain matters are reserved, among others "honours and dignities or the functions of the Lord Lyon King of Arms so far as relating to the granting of arms"; but that is not the case for "Lord Lyon King of Arms in his judicial capacity", which is therefore subject to the powers of the Scottish Parliament. However, the Abolition of Feudal Tenure etc. (Scotland) Act 2000 (asp 5) explicitly states (in section 62) that "Nothing in this Act shall be taken to supersede or impair the jurisdiction or prerogative of the Lord Lyon King of Arms," which suggests that the legal authority of the Lyon Court remains intact in all matters heraldic.

To summarise, it is protocol and a preference for any Scottish clan to have their chief recognised by the Lord Lyon and therefore have legal status for the clan as a whole in Scotland and beyond, allowing their head to take their rightful place in the Standing Council of Scottish Chiefs.

=== Chief of the Name and Arms ===
The Lyon Court, whose jurisdiction is heraldic, can confirm an application for the Chief of the Name and Arms of a Scottish family. However, the "Chief of the Name and Arms" is a heraldic term, originating from the French chef du nom et des armes and refers to the head of a heraldic armigerous family. There is no evidence of any practice that would point to the use of chief of clan, or chieftain of branch of clan, as correct heraldic descriptions of headship of an armigerous family. The term chief of clan and principals of branches is not to persons bearing coats of arms; chiefship and chieftainship have no armorial significance. (Note: An exception to this armorial insignificance being the chief's right to supporters if the chief has a coat of arms, see paragraph "Clan Chief prerogatives: supporters" hereto.) Although the chief of clan and Chief of the Name and Arms may concur in the same person they are not the same term. See Chiefs of Clan Fraser for an example of chief of clan and Chief of the Name and Arms not being held by the same person.

A crest badge of a clan chief of a fictional Scottish clan.

=== Clan commander ===
In cases where a clan has no chief, or a family wishes to have recognition as a clan, clan or family members can formally get together, witnessed by a representative of the Lord Lyon, in a derbhfine, and appoint either a clan chief if the evidence of links to a chiefly line exists or otherwise a clan commander.

The Lyon Court can recognise the appointment of a clan commander, for an interim period of up to ten years, whereupon a further derbhfine will be required. It is at this point that the clan chief is recognised by the Lyon Court. Clans with clan commanders are still referred to as armigerous clans.

== Clan chief prerogatives ==
=== Supporters ===
Clan chiefs are entitled to supporters on their coat of arms to specify a very high dignity. A requirement of the Standing Council of Scottish Chiefs for membership, is that an applicant chief must demonstrate a right to hereditary supporters. A chief without supporters could only be allowed to serve on the council for their lifetime; each successive heir would have to be re-elected in the same manner.

=== Eagle feathers ===
Elements of the chief's arms are often found in the crest badge worn, usually on a bonnet, by members of Scottish clans. These crest badges contain, in most cases, the chief's heraldic crest, and heraldic motto (or sometimes the chief's secondary motto or slogan). Clan chiefs are entitled to wear three eagle feathers behind their crest badge. Clan chieftains are entitled to two eagle feathers. A clan member is not entitled to any feathers unless they have been granted arms by the Lord Lyon King of Arms, in which case they are an armiger and can wear a crest badge containing elements from their own arms.

=== Sashes ===
The sash, as worn by Scottish women as part of the national dress, is normally worn over the right shoulder; only the wives of chiefs and chieftains, and women who are chiefs or chieftains in their own right, wear it over the left shoulder.

== See also ==
- Standing Council of Scottish Chiefs
- Clan seat
- Statutes of Iona
- Clan
- Chief of the name

== Bibliography ==
- Adam, Frank; Innes of Learney, Thomas (1970). The Clans, Septs & Regiments of the Scottish Highlands (8th ed.). Edinburgh: Johnston and Bacon.
- Mark, Colin (2003). The Gaelic-English Dictionary: Am Faclair Gàidhlig-Beurla. Routledge. ISBN 0-415-29760-5.
- l'Académie Française (1843). Dictionnaire de l'Académie française (in French). Vol. Tome Premier (6th ed.). France: Firmin Didot frères.
- Maclean of Ardgour v. Maclean, 1938 S.L.T. 49 and 1941 S.C. 613 Scotland (Court of Session First Advising (16 July 1937), Second Advising (27 March 1941), Final Interlocutor (18 July 1941)).
- Gloag and Candlish Henderson (1987). Introduction to the Law of Scotland (9th ed.). Edinburgh: W. Green.
