= Ragman Rolls =

Scotland legislation

The Ragman Rolls are the collection of instruments by which the nobility and gentry of Scotland subscribed allegiance to King Edward I of England, during the time between the Conference of Norham in May 1291 and the final award in favour of Balliol in November 1292; and again in 1296. Of the former of these records two copies were preserved in the Chapter House at Westminster Abbey (now in the National Archives at Kew), and it has been printed by Thomas Rymer. Another copy, preserved originally in the Tower of London, is now also in the National Archives. The latter record, containing the various acts of homage and fealty extorted by Edward from John Balliol and others in the course of his progress through Scotland in the summer of 1296 and in August at the parliament of Berwick, was published by Prynne from the copy in the Tower and now in the National Archives. Both records were printed by the Bannatyne Club in 1834.

The derivation of the word ragman is described in several mixed and conflicting accounts. Various guesses as to its meaning and a list of examples of its use for legal instruments both in England and Scotland can be found in the preface to the Bannatyne Club's volume, and in Jamiesons Scottish Dictionary, s.v. Ragman. Brewer's Dictionary of Phrase and Fable defines "Ragman Roll" as follows:

originally meant the "Statute of Rageman" (De Ragemannis), a legate of Scotland, who compelled all the clergy to give a true account of their benefices, that they might be taxed at Rome accordingly. Subsequently it was applied to the four great rolls of parchment recording the acts of fealty and homage done by the Scotch nobility to Edward I. in 1296; these four rolls consisted of thirty-five pieces sewn together. The originals perished, but a record of them is preserved in the Rolls House, Chancery Lane.

The name ragman roll survives in the colloquial rigmarole, a lengthy and complicated statement or procedure. Merriam Webster gives a very different account of the origin of rigmarole, suggesting the source to be a medieval game of verse called a Ragman Roll, after a fictional king purported to be the author of the verses. The name of Ragman has been sometimes confined to the record of 1296. There is an account of this given in Calendar of Documents relating to Scotland preserved in the Public Record Office, London. According to the Oxford Dictionary of English Manuscript Terminology, the term "ragman" was used of documents containing numerous pendent seals.
