= Armigerous clan =

Term for a Scottish clan without a recognised chief

Armigerous clan (from armiger) is an informal term used to describe a Scottish clan, family, or name group that once had a chief recognised by the Court of the Lord Lyon as bearing undifferenced arms, but that no longer has a chief currently recognised as such.

Before 1745, all chiefs had arms; however, not all of these are recorded in the Public Register of All Arms and Bearings in Scotland, which was established in 1672.

== Background ==
In Scottish heraldry, only chiefs or heads of clans, families, or names bear undifferenced arms. A clan is considered a "noble incorporation" because a clan chief is a title of honour in Scotland and the chief confers his or her noble status onto the clan. Because armigerous clans do not have such chiefs, they are not recognised as noble communities and have no legal standing under Scots law.

=== A disputed term ===
The term "armigerous clan" is widely used informally, but its accuracy has been directly questioned by the Lord Lyon King of Arms. In some cases a chiefly line has died out — sometimes centuries earlier — and a clan society has subsequently been granted its own corporate arms as a temporary expedient. Dr Joseph Morrow, Lord Lyon King of Arms, has stated that describing the resulting body as an "armigerous clan" is a misnomer, since it is the society, not the clan itself, that holds the coat of arms: "The society has arms, not the clan. In fact, no clan has arms." The Court of the Lord Lyon's own published guidance states the same principle directly: "A clan cannot have a coat of arms. The Chief of a clan has his or her personal coat of arms but that belongs to the chief and cannot be used by anyone else." The Standing Council of Scottish Chiefs similarly notes that "since a clan is not a legal corporate body to whom Arms can be granted, a clan cannot itself be described as 'armigerous.'"

In ordinary usage, the term nonetheless serves as informal shorthand for a Scottish clan or name group with a documented former chiefship that has lapsed, as distinct from a name group that has never had a recognised chief at any point in its history. Only the former condition falls within the scope of the term as conventionally used.

This distinction is reinforced by the broader legal relationship between "clan" and "family" in Scots heraldic law. As Sir Crispin Agnew of Lochnaw has explained, the two terms become interchangeable only once a chief has been recognised by the Lord Lyon; a name group without a chief has no equivalent legal standing under either label. The status of "armigerous clan" applies only where a chief is documented to have existed and recognition has since lapsed — never to a group that has never had one.

== Restoring a chiefship ==
The Standing Council of Scottish Chiefs has cautioned against treating chiefless clans, families, or name groups as candidates for invented or constructed clan status, describing such efforts as "false history" with "no need for invention." The derbhfine and Clan Commander process exists to confirm a chiefship that is documented to have existed, not to create one. Where such a chief is documented, clan or family members can formally convene, witnessed by a representative of the Lord Lyon, in a derbhfine, and either appoint a clan chief — where evidence of a link to the chiefly line exists — or, where it does not, a clan commander to lead the search for a chief in the interim.

A clan commander may be recognised by the Lyon Court for an interim period of up to ten years, after which a further derbhfine is required; clans led by a commander remain armigerous until a chief is recognised at that point. A real-world example of this process is the Lord Lyon-authorised search in 2024 for a Clan Commander for the surnames MacDuffie, MacDuffee, MacFee, MacFie, MacPhee and related cognates. Where direct genealogical evidence of a chief already exists, this process can lead straight to recognition of a chief without an interim commander, as occurred for Clan Carruthers in 2019.

== See also ==
- Lord Lyon King of Arms
- Scottish heraldry
- List of Scottish clans
- Category:Armigerous clans
