= Parker (given name) =

- Pronunciation: PAR-ker
- Gender: Unisex
- Language: English

Origin
- Language: Old English
- Origin: Parker (surname)
- Meaning: "park keeper"
- Region of origin: England

Other names
- Related names: Park, Parke, Parkes, Parkman, Parks

Parker is an English-language unisex given name of Old English origin, meaning 'park keeper', hence also an Old English occupational surname. Parker was more common in the 19th century as a personal name than it is now. The name has variants.

== People with the given name ==
- P. O. Ackley (1903-1989), American gunsmith
- Parker Boudreaux (born 1998), American professional wrestler
- Parker Brailsford (born 2003), American football player
- Parker Burrell (1937–2010), Canadian politician
- Parker Cleaveland (1780–1858), American geologist and mineralogist
- Parker Dunshee (born 1995), American baseball player
- Parker Ehinger (born 1992), American football player
- Parker Esse, American choreographer
- Parker Fennelly (1891–1988), American actor
- Parker Finn (born 1987), American filmmaker
- Parker Frisbie (1940–2018), American sociologist
- Parker Gispert (born 1982), American singer
- Parker Griffith (born 1942), American politician
- Parker Hall (1916–2005), American football player
- Parker Watkins Hardin (1841–1920), American politician
- Parker Hesse (born 1995), American football player
- Parker Hughes (born 2003), American football player
- Parker Ighile (born 1990), British record producer, rapper, singer and songwriter
- Parker Illingworth (born 2002), Canadian rower
- Parker Ito (born 1986), American artist
- Parker Jacobs (born 1975), American artist, actor, and musician
- Parker Johnstone (born 1961), American race-car driver
- Parker Kingston, American football player
- Parker Kligerman (born 1990), American race-car driver and broadcaster
- Parker Livingstone (born 2006), American football player
- Parker MacDonald (1933–2017), Canadian ice hockey player
- Parker McCollum (born 1992), American country singer-songwriter
- Parker Lee McDonald (1924–2017), American judge
- Parker McKenzie (1897–1999), Kiowan Native American linguist
- Parker McLachlin (born 1979), American professional golfer
- Parker Millsap, American singer-songwriter and multi-instrumentalist
- Parker Mitchell, Canadian co-founder of Engineers Without Borders
- Parker Morton (1911–1995), Australian rules football player and coach
- Parker Navarro (born 2001), American college football player
- Parker Palmer (born 1939), American author, educator, and activist
- Parker Pennington (born 1984), American figure skater
- Parker Pillsbury (1809–1898), American minister and activist
- Parker Porter (born 1985), American MMA fighter
- Parker Posey (born 1968), American actress
- Parker Retzlaff (born 2003), American stock car driver
- Parker Roberts (born 1997), American soccer player
- Parker Robertson (born 2002), American football player
- Parker Stevenson (born 1952), American actor
- Parker Thompson (born 1998), Canadian race car driver
- Parker Thomson (1932–2017), American lawyer
- Parker Tyler (1904-1974), American author, poet, and film critic
- Parker Valby (born 2002), American track and field and cross-country athlete
- Parker Washington (born 2002), American football player
- Parker West, American dancer
- Parker Wickham (1727–1785), American Loyalist politician
- Parker Warren (1802–1887), American farmer and politician
- Parker Williams (1872–1958), Welsh-born politician
- Parker T. Williamson, American minister
- Parker Wolfe (born 2003), American runner
- Parker Wotherspoon (born 1997), Canadian ice hockey player
- Parker Young, American actor

== Fictional characters with the given name ==
- Parker Lewis, in TV show Parker Lewis Can't Lose
- Parker (Stark novels character)

== See also ==
- Parker (surname)
