= Parke =

Parke may refer to:

== People ==
- Benjamin Parke, 19th-century lawyer, soldier and politician in Indiana
- Ernest Parke (1860-1944), British journalist and editor
- Evan Parke, Jamaican actor
- Henry Parke (1790–1835), English architect
- Hervey Parke, Parke-Davis partner
- James Parke, 1st Baron Wensleydale, British barrister and judge
- John Parke (disambiguation), multiple people
- Maria Frances Parke (1772–1822), English composer
- Walter Parke (1891–1914), English cricketer and British Army officer
- William Parke (director) (1873–1941), American film director
- William Thomas Parke (1761–1847), English oboist

== Places ==
- Parke County, Indiana
- Parke Township, Clay County, Minnesota
- Parke, Bovey Tracey, an historic estate in Devon

== Sport ==
- Parke-Keelogues-Crimlin, also known as Parke GAA, Gaelic football club in County Mayo, Ireland

== See also ==
- Park (disambiguation)
- Parkes (disambiguation)
