= List of tartans =

List of tartan patterns

This is a list of tartans from around the world that are commonly used for Highland dress. The examples shown below are generally emblematic of a particular association. However, for each clan or family, there are often numerous other official or unofficial variations. There are also innumerable tartan designs that are not affiliated with any group but were simply created for aesthetic reasons (and which are not within the scope of this list).

== British royal and noble tartans ==
Tartans in this section are those that are (at least ostensibly) of the current or former British royal family or of individual British nobility members.

Image	Association	Origin	Notes
	House of Stuart/Stewart	Highland clans, Scottish royalty	The Royal Stuart (or Royal Stewart) tartan, first published in 1831, is the best-known tartan of the royal House of Stuart/Stewart, and is one of the most recognizable tartans. Today, it is worn by the regimental pipers of the Black Watch, Scots Guards, and Royal Scots Dragoon Guards, among other official and organisational uses. It is commonly worn by the general public as a British symbol, though in theory it is the individual property of Charles III.
	House of Stuart/Stewart	Highland clans, Scottish royalty	Another "royal" tartan of the House of Stuart/Stewart. It was referred to by George V as "my personal tartan", though it appeared in the Vestiarium Scoticum at least 23 years before his birth. While the work's historical claims have been shown to be spurious, it described the design as the "clanne Stewart tartan", and the work was popular, so the tartan would have been familiar before George's birth in 1865. It is worn officially today by the regimental pipers of the Scots Guards, and remains in common civilian use as a Stewart/Stuart clan tartan.
	Duke of Rothesay	Highland clans; Scottish royalty	The individual tartan of the Duke of Rothesay, a dynastic title of the heir-apparent to the British (and formerly separate Scottish) throne; currently Prince William.
	William Hamilton, 2nd Duke of Hamilton	Lowlands, Scottish nobility	
	Prince Charles Edward Stuart tartan	Scottish nobility	Essentially the Royal Stewart tartan but with a much-reduced red square. William Wilson & Sons of Bannockburn included it in their 1819 Key Pattern Book
	Balmoral tartan	c. 1850, reputedly designed by Prince Albert	Personal tartan of the British royal family.
	King Charles III tartan	Designed by The Scottish Tartans Authority in 2023	Personal tartan intended for the private use of His Majesty King Charles III, created in the year of his coronation. Based on the Balmoral and Duke of Rothesay tartan setts, using a muted/faded color palette matching the natural dyes of surviving 18th-century tartan specimens in historic collections. May only be woven with written permission from The Scottish Tartans Authority under instruction from the Royal Household.

== UK military or government tartans ==
A number of tartans, worn by UK military units, are known as government tartans, and are defined in a standard currently maintained by Defence Equipment and Support within the Ministry of Defence. They are known by a number, a name, or both. The commonest in regimental use today are royal Stewart (to which a number was not assigned); Government 1, Black Watch; and Government 1A, Sutherland district (a slightly lighter form of Black Watch, and specifically with a lighter green – general-public fashion use often has a lighter blue instead or in addition).

For military wear, there are official specifications for the size of the full repeat (tile) of the sett (tartan pattern), which vary by tartan (e.g. 34.5 cm × 34.5 cm for Government 1A). In kilt form, the tartans are worn with the central vertical line of the sett on the kilt's front apron running in-line with the buttons of the jacket and with the belt buckle; and the sett horizontally centred between the top of the sporran and the bottom of the belt buckle. Exactly how the kilt is pleated (knife or box pleats, and presenting which colour at the pleat edge) varies by unit.

The following table includes those government tartans worn by UK military units as from the 2006 creation of the Royal Regiment of Scotland onwards. Some other units may wear a named clan tartan without it being defined by this standard; these are covered in a second table below. For the Royal Regiment of Scotland, the pipes and drums in each battalion wear the uniform of their antecedent regiment (as listed below) for ceremonial dress purposes, but the Royal Regiment's standard Government 1A for non-ceremonial (and non-combat) undress purposes.

Image	Number	Name	Current units worn by; notes
Image of Black Watch tartan	1	Black Watch or "Government"	Black Watch, 3rd Battalion, Royal Regiment of Scotland (3 Scots) drummers and drum major; inherited in succession from Black Watch (Royal Highlanders), Black Watch (Royal Highland Regiment), and 42nd Regiment of Foot. The tartan is also among the most common in civilian use, under various names like old Campbell, hunting Grant, hunting Munro, etc. (often somewhat lightened).
Image of Government 1A tartan	1A	Sutherland district	Royal Regiment of Scotland (1–7 Scots) including bands (undress, aside from combat-order fatigues; kilts or trews, depending on climate and duties) 51st Highland Volunteers (7 Scots) drummers and drum major; inherited from Argyll and Sutherland Highlanders. A partially lightened version of Black Watch (No. 1). Though named "Sutherland", this light-green version is particular to regimental use; civilian use of Sutherland district tartan is generally with light blue instead. It is also unrelated to the Clan Sutherland tartan.
Image of Gordon tartan	3	Gordon	Formerly worn by the Gordon Highlanders.
	4	Cameron of Erracht	Highlanders (4 Scots) pipers, pipe major, drummers, and drum major; inherited from the Highlanders (Seaforth, Gordons and Camerons) pipers and drummers.
	5A (formerly 2)	MacKenzie	Royal Highland Fusiliers (2 Scots) drum major and duty bugler (trews); inherited from Royal Scots Fusiliers and Highland Light Infantry (City of Glasgow Regiment) upon their amalgamation.
	6	Douglas	Royal Gurkha Rifles pipers (trews and plaids); inherited from 7th Duke of Edinburgh's Own Gurkha Rifles.
	7	Leslie	Former Royal Scots Borderers (1 Scots) drummers (trews); disbanded in 2021; inherited from King's Own Scottish Borderers.
	8 (or 8A)	Hunting Stewart	Former Royal Scots Borderers (1 Scots) drum major (trews); disbanded in 2021; inherited from Royal Scots. Tayforth UOTC, including in kilt form inherited from the Dandy Ninth.
	9	Forbes	
	11	Red Erskine	Royal Highland Fusiliers (2 Scots) pipers, pipe major, and drummers
		Royal Stewart	Black Watch (3 Scots) pipers and pipe major 51st Highland Volunteers (7 Scots) pipers and pipe major Scots Guards pipers Royal Scots Dragoon Guards pipers Former Royal Scots Borderers (1 Scots) pipers and pipe major; disbanded in 2021.
		Hunting Rose	Royal Tank Regiment pipes and drums, and officers in black-tie

A number of other tartans are, since 2014, no longer listed as official uniform material by the Defence Clothing (DC) division of the Ministry of Defence, and "DC do not purchase or hold any of the cloth", but remain in use by some units' pipe bands and may be permitted for some other uses, such as uniform cap cockades, though are "unfunded" (must be provided by the units out of their own budgets). No. 1A was listed among these no-longer-official tartans in 2014, but in 2019 was included in the official tartans of the entire Royal Regiment of Scotland, so something clearly changed during that period.

Image	Number	Name	Current units worn by; notes
	15	Red Grant	32nd Signal Regiment bandsmen; also used for the diamond-shaped cockade backing the badge on the regular uniform cap. Royal Corps of Signals pipers The regimental version of this tartan differs somewhat from the clan version.
	16	Red MacDuff	154 (Scottish) Regiment RLC pipers and drummers; also used for the diamond-shaped cockade backing the badge on the regular uniform cap. The regimental version of this tartan differs somewhat from the clan version. Another tartan was created in 2018 (approved in 2020) in honour of the Royal Logistic Corps, but it is for civilian use and is a fundraiser for the RLC's MoD Benevolent fund; it is not used for regimental uniform.
	18	Red Robertson	
	19	Hunting Fraser	
	22	MacDonald of the Isles	
	23	MacDonald of Keppoch	
		Hunting Robertson	19th Regiment Royal Artillery bandsmen
		Murray of Atholl	Fife and Forfar Yeomanry/Scottish Horse (C Squadron of the Queen's Own Yeomanry); inherited from the original Scottish Horse.

It is unclear from available official documentation what tartans (ones apparently no longer in British military use at all) correspond to the serial numbers now missing from the specifications: 5, 10, 12, 13, 14, 17, 20, 21, 23, 24, and 25.

== Scottish clan tartans ==
The tartans in this list are those ascribed to particular clans of Scotland, including Highland, Lowland, Isles, and Borders clans. Their statuses vary widely; armigerous clans generally accept them, while some have been officially adopted or rejected by a clan chief, which may often include tartans made for certain districts.

Image	Association	Origin	Notes
	Abercromby	Lowland clans	
	Agnew	Lowland clans	
	Ainslie		
	Aiton	Lowland clans	
	Anderson		Shared with Clan Gillanders
	Anstruther	Lowland clans	Also known as Duke of Fife tartan, shared with clans Beveridge, Ged, Kinloch, Kinnear, Lundin, Primrose, Balfour, Boswell and Kirkcaldy
	Arbuthnott	Lowland clans	
	Armstrong	Borders clans	
	Arnott		
	Arthur	Highland clans	Also known as "MacArthur"; has an additional tartan called "Milton".
	Baillie		
	Bain		
	Baird		
	Balfour	Lowland clans	
	Barclay	Lowland clans	
	Baxter		
	Bell	Borders clans	Also known as "Bell of the Borders"
	Bethune	Lowland clans	Also known as "MacBeth", shared with Clan McBain
	Bissett	Lowland clans	
	Blackadder		Also known as "Tweedside District", shared with clans Blyth, Learmonth, Spottiswood, Swinton and Boswell
	Blackstock		
	Blair	Lowland clans	
	Borthwick	Lowland clans	
	Boswell	Lowland clans	
	Boyd	Lowland clans	Shared with clans Fairlie and Fullarton
	Brodie	Lowland clans	
	Broun	Lowland clans	
	Bruce	Lowland clans	Shared with clans Carruthers and Crosbie, and second set of tartans shared with Clan Kinnaird
	Buchan		
	Buchanan	Highland clans	The primary Buchanan tartan is known for its asymmetrical design dominated by yellow and red. A symmetrical version called "Buchanan old sett" exists (the asymmetrical version being blamed on an error Logan & McIan's Clans of the Scottish Highlands, 1843). Several other tartans are recognised by the clan association, which also rejects a number of others that have been invented by weavers or which originated in the Vestiarium Scoticum of 1842.
	Cameron	Highland clans	Cameron of Erracht variant shared with Clan Chalmers
	Campbell	Highland clans	Image is the so called "Old Campbell" which is a lighter form of the Black Watch regimental tartan, adopted by Clan Campbell, and shared with clans Bannatyne, Lyon and Paterson
	Campbell of Breadalbane	Highland clans	Second set of tartans, shared with Clan Paterson
	Campbell of Cawdor	Highland clans	Shared with clans Calder and McCorquodale
	Carmichael	Lowland clans	
	Carnegie	Lowland clans	
	Carruthers	Lowland/Borders clans	
	Charteris	Lowland clans	Also known as "Roxburgh", shared with clans Belshes, Riddell, Ainslie, Rutherford and Haig
	Chattan	Confederation of highland clans	Based on Mackintosh Chief, shared with clans Davidson, Farquharson, MacBean, MacGillivray, MacIntyre, MacKintosh, MacLean, MacPhail, MacPherson, MacQueen, MacThomas, and Shaw as its members
	Chisholm	Highland clans	
	Clelland		
	Cochrane	Lowland clans	
	Colquhoun	Lowland clans	Shared with clans Kirkpatrick and Laing
	Colville	Lowland clans	Also known as "Ayrshire District", shared with clans Dalrymple, Whitelaw and Arnott, and second set of tartans shared with Clan Boswell
	Cooper	Lowland clans	
	Craig	Lowland clans	
	Cranstoun	Borders clans	
	Crawford	Lowland clans	
	Crichton	Lowland clans	Also known as "Edinburgh District", shared with clans Newton, Preston, Spalding, Trotter and Moubray
	Crosbie	Lowland clans	
	Cumming	Lowland clans	Also known as "Comyn"; shared with Clan Cheyne
	Cunningham	Lowland clans	Has additional dancer tartans.
	Dalziel	Lowland clans	
Davidson, Modern	Davidson	Highland clans	
	Donald	Highland clans	Also known as "MacDonald", shared with branches Dunnyveg and Largie, as well as clans Boyle, Heron, MacColl, Smith, Bissett, Houston and Kelly
	Douglas	Lowland clans	Shared with clans Glen, Glendinning, Sandilands, Troup, and Blackstock, and second set of tartans shared with Clan Kirkpatrick
	Drummond	Lowland clans	Shared with Clan Grewar
	Dunbar	Lowland clans	
	Duncan	Lowland clans	Also known as "Leslie of Wardis"
	Dundas	Lowland clans	
	Dunlop		
	Edmonstone	Lowland clans	
	Elliot	Borders clans	
	Elphinstone	Lowland clans	
	Erskine	Lowland clans	
	Ewing	Highland clans	
	Farquharson	Highland clans	Shared with Clan Christie, second set of tartans shared with Clan Lyon, and third set of tartans shared with Clan Paterson
	Fergusson	Highland and Lowland	
	Fletcher	Highland clans	
	Forbes	Lowland clans	Shared with Clan Bannerman
	Forrester	Lowland clans	
	Forsyth	Lowland clans	
	Fraser	Lowland clans	Shared with clans Abernethy and Tweedie, and second set of tartans shared with clans Grewar and Bissett
	Fraser of Lovat	Highland clans	
	Galbraith	Lowland clans	Also known as "Mitchell", shared with clans Hunter and Russell
	Galloway		Shared with clans Aikenhead, Blane, Clephane, Horsburgh, Newlands, McGeachie, Pringle and McKerrell, and second set of tartans shared with Clan Boyle
	Gardyne	Lowland clans	Also known as "Garden" and "Angus", shared with Clan Maule, and second set of tartans shared with Clan Horsburgh
	Gayre	Highland (proposed)	
	Gibbs	Lowland clans	
	Gordon	Borders clans	Shared with clans Adam and Brisbane, and second set of tartans shared with clans Laing and Mar
	Gow		
	Graham	Borders clans	"Graham of Montrose" variant shared with Clan Allardice, "Graham of Menteith" variants shared with Clan Haldane, and both shared with Clan Pitcairn
	Grant	Highland clans	Shared with Clan Cairns, second set of tartans shared with Clan Heron, and third set of tartans shared with Clan Bissett
	Gray		
	Gregor	Highland clans	Also known as "MacGregor"; Shared with clans Grierson, Bain and Strange, and third set of tartans shared with Clan Grewar
	Grewar		
	Gunn	Highland clans	
	Guthrie		
	Haig	Lowland clans	
	Hamilton	Lowland clans	
	Hannay	Lowland clans	
	Hay	Lowland clans	Also known as "Leith"
	Henderson	Highland and Lowland	
	Hepburn		
	Home	Borders clans	Shared with clans Wedderburn and Aiton, and second set of tartans shared with Clan Rutherford
	Hope	Lowland clans	
	Houston		
	Hutton	Lowland clans	Also known as "Strathclyde District", shared with clans Roberton and Muirhead
	Inglis		
	Innes	Highland clans	Second set of tartans shared with Clan Masterton
	Irvine		
	Jardine	Lowland clans	Shared with Clan Gardyne
	Johnstone	Borders clans	Sometimes also rendered Johnson, though this surname often has non-Scottish origins; shared with Clan Marjoribanks
	Keith	Highland and Lowland	Shared with clans Falconer and Mercer
	Kelly		
	Kennedy	Lowland clans	
	Kerr	Borders clans	
	Kincaid		
	Kinnaird		
	Kinninmont		Also known as "Nithsdale District"
	Kirkcaldy		
	Laing		
	Lamont	Highland clans	Shared with Clan Lammie, and fourth set of tartans shared with Clan Paterson
	Leask	Highland clans	
	Lennox	Lowland clans	Shared with Clan Gartshore
	Leslie	Lowland clans	Second set of tartans shared with Clan Abernethy, and third set of tartans shared with Clan Laing
	Lindsay	Lowland clans	Shared with clans Auchinleck and Byres
	Little	Borders clans	
	Lockhart	Lowland clans	
	Logan	Highland and Lowland	Shared with Clan MacLennan
	Lumsden	Lowland/Borders	
	Lyon	Lowland clans	
	MacAlister	Highland clans	
	MacAulay	Highland clans	Third set of tartans shared with Clan Lyon, and fifth set of tartans shared with Clan Paterson
	MacBean	Highland clans	Shared with Clan Binning, and second set of tartans shared with Clan McBain
	MacColl		
	MacDonald of Clanranald	Highland clans	
	MacDonald of Keppoch	Highland clans	
	MacDonald of Sleat	Highland clans	Shared with Clan Darroch, and second set of tartans shared with clans MacColl, Houston and Kelly
	MacDonnell of Glengarry	Highland clans	
	MacDougall	Highland clans	Shared with Clan MacDowall
	MacDowall	Lowland clans	
	MacDuff	Highland clans	Shared with Clan Spens
	MacEwan	Highland clans	
	MacFarlane	Highland clans	
	Macfie	Highland clans	Also known as "MacPhee".
	MacGillivray	Highland clans	
	MacInnes	Highland clans	Third set of tartans shared with Clan Masterton
	MacIntyre	Highland clans	
	MacIver		
	MacKay	Highland clans	Shared with Clan Mackie, and second set of tartans shared with Clan Bain
	Mackenzie	Highland clans	
	Mackinnon	Highland clans	
	Mackintosh	Highland clans	Shared with clans Nairn and MacThomas
	MacLachlan	Highland clans	
	Maclaine of Lochbuie	Highland clans	
	MacLaren	Highland clans	Fourth set of tartans shared with Clan Lyon, and sixth set of tartans shared with Clan Paterson
	MacLea	Highland clans	Shared with Clan Livingstone
	MacLean	Highland clans	Second set of tartans shared with Clan Gillon
	MacLellan	Lowland clans	
	MacLeod	Highland clans	Also known as "McLeod of Harris", second set of tartans shared with Clan McCorquodale
	MacLeod of Assynt	Highland clans	Third set of tartans shared with Clan McCorquodale
	MacLeod of Lewis	Highland clans	Fourth set of tartans shared with Clan McCorquodale
	MacLeod of Raasay	Highland clans	Fifth set of tartans shared with Clan McCorquodale
	MacMillan	Highland clans	Shared with Clan Baxter
	Macnab	Highland clans	
	Macnaghten	Highland and Lowland	
	MacNeacail	Isle of Skye	Also known as "MacNicol"; shared with clans Nicolson and Cunningham
	MacNeil	Highland clans	Formally known as "MacNeil of Barra"; has an additional tartan currently not recognized by the current chief as a clan tartan.
	MacNeil of Colonsay	Highland clans	
	MacPhail	Highland clans	
	Macpherson	Highland clans	
	MacQuarrie	Highland clans	
	Macqueen	Highland clans	Image shows both Macqueen tartan setts. The black-red-yellow is better known while the blue-red-yellow is considered to be an "artifact variant".
	Macrae	Highland clans	
	MacTavish	Highland clans	Thompson/Thomson/MacTavish (STWR Reference – 228)- Easily confused with "Ancient MacTavish Red" as they are all but identical.
	MacThomas	Highland clans	
	Maitland	Lowland clans	
	Makgill	Lowland clans	Also known as "MacGill"
	Malcolm	Highland and Lowland	Has an additional tartan called "MacCallum"
	Mar	Lowland clans	Has an additional tartan known as "Don".
	Marjoribanks	Lowland clans	
	Matheson	Highland clans	
	Maxwell	Borders clans	Shared with clans Adair, Herries, Maxton and Pollock, and second set of tartans shared with Clan Blackstock
	McAlpine	Highland clans	
	McCulloch	Lowland clans	
	McGeachie		
	McKerrell	Lowland clans	
	Melville	Lowland clans	
	Menzies	Highland clans	
	Mercer		
	Middleton	Lowland clans	
	Moffat	Lowland clans	
	Moncreiffe	Highland clans	
	Montgomery	Lowland clans	
	Morrison	Highland and Lowland	
	Mouat		
	Moubray	Lowland clans	
	Muir	Highland clans	Also known as "More"; The California State tartan, seen below, is also based on this pattern.
	Muirhead		
	Munro	Highland clans	
	Murray	Highland clans	
	Murray of Atholl	Highland clans	Shared with Clan Fleming, and second set of tartans shared with Clan Spalding
	Nairn		
	Napier	Lowland clans	
	Nesbitt	Borders clans	
	Newlands	Lowland clans	
	Ochterlony	Lowland clans	
	Ogilvy	Highland clans	Shared with Clan Kinnaird
	Oliphant	Highland clans	
	Paisley		Shared with clans Cathcart, Walkinshaw and Ralston, and second set of tartans shared with Clan Brisbane
	Paterson		Has an additional tartan known as "MacKellar"
	Pitcairn		
	Pollock	Lowland clans	
	Pringle	Borders clans	
	Ralston	Lowland clans	Currently the only Scottish clan to have additional American and Universal tartans.
	Ramsay	Lowland clans	
	Rattray	Highland clans	
	Robertson	Highland clans	Also known as "Donnachaidh/Donnachie"
	Rollo	Lowland clans	
	Rose	Highland clans	
	Ross	Highland clans	Shared with Clan Lockhart, and second set of tartans shared with Clan Gillanders
	Rutherford	Lowland/Borders	
	Ruthven	Lowland clans	
	Scott	Borders clans	
	Scrymgeour	Highland clans	
	Sempill	Lowland clans	
	Seton	Lowland clans	
	Shaw	Highland clans	Shared with Clan Schaw
	Sinclair	Lowland clans	
	Skene	Lowland clans	
	Smith		
	Somerville		
	Stewart/Stuart	Highland and Lowland	Shared with Clan Lyle, and third set of tartans shared with Clan Heron
	Stewart of Appin	Highland clans	
	Stirling	Lowland clans	Also known as "Bannockburn", second set of tartans shared with Clan Aikenhead
	Strachan	Highland clans	
	Straiton	Lowland clans	Also known as "Perthshire District", shared with Clan Butter, and second set of tartans shared with clans Arnott, Balfour, Mercer, Maule and Spens
	Strange	Lowland clans	
	Stuart of Bute	Highland clans	
	Sutherland	Highland clans	
	Tailyour		
	Tait		
	Tennant		
	Thomson		
	Turnbull	Borders clans	
	Udny		Also known as "Aberdeen District", shared with Clan Straiton, and second set of tartans shared with Clan Pitblado
	Urquhart	Lowland clans	
	Wallace	Lowland clans	Also known as "Wallace Red", and is also notably used on the 3M brand Scotch tape.
	Wardlaw		
	Watson	Lowland clans	
	Weir	Lowland clans	Shared with Clan Hope
	Wemyss	Lowland clans	
	Wishart		
	Wood	Lowland clans	Incorporates the colors of the Duke of Fife and Angus district tartans – areas with which the Woods are historically connected.
	Young	Borders clans	

== Scottish non-clan family tartans ==
Tartans in this list are ascribed to specific families or surnames, though not to Scottish clans; they range in date from 21st century to considerably older.

Image	Association	Origin	Notes
	Burnett	Lowland and Borders	
	Cockburn	Lowlands	
	Drennan	Renfrewshire, Ayrshire, and Lanarkshire	Registered with STA pre-2002 (no. 4710) and SRT in 2002 (no. 975). Designed in 1952.
	Durie	Lowlands	
	Inchforth	Lothian	Registered with SRT in 2012 (no. 10575). A fresh and contemporary tartan design woven and manufactured as an alternative to the Menzies clan tartan for family & corporate purposes. The chosen colours are intended as a nod to Scottish-Irish familial links.
	Lauder		Shared with Clan Maitland
	McCandlish	Galloway (Wigtownshire, Kirkcudbrightshire), and Ayrshire	Registered with STA in 1992 (no. 3324) and SRT in 2009 (no. 5216). Also exists in green, grey, and arisaid (white-field) variants.
	Oliver	Borders area	
	Park		
	Rainey	Angus, Scotland or County Antrim/County Down	Registered with Scottish Register of Tartans on 15 October 2024 (no. 14511).

== Organisational tartans ==
Tartans in this list are modern ones pertaining to particular commercial and non-profit organisations.

Image	Association	Origin	Country	Notes
	Burberry	Company design	England	Created in the 1920s, this pattern is known as the "Burberry check". It was originally used as a lining in the company's trench coats.
	Clan McDuck	Disney	United States	Created in 1942 for Donald Duck universe/Duck Family features, possible "#1 variant."
	Clan DunBroch/Merida	Disney	United States	Created for the 2012 film Brave
	Scouting movement	Clan MacLaren	Worldwide	For use with Wood Badge

== Regional tartans ==
Tartans in these lists were created (mostly in modern times) for particular national and sub-national jurisdictions, most often officially, though with some exceptions.

=== Ireland ===
The most traditionally associated tartan worn in Ireland is the plain saffron tartan, however, additional Irish tartans were created to represent Irish surnames, as well as its provinces and counties.

=== United States ===
The United States of America has tartans for certain states and cities, as well as tartans that represent each branch and select units of the U.S. Armed Forces, in a similar manner to the British government.

Image	Association	Origin	Country	Notes
	US Air Force Reserve Pipe Band	Strathmore Woollen Company	United States	Adopted by the band in the early 1990s. Although it has no official US Military recognition, it has been widely accepted by US servicemen with Air Force connections. Originally created in 1988 as Lady Jane of St Cirus. A variation of this is named US Forces Thurso.

=== Wales ===
Beginning in the 21st century, tartans were created in Wales to mainly represent traditionally Welsh family surnames similar to Scotland and Ireland, also through the traditional wearing of "cilts", as the letter k is non-existent in the Welsh alphabet.

== See also ==
- Border tartan
- Jewish tartans
- Scottish Register of Tartans
- Scottish Tartans Authority
- Vestiarium Scoticum § Tartans – tables of tartans listed in this antique but questionably accurate manuscript, with the addition of thread counts and Scottish Tartans Society designations
