= Park Town =

Park Town or Parktown may refer to:

- Park Town, Chennai, India
  - Park Town (State Assembly Constituency), India
- Park Town, Oxford, Oxfordshire, England
- Parktown, a suburb of Johannesburg
- HMSAS Parktown, two ships of the South African navy

== See also ==
- Park Township (disambiguation)
