= William Park =

William Park may refer to:

- William Hallock Park (1863–1939), American bacteriologist and laboratory director
- William A. Park (1853–1924), lawyer and political figure in New Brunswick
- William W. Park (born 1947), professor of law at Boston University School of Law
- Rev. William Park, chairman (2007–09) of the creationist Caleb Foundation
- William Park (footballer) (1919–2016), English professional footballer

== See also ==
- Bill Park (born 1952), Canadian swimming coach and swimmer
- William Parke (disambiguation)
- Willie Park (disambiguation)
- William Parks (disambiguation)
