= Park (disambiguation) =

A park is an area of land with a recreational or other specific purpose.

Park or Parks may also refer to:

== Places ==
=== United Kingdom ===
- Park (Barnet ward), London, England
- Park (Greenwich ward), London, England
- Park (Haringey ward), London, England
- Park (Kingston upon Thames ward), London, England
- Park (Lincoln ward), Lincolnshire, England
- Park (Newham ward), London, England
- Park (Reading ward), Berkshire, England
- Park (Redbridge ward), London, England
- Park (Richmond upon Thames ward), London, England
- Park (Sefton ward), Merseyside, England
- Park (Trafford ward), Manchester, England
- Park (Tunbridge Wells ward), Kent, England
- Park (Tower Hamlets ward), London, England
- Park (Windsor and Maidenhead ward), Berkshire, England
- Park (Wolverhampton ward), West Midlands, England
- Park, County Londonderry, a village in Northern Ireland
- Park, Lewis, an area of land in the Outer Hebrides, Scotland
- Park, Merthyr Tydfil, a community and electoral ward in Wales
- Park, a townland in County Antrim, Northern Ireland
- The Parks, Oxford, a parkland area and cricket venue in Oxford, England

=== United States ===
- Park, Indiana
- Park, Kansas
- Park, Kentucky
- Park, Texas
- Park, Washington
- Parks, Arizona, a census-designated place
- Parks, Louisiana, a village
- Parks, Missouri, a ghost town
- Parks, Nebraska, an unincorporated community
- Sly Park, California, formerly called Park, California

=== Elsewhere ===
- Park, Afghanistan
- Park, a townland in County Laois, Ireland
- Park, Warmian-Masurian Voivodeship, Poland
- Park, Yazd, Iran
- 5585 Parks, an asteroid
- Park Abbey, Belgium

== People ==
=== As a surname ===
- Park (Korean surname)
- Park (English surname)
- Parks (surname)

=== As a given name ===
- Park Laurie (in full James Park Dawson Laurie, 1846–1928), South Australian politician

=== Fictional characters ===
- Chi Park, from the American medical drama TV series House
- Chyna, Cameron, and Daryl Parks from the American teen sitcom A.N.T. Farm
- Helen Park, from the 2020 video game Call of Duty: Black Ops Cold War
- Ricky "Jupe" Park, from the 2022 science fiction horror film Nope
- Willow Park, from the 2020 animated fantasy series The Owl House
- Zane Park, from the Canadian teen drama Degrassi: The Next Generation

== Arts, entertainment, and media ==
=== Films ===
- Park (2007 film), an American romantic comedy starring William Baldwin and Cheri Oteri
- Park (2016 film), a Greek-Polish film
- Park (2024 film), an Indian Tamil film

=== Music ===
- Park (album), the sixth album from The Mad Capsule Markets
- Park (band), an American punk rock band
- "Park" (song), by Tyler Hubbard

== Brands and enterprises ==
- Park, a brand of amplifiers built by Jim Marshall of Marshall Amplification, 1965–1982
- Park Tool Company, a manufacturer of professional bicycle tools

== Vehicles ==
- Parking
- Parking pawl, the park position of an automatic transmission

== Other uses ==
- Parks College, Oxford, a proposed graduate college of the University of Oxford
- Pärk, a game somewhat similar to baseball from the island of Gotland in Baltic Sea
- Park, a 6-row malting barley variety
- Parks (board game)
- Types of places called "park(s)":
  - Amusement park
  - Baseball park, also ballpark or diamond, a type of sporting venue where baseball is played
  - Business park, or office park, an area allocated for the development and operation of office buildings and light industry
  - Car park, or parking lot
  - Deer park (England), a protected living space for deer
  - Industrial park, an area allocated for industrial development, typically that of heavy industry rather than light industry
  - Involuntary park, an area formerly inhabited or developed by humans that has since fallen into disuse, permitting for reclamation by plants and animals
  - Landscape park (protected area), a protected area of lower status than a national park
  - National park, a reserve of land protected from most human development and pollution
  - Science park
  - Skatepark

== See also ==
- The Park (disambiguation)
- Park Avenue (disambiguation)
- Park City (disambiguation)
- Park County (disambiguation)
- Park Hotel (disambiguation)
- Parkland (disambiguation)
- Park Road (disambiguation)
- Park Township (disambiguation)
- Parke (disambiguation)
- Parkes (disambiguation)
- Parker (disambiguation)
