= Park (English surname) =

Park is an English and Scottish surname. Notable people with the surname include:

- Barbara Park (1947–2013), American author of children's books
- Charlotte Park (1918–2010), American painter
- Craig Park (born 1986), South African cricketer
- Daphne Park (1921–2010), British spy
- Denise C. Park (1951-2026), American neuroscientist
- Emily Hendree Stewart Park (1848–1910), American school president
- Harry Jonathan Park (1868–1927), American businessman and politician
- James Park (disambiguation), multiple people
- John Park (disambiguation), multiple people
- John Mungo-Park (1918–1941), Royal Air Force fighter pilot and flying ace of the Second World War
- Joseph Park (born 1973), former wrestler, better known as Abyss
- Keith Park (1892–1975), New Zealand air force commander
- Keith Park (footballer) (1920–1994), Australian rules footballer
- Lar Park Lincoln (1961–2025), American actress
- Maria Hester Park (1760–1813), Born as Maria Hester Reynolds, British composer, pianist, and singer
- Michael Park (actor) (born 1968), American actor
- Mungo Park (explorer) (1771–1806), Scottish explorer
- Mungo Park (golfer) (1836–1904), Scottish golfer
- Nick Park (born 1958), English animator and director
- Nigel Park (1921–1942), New Zealand flying ace of the Second World War
- Owain Park (born 1993), English composer and conductor
- Ray Park (born 1974), Scottish actor, author and martial artist
- Robert E. Park (1864–1944), American urban sociologist
- Robert L. Park (1931–2020), American physicist and pseudo-science critic
- W. Anthony Park (1934–2025), American politician and attorney in Idaho
- William Hallock Park (1863–1939), American bacteriologist

== See also ==
- Park (disambiguation)
- Park (Korean surname)
- Parks (surname)
