= William Parke =

William Parke may refer to:

- William Parke (British Army officer), British general
- William Parke (director), American film director
- William Thomas Parke, English oboist and composer

== See also ==
- William Park (disambiguation)
