= Thomas Park =

English antiquary and bibliographer

Thomas Park (1759–1834) was an English antiquary and bibliographer, also known as a literary editor.

== Life ==
He was the son of parents who lived at East Acton, Middlesex. When ten years old he was sent to a grammar school at Heighington, County Durham, and remained there for more than five years.

He was brought up as an engraver, and produced mezzotint portraits, including John Thomas, bishop of Rochester, and Penelope Boothby, after Sir Joshua Reynolds; Mrs. Jordan as the Comic Muse, after John Hoppner; and a Magdalen after Ubaldo Gandolfi. In 1797 he abandoned this career, and devoted himself to literature and the study of antiquities. In London he lived in turn in Piccadilly; Marylebone High Street, where Richard Heber used to drink tea two or three times a week; Durweston Street, Portman Square; and Hampstead, where he was involved with local charities.

On 11 March 1802 he was admitted as a Fellow of the Society of Antiquaries; but he resigned in 1815 for financial reasons. He sold his books to Thomas Hill (1760–1840), with the condition that he could still consult them. Later they went to Longmans, and, after being catalogued by A. F. Griffiths in Bibliotheca Anglo-Poetica were dispersed by sale. He edited many works, and assisted leading antiquaries in their researches.

He was elected a member of the American Antiquarian Society in 1821.

Park died at Church Row, Hampstead, where he had resided for thirty years, on 26 November 1834, aged 75.

== Works ==
Park wrote:

- ‘Sonnets and other small Poems,’ 1797. In 1792 he had made the acquaintance of William Cowper, who encouraged him to publish, and his compositions were corrected by Anna Seward; but Robert Southey laughed at his pretensions. Many of the sonnets in this volume were written on scenes in Kent, Sussex, and Hertfordshire.
- 'Cupid turned Volunteer. A series of prints designed by the Princess Elizabeth and engraved by W. N. Gardiner. With poetical illustrations by Thomas Park,' 1804. Engravings of William Nelson Gardiner.
- 'Epitaphial Lines on Interment of Princess Charlotte,' Lee Priory Press, 20 November 1817. Sir Egerton Brydges printed at this press in 1815 some verses to Park.
- 'Nugæ Modernæ Morning Thoughts and Midnight Musings,' 1818.
- 'Advantages of Early Rising,' 1824.
- 'Solacing Verses for Serious Times,' 1832.

He also wrote some cards of 'Christian Remembrance: a Plain Clue to the Gospel of Peace.’ Park's name is included in John Julian's Hymnology for his hymn "My soul, praise the Lord; speak good of His name".

Several poetical articles were supplied by him for John Nichols's 'Progresses of Queen Elizabeth;' some of his notes and illustrations were added to W. C. Hazlitt's edition of Diana, Sonnets and other Poems, by Henry Constable, 1859; and he was a contributor to the Gentleman's Magazine and the Monthly Mirror. Letters to and from him are printed in several places. Cowper's letters to him, originally printed in the 'Monthly Mirror,' were in Southey's edition of the Life and Correspondence of Cowper.

== Editor ==
Southey praised Park to Longmans as the best editor for the Bibliotheca Britannica which they projected. Among the works which he edited were:

- Books for the "mental culture and moral guidance of youth", printed by a bookseller called Sael, who died in 1799.
- ‘Nugæ Antiquæ, a collection of papers by Sir John Harington, selected by Henry Harington, 1804, 2 vols.
- John Sharpe's Works of the British Poets, 1805–8, forty-two volumes, with a supplement in six more volumes.
- John Dryden's Fables from Boccaccio and Chaucer, 1806, 2 vols.
- Horace Walpole's Royal and Noble Authors, Enlarged and Continued, 1806, 5 vols.
- Harleian Miscellany, 1808–1813, in ten volumes, two of which were supplements from Park's collections.
- Reliques of Ancient English Poetry, by Bishop Thomas Percy, 5th edit. 1812. 3 vols.
- Thomas Cooke's Translation of Hesiod for the "Greek and Roman Poets", 1813.
- Joseph Ritson's Select Collections of English Songs, with their Original Airs, 2nd edit. with additional songs and occasional notes, 1813, 3 vols.
- Heliconia: a Selection of English Poetry between 1575 and 1604, 1815, 3 vols. John Payne Collier, when announcing a new issue of England's Parnassus, commented severely on the edition in Heliconia.

Park is sometimes said to have been associated with Edward Dubois in editing, in 1817, the works in two volumes of Sir John Mennes and James Smith, and there was reprinted at the Lee Priory Press in 1818 under his editorship a volume called The Trumpet of Fame, written by H. R. 1595.

Park's assistance was acknowledged by Sir Egerton Brydges in the Restituta (vol. iv. p. xi), and in prefaces to the volumes of the Censura Literaria. He helped George Ellis in his various collections of poetry and romance; he aided Joseph Ritson in the Bibliographia Poetica and the unpublished Bibliographia Scotica, though their friendly relationship was broken off before Ritson's death; and George Steevens, when engaged in editing Shakespeare, called on him for advice and information. At one time he planned to edit Thomas Warton's History of English Poetry; his notes were added to the 1824 edition of that work, and were incorporated under their proper headings in the 1840 edition.

Robert Bloomfield, the ploughboy poet, was introduced to him, and he superintended the publication, and corrected the various editions, of Bloomfield's Poems. He also helped the posthumous reputation of Henry Kirke White.

== Family ==
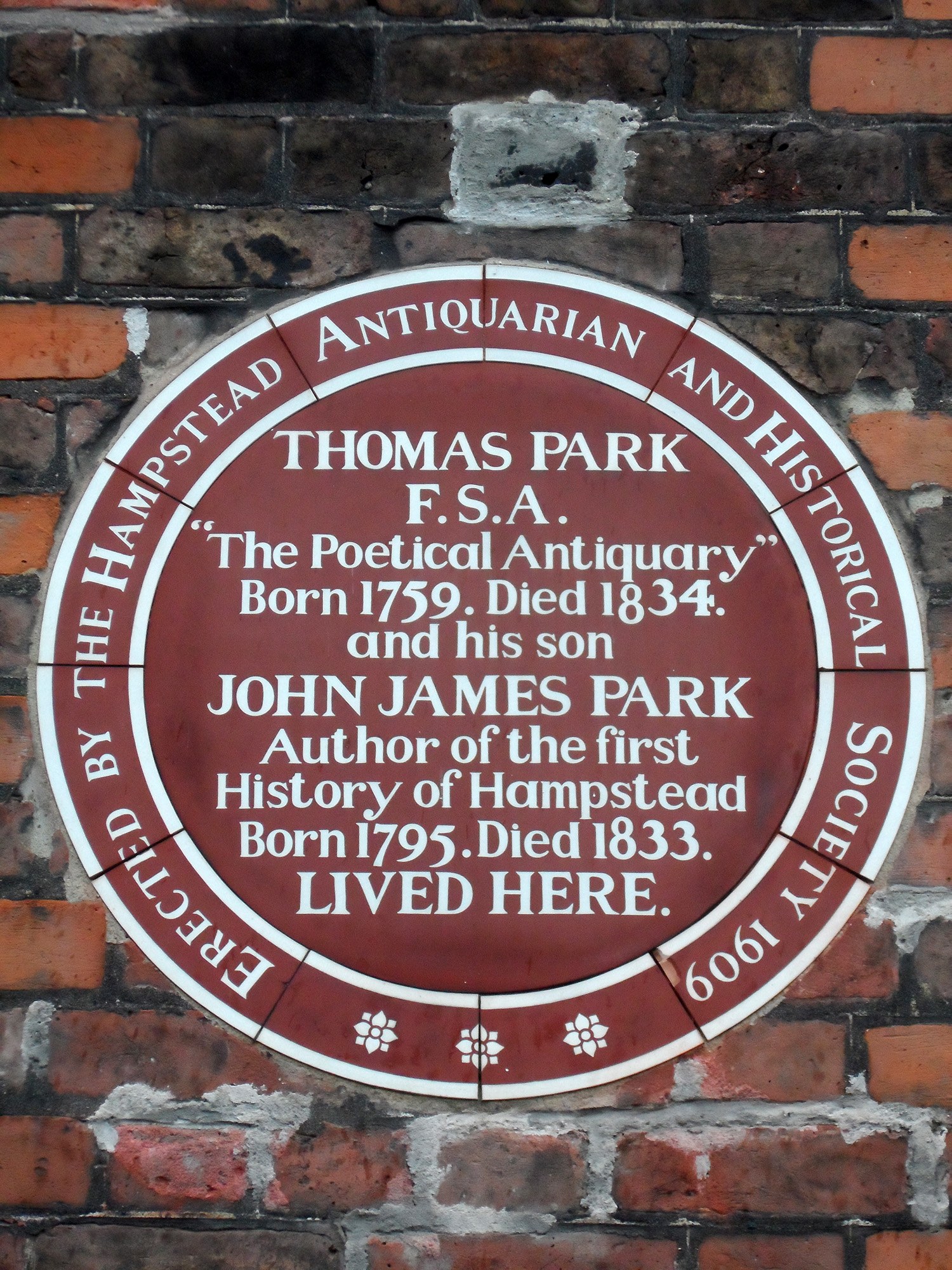
Brown plaque erected in 1909 by the Hampstead Antiquarian and Historical Society at 18 Church Row, Hampstead

His only son John James Park died young in June 1833. He left four daughters, the survivors of a large family. His wife Maria Hester Park who long suffered from ill-health, died at Hampstead on 7 June 1813, aged 52. (She must be distinguished from Maria Frances Parke, married name Mrs. Beardmore, a singer and musical composer, daughter of John Parke.)

== Notes ==
Attribution

This article incorporates text from a publication now in the public domain: "Park, Thomas". Dictionary of National Biography. London: Smith, Elder & Co. 1885–1900.
