= John Parke (oboist) =

English oboist

John Parke (1745 – 2 August 1829) was an English oboist, performing at prominent concerts of the day.

== Life ==
He was born in 1745; William Thomas Parke, also an oboist, was his younger brother. John Parke studied the oboe under Simpson, and musical theory under Charles Frederick Baumgarten. In 1768 he was appointed principal oboe at the King's Theatre; in the same year he played at the first Birmingham festival, and also at the Three Choirs Festival in Hereford. He continued to perform at the Three Choirs Festivals for thirty-five years.

In 1768 Johann Christian Fischer, an oboist from Dresden, first came to London: his performances stimulated Parke to greater ambition, and he improved his style; two years later he succeeded Fischer as concerto player at Vauxhall Gardens. In 1771 he accepted an offer from David Garrick to become first oboe at Drury Lane Theatre. He was also engaged by John Christopher Smith and John Stanley as a principal at the Lenten oratorios, and in the summer he played at Ranelagh Gardens and Vauxhall Gardens.

The Duke of Cumberland took Parke into his band, led by Baumgarten, in 1783, and the Prince of Wales employed him at his Carlton House concerts, with a salary of £100. He was a prominent performer at the Concerts of Antient Music, the Professional Concerts, and other concerts. He composed some oboe concertos, but did not publish them.

In 1815, at the age of seventy, he retired. Falling into debt, he was imprisoned in the Marshalsea in 1823. He died in London on 2 August 1829, and was buried at St Martin-in-the-Fields.

He married in 1772 Hannah Maria Burnett; they had several children, including the musician Maria Frances Parke, the eldest child, and the architect Henry Parke.
