= Church Row, Hampstead =

Residential street in London, England

Coordinates: 51.55554°N 0.17944°W

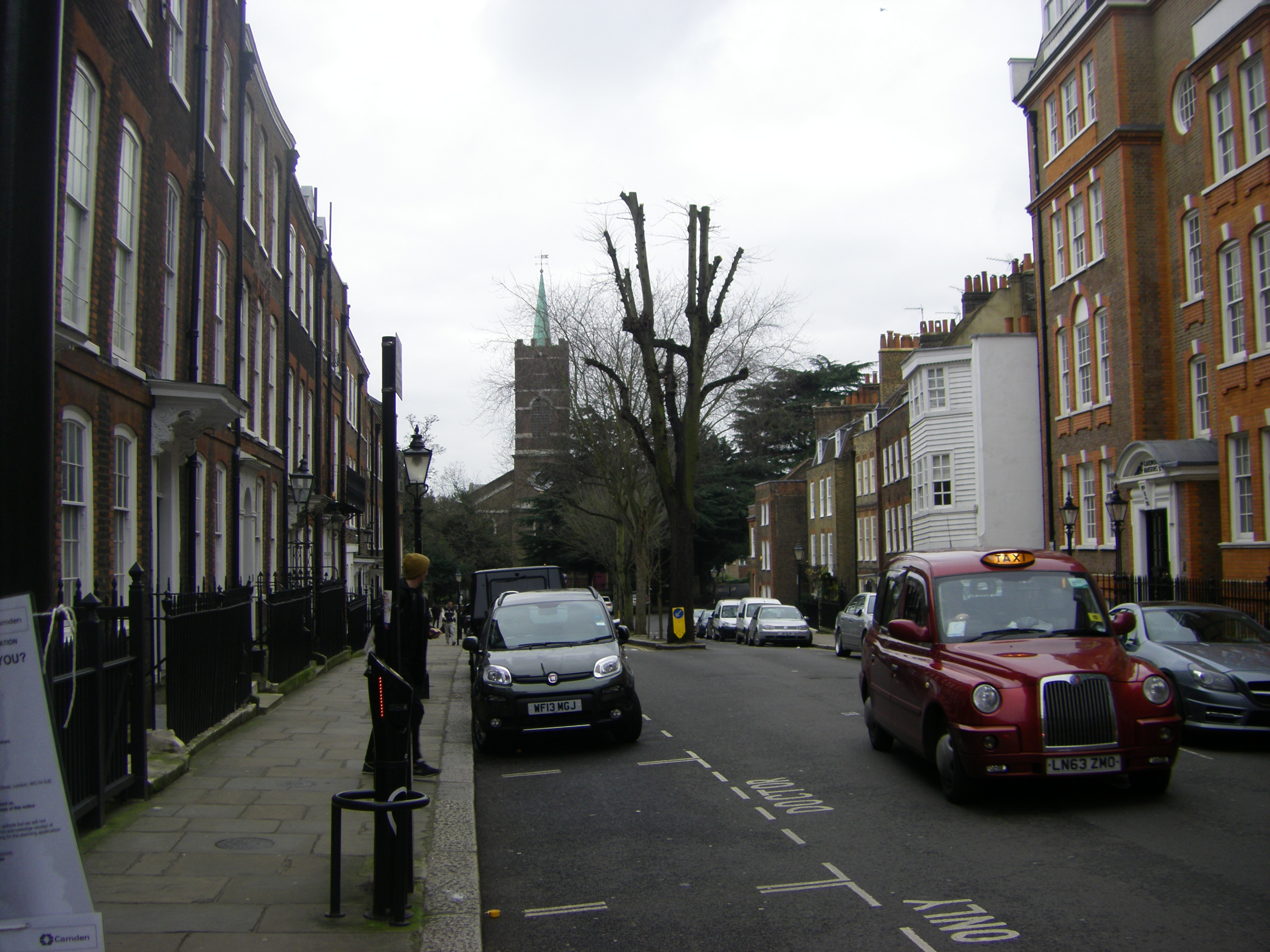

Church Row is a residential street in Hampstead in the London Borough of Camden. Many of the properties are listed on the National Heritage List for England. The street runs from Frognal in the west to Heath Street in the east. St John-at-Hampstead and its additional burial ground is at the west end of the street.

Mavis Norris in her Book of Hampstead describes the street as "the show piece of Hampstead" and it "is almost completely preserved in its early eighteenth-century elegance". The 1998 London: North edition of the Pevsner Architectural Guides, described Church Row as "the best street in Hampstead" thought it was "better still" before the construction of Gardnor Mansions at the Heath Street end.

Ian Nairn, in his 1966 book Nairn's London describes the design of the street as "complete freedom which results from submission to a common style. A rough gentlemen's agreement about heights and size...and you can do what you want". Nairn was critical of the number of parked cars and felt that the trees that run down in the middle of Church Row broke up the space of the street. Nairn felt that the south side of Church Row was more "austere and formal" than the north side which was "much more ribald".

Anne Thackeray described the street as 'an avenue of Dutch ed-faced houses leading demurely to the old church tower that stands guarding its graves in the flowery churchyard'.

A line of trees runs down the middle of the street. The trees have been present since at least the development of the south side of the street in the 1720s. Six lime trees were planted in the mid 19th century, of which only one still stands, at the furthest end from the church. The present trees were planted in the 1970s, and are maintained by the London Borough of Camden.

== Architecture ==
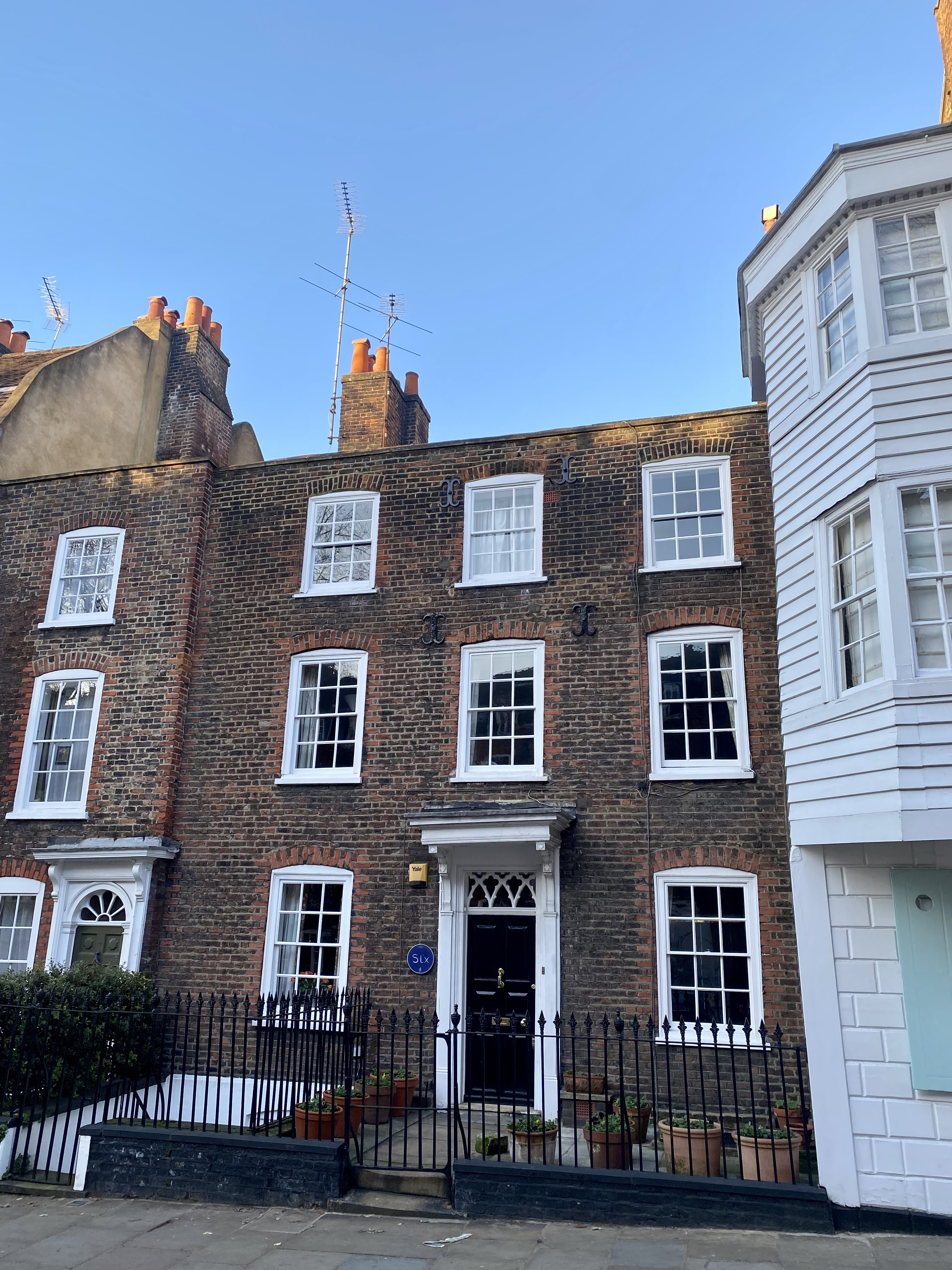
No. 6 in 2022

Gardnor Mansions dominates the top part of Church Row by Heath Street. It was the first modern block of flats built in Hampstead. Norris describes Gardnor Mansions as a "dull block of flats" that "[breaks] the harmony of the north side". Adjoining Gardnor Mansions is No. 5, which is listed II*. No. 5 projects out into the street and is noted for its distinctive white weatherboarding which was added in the late 18th-century. It was built in 1728 by an R. Hughes. The distinct design of No. 5 in contrast to its red brick neighbours on Church Row is described in its NHLE listing as "an important element in the picturesque composition" of the street.

No. 6 and its attached railings are listed Grade II as is No. 7. No. 8 and its attached railings and gate are listed Grade II. Ian Nairn described No. 8 as "odd" as it was "only two bays wide but wider than everything else". No. 9 is listed Grade II* and No. 9a is listed Grade II. 10 and attached railings are listed Grade II. 11 is listed Grade II. No. 12 with its attached railings, gate, and lamp holder is listed Grade II, it adjoins the graveyard extension of St Johns. No. 15 was built in 1924 in a complimentary style to the 18th-century houses of Church Row.

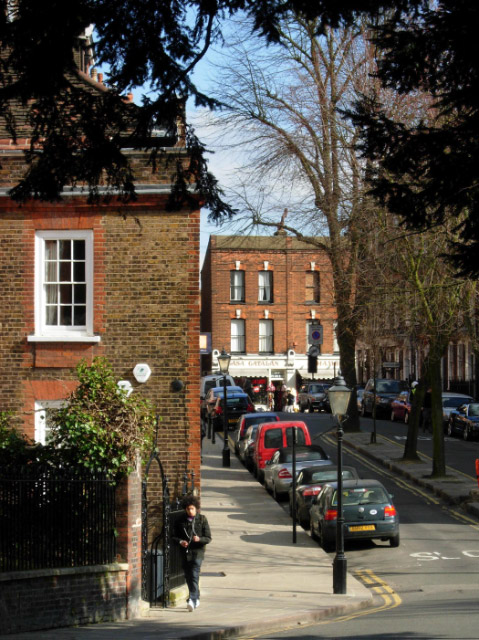
Looking down Church Row from St. John's church in 2016

On the south side, 24 to 28 are listed Grade II*. 24 Perrins Walk is the former coach house to No. 24 Church Row. 23, 22, and 21 are individually listed Grade II*. No. 20 and its attached railings are listed Grade II* as is Nos. 18 and 19. Nos. 15, 16, and 17 are individually listed Grade II.

Listed street furniture on Church Row include six bollards at the end of the path that links Frognal Way with Church Row and ten cast iron mid 19th-century lamp posts.

== Filming location ==
15 Church Row is shown as the surgery of Dr Burgess in the 1959 film Sapphire. Eve is shown arriving at her parents house on Church Row in Alfred Hitchcock's 1950 film Stage Fright. Church Row is shown as the address of John Preston's home in the 1955 film Alias John Preston. Freddie tries to sell insurance on Church Row in the 2010 film Cemetery Junction. Diane Keaton walked along Church Row and other nearby streets in the 2017 film Hampstead. Scenes from the 2019 BBC miniseries of A Christmas Carol were filmed on Church Row and the churchyard of St. John's in 2019.

== Notable residents ==
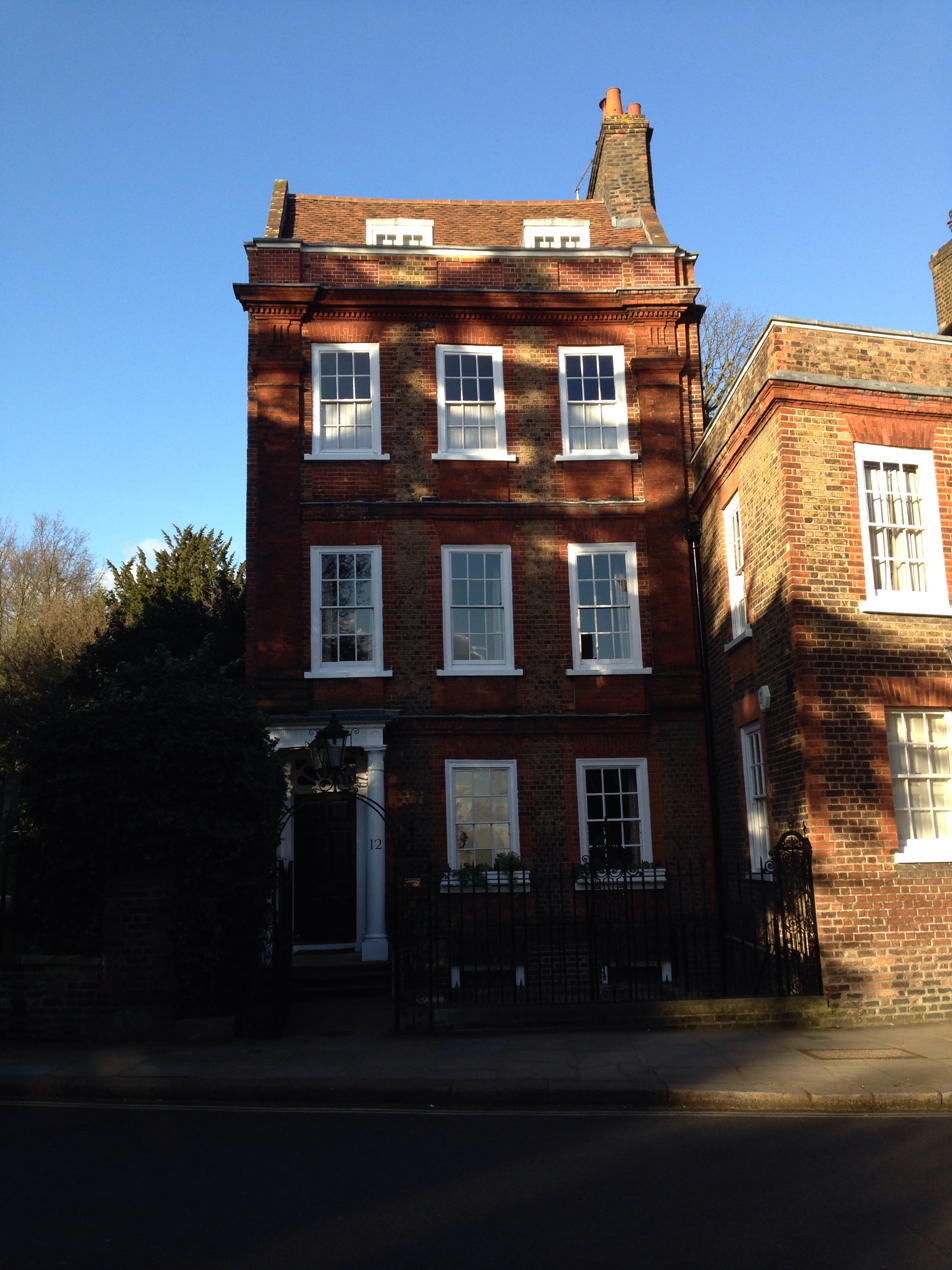
No. 12 in 2016

The scientist and philosopher Henry Cavendish lived at the end of Church Row by St. John's church during the 1780s. Cavendish's town residence was in Great Marlborough Street. He calculated that the solar time difference between his two houses was exactly 10.2 seconds. Cavendish performed experiments on the air quality of Hampstead and on freezing mercury at the house.

The writer H. G. Wells bought No. 17 in 1909 and lived there with his wife, Jane, and two sons, George "Gip" Philip and Frank Richard, until 1912. In 1910 Gip underwent an appendectomy in the study of the house. Wells wrote The History of Mr Polly, Tono-Bungay, Ann Veronica, The Sleeper Awakes, The New Machiavelli and Marriage while at the house as well as having an extramarital affair with the writer Elizabeth von Arnim while living there. In August 1909, in the first year of the family's occupation, Wells's daughter with Amber Reeves, a 21-year-old student, and future feminist writer, was born. Wells also lived in a flat in Candover Street, off Great Portland Street at this time. Wells's book Floor Games, written in 1911, was inspired by children's games he and his sons would play on the floors of the house. A frequent visitor to Wells at the house was George Bernard Shaw who recommended that he purchase a pianola, which he duly did. The comedian Peter Cook bought No. 17 for £24,000 in 1965 (equivalent to £586,953 in 2023) and lived here with his wife and two daughters until 1971, when it was sold for £45,000. Cook and Dudley Moore wrote their Pete & Dud routines in the attic of the house, Cook's study. The kitchen was in the basement of the house and Cook's wife, Wendy, would prepare dinner parties that would attract many notable people of the 1960s including John Bird, Eleanor Bron, John Cleese, Michael Foot, Bernard Levin, Victor Lownes, Malcolm Muggeridge, Charlotte Rampling, Willie Rushton, Peter Sellers, Cat Stevens, Ken Tynan and Peter Ustinov. Frequent visitors to Cook at the house included John and Cynthia Lennon and Paul McCartney. Lennon and Cook would perform comedy routines and characters at the dinner table. Nicholas Luard recalled a dinner party with an eclectic mix of guests including the actors Tom Courtney, and Peter O'Toole, the poet Christopher Logue, fashion designer Mary Quant and the boxer Terry Downes.

The Gothic revival architects George Frederick Bodley, Thomas Garner, and George Gilbert Scott Jr. all lived on Church Row in the 1860s and 70s and would regularly meet to discuss ideas.

No. 28 was the site of several institutions from the middle of the 19th-century. It was the site of a Roman Catholic school in the 1850s and a home for the 'rescue of young women' in the 1860s. In the 1870s it was a home for young female servants. It served as the offices of the Women's Co-operative Guild in 1908. The writer Virginia Woolf and her husband Leonard visited the guild here.

The average price of a property on Church Row was estimated at £2.9 million in 2020.

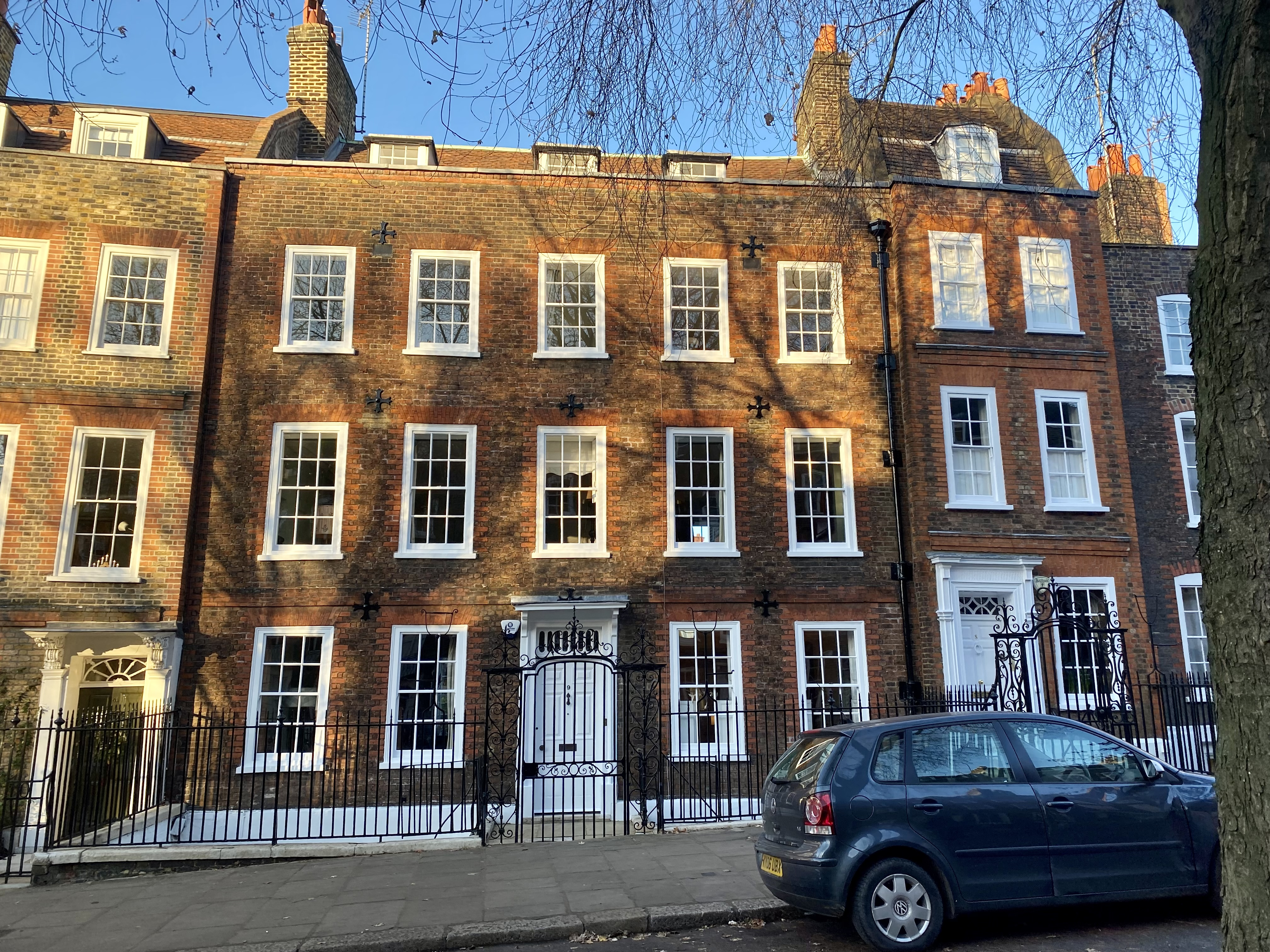
No. 9 in 2022

=== List of notable residents ===
- No. 8 – Donald C Towner, noted ceramic historian and painter, 1937 to 1985
- No. 12 - Edward Vansittart Neale, christian socialist and barrister
- No. 16 - William Booth Scott, engineer
- No. 17 – H. G. Wells, writer and his family, 1909 to 1912, Peter Cook, comedian and writer, 1965 to 1971, Edward Walford, magazine editor
- No. 18 – John James Park, historian, and his father Thomas James Park, antiquary, c.1814, Frederick Wedmore, critic
- No. 19 – Richard Creed, architect, Frank Soskice, Baron Stow Hill, politician, 1970s
- No. 20 – Thomas Garner, architect, 1867-1893
- No. 21 – Edward Nairne, instrument maker, 1780s, Sir Geoffrey Mulcahy, businessman
- No. 22 – Josiah Holford, merchant, 1776
- No. 24 – George Frederick Bodley, architect, 1860s, Lord Alfred Douglas, poet, 1907 to 1910, Norman Evill, architect, 1930s
- No. 25 – Sisters Margaret, painter, and Mary Gillies, writer, 1870s., Wilkie Collins, Horace Field, architect, 1880s
- No. 26 – Giles Gilbert Scott, George Gilbert Scott Jr., architect born here, 1860s, Moira Shearer and her husband Ludovic Kennedy
- No. 27 – William Henry Fisk, artist, died here in 1884. George du Maurier, the writer and artist lived here with his family from 1870 to 1874 and his son Gerald du Maurier was born here in 1873. Cecil Sharp, the musician, later lived here from 1915.
- No. 28 – Compton Mackenzie, writer in 1910 In the 1850s was home to a Catholic school and was the Home for the Rescue of Young Women in the 1860s. The house was a home for female servants in the 1870s. It was the office of the local builder Charles Bean King in the 1890s and later home to the artist Muirhead Bone and author Compton Mackenzie. It was the office of the Co-operative Women's Guild and Margaret Llewelyn Davies in 1908.
- No. 34 – Henry Cavendish, scientist, 1782 to 1785

Malvina Cheek shared a house on Church Row with fellow artist Olive Cook in the late 1940s.

Anna Laetitia Barbauld, the writer and poet lived on Church Row in the early 1800s, though it is not known exactly which house she occupied. Nos. 2, 8, 9 and 11 have all been proposed at various times.

The local builder and property developer Charles Bean King lived on Church Row during his construction of 16-22 Christchurch Hill and 15 and 17 Well Walk in the 1870s.
