= William Whitelaw (Perth MP) =

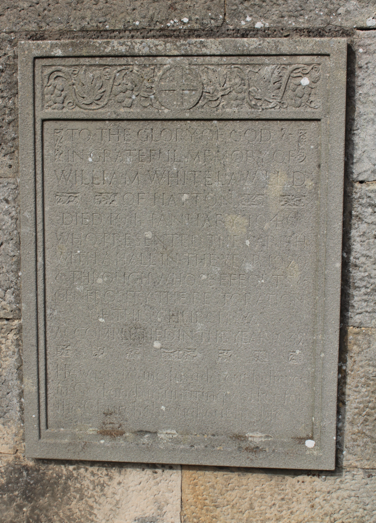
Plaque to William Whitelaw MP on Ratho church hall

William Whitelaw (15 March 1868 – 19 January 1946) was a Conservative politician in Scotland and a long serving railway director and chairman. He was the third son of Alexander Whitelaw and a younger brother of Graeme Whitelaw.

He was elected at the 1892 general election as the Member of Parliament (MP) for Perth, but lost his seat at the 1895 general election and was defeated when he stood again in 1900.

Of a Scottish landed gentry family, Whitelaws of Gartshore in Dumbartonshire, and an Old Harrovian and graduate of Trinity College, Cambridge, Whitelaw was a director of the Highland Railway (HR) from 1898, and Chairman of the HR from 1902 to 1912, and again in 1916. He was later Chairman of the North British Railway (NBR), being appointed in 1912, and when the NBR amalgamated with other railways at the start of 1923 to form the London and North Eastern Railway (LNER), Whitelaw was elected unanimously to become the first Chairman of the LNER. He resigned from this post in September 1938.

Whitelaw was married to Gertrude, daughter of Colonel T. C. Thompson of Milton Hall, Cumberland; they were the paternal grandparents of politician William Whitelaw, 1st Viscount Whitelaw by their son, William Alexander Whitelaw, who was killed in the First World War.

In 1923 the LNER ordered forty new Class A1 locomotives, of which twenty were to be built by the North British Locomotive Company (NBL), a Scottish firm. The first of the NBL locomotives, no. 2563 delivered in August 1924, was named William Whitelaw when new, because Whitelaw was the LNER Chairman. The name was carried until July 1941, when it was transferred to Class A4 no. 4462, formerly named Great Snipe. No. 4462, latterly numbered 60004, carried the name until withdrawal in 1966.

Parliament of the United Kingdom
Preceded by Charles Stuart Parker	Member of Parliament for Perth; 1892–1895	Succeeded by Robert Wallace
