= John Parke (disambiguation) =

John Parke (1827–1900) was Union Army general in the American Civil War.

John Parke may also refer to:

- John Parke (oboist) (1745–1829), English oboist
- John Parke Custis (1754–1781), stepson of George Washington
- John Parke (footballer) (1937–2011), Northern Irish international association football player

== See also ==
- John Park (disambiguation)
