= William Henry Fisk =

English painter

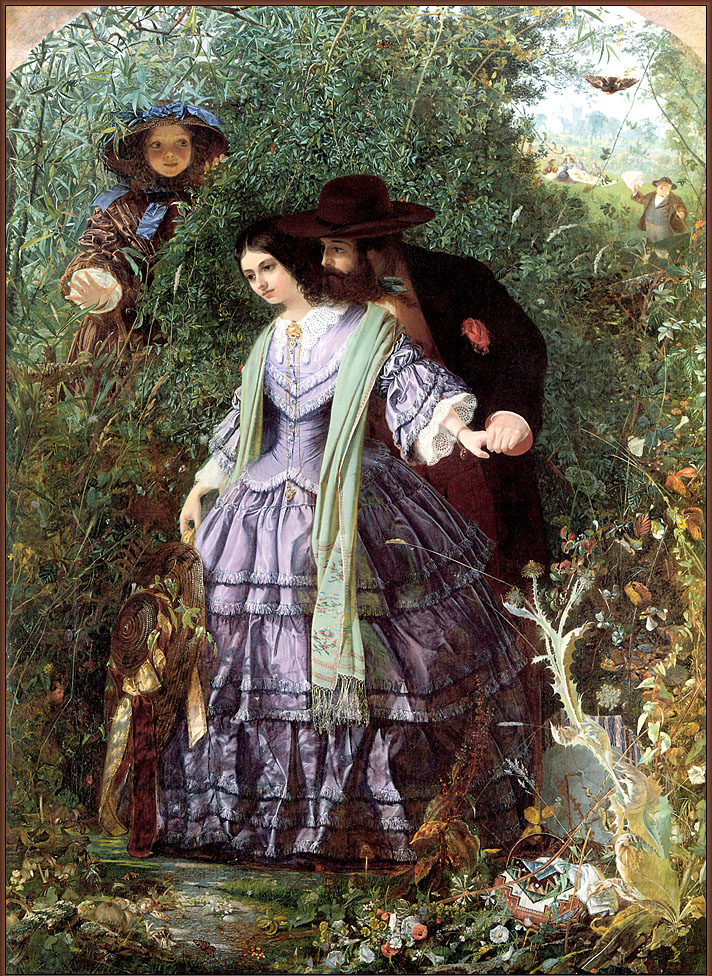
The Secret (1858) Private collection

William Henry Fisk (1827–1884), was an English painter of landscapes and historical subjects, and a drawing-master.

== Life ==
Fisk, born in Homerton, Middlesex, was the son of William Fisk. He was a pupil of his father, and also studied at the Royal Academy. He was a skilled draughtsman, and as such was appointed anatomical draughtsman to the Royal College of Surgeons. He exhibited as a painter for the first time in 1846. Three years later he was the first of a series of artists to be invited to Balmoral to paint watercolour views for Queen Victoria. She selected four of his images of the area for inclusion in one of her 'souvenir albums'.

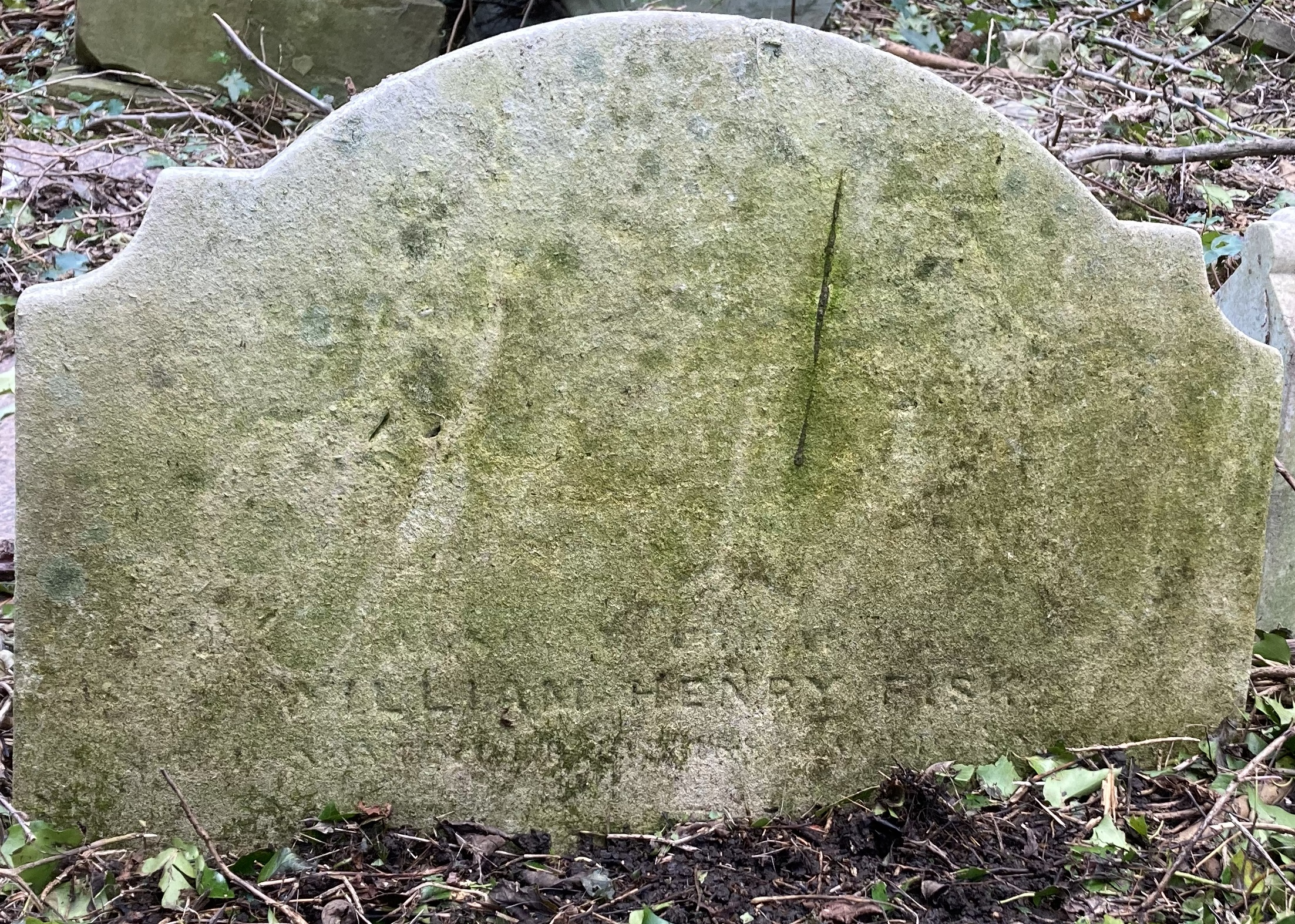
Grave of William Henry Fisk in Highgate Cemetery

He exhibited paintings of historical, religious and genre subjects at the Royal Academy from 1850 until 1873, and was an occasional exhibitor at the other London exhibitions and also in Paris. He was teacher of drawing and painting to University College School, London, and in that capacity was very successful and of high repute. He was a clear and logical lecturer on the practical aspect of art, and succeeded in attracting large audiences in London and the provinces. He also occasionally contributed articles on painting to the press. He was appointed anatomical draughtsman to the Royal College of Surgeons.

In the 1860s Fisk was commissioned to design mosaics depicting Lorenzo Ghiberti and Albrecht Dürer as part of a series of portraits of great artists for the 'Kensington Valhalla' in the South Court of the South Kensington Museum (now the Victoria and Albert Museum). Only the painting of Ghiberti was reproduced in mosaic, but Fisk's full sized oil versions for both remain in the museum.

In 1863, Fisk was interested in the French Revolution; his painting Robespierre Receiving Letters from Friends of his Victims with Assassination Threats is nowadays exhibited in the Musée de la Révolution française.

He died on 13 November 1884, at No. 27 Church Row, in Hampstead, in his 58th year and was buried on the western side of Highgate Cemetery.

== Gallery ==
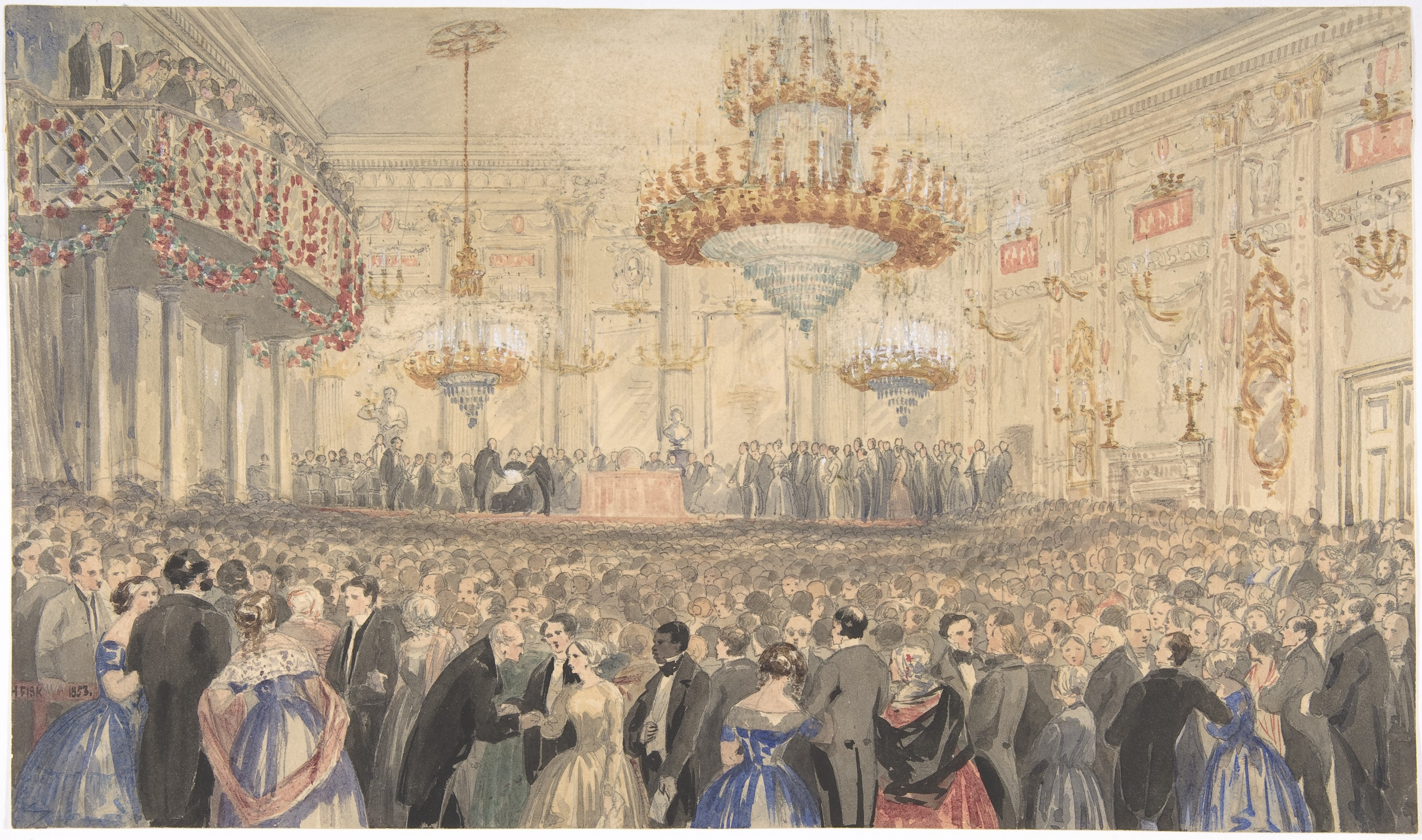
Abolition Meeting Held at Willis's Rooms in Honour of Harriet Beecher Stowe (1853)
Watercolour, Metropolitan Museum of Art

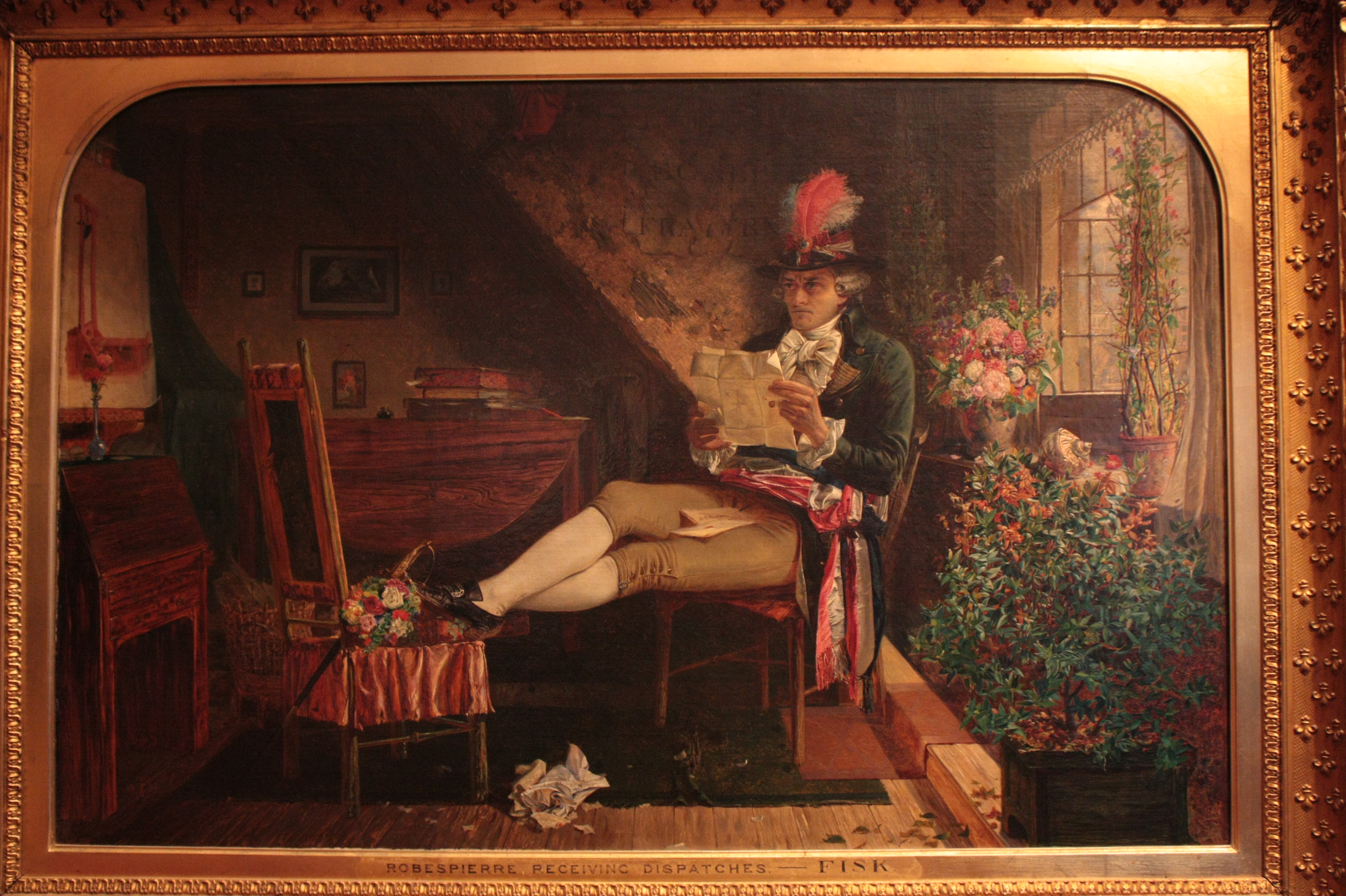
Robespierre Reading Letters from Friends of his Victims, Threatening to Murder Him (1863)
Oil on canvas, Musée de la Révolution française

== Sources ==
This article incorporates text from a publication now in the public domain: Cust, Lionel (1885–1900). "Fisk, William Henry". Dictionary of National Biography. London: Smith, Elder & Co.
