= John Park =

John Park may refer to:

- John Park (educator) (1775–1852) in Boston, Massachusetts
- John Park (inventor) (1814–1872), inventor of limecrete, a nineteenth-century building material
- John Duane Park (1819–1896), chief justice of the Connecticut Supreme Court
- John R. Park (1833–1900), doctor, teacher, president of University of Utah
- John Park (VC) (1835–1863), Irish sergeant who received the Victoria Cross
- John Park (architect) (1879–1948), New Zealand architect and mayor
- John Park (sailor) (1924-2004), Olympic sailor from Hong Kong
- Jon Jon Park (born 1957), British swimmer, born John Park
- John Park (politician) (born 1973), Scottish Labour Party politician
- John Park (musician) (born 1988), American singer
- John Edgar Park, computer animator
- Johnny Park, musician in the duo Archer/Park

== See also ==
- John Park Finley (1854–1943), American meteorologist
- John S. Park Historic Park, Las Vegas, Nevada
- John Parke (disambiguation)
