= Willie Park =

Willie Park may refer to:

- Willie Park Sr., first winner of The Open Championship in golf
- Willie Park Jr., his son, also winner of The Open Championship

== See also ==
- William Park (disambiguation)
