= Jewish tartan =

Tartan made for the Scottish Jewish community

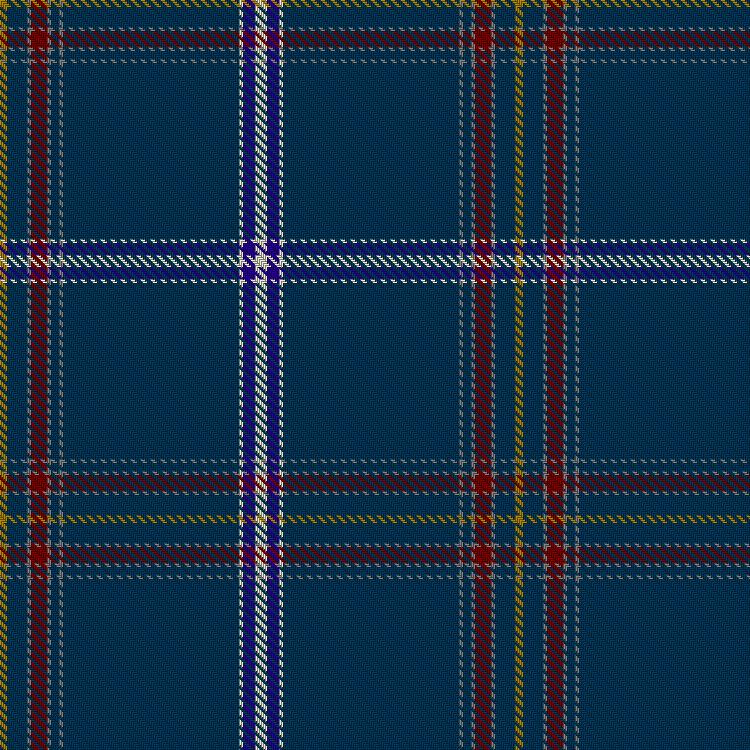
Jewish tartan designed by Jacobs and Wilton in 2016, from the Scottish Register of Tartans

Jewish tartans, also called Kosher tartans, are tartans made for the Jewish community of Scotland, as well as for Jews around the world.

== Background ==
Tartans, checkered patterns formed by intersecting coloured bands, have been an important aspect of Scottish culture, with their prominence rising at the beginning in the 19th century. Various Scottish clans and associations designed tartans to represent their respective groups.

== History ==
The Jewish community in Scotland initially did not have its own tartans. While Jews have lived in Scotland since at least the 17th century, they did not begin to arrive to Scotland in significant numbers until the 19th century. Jews were few in number, cultural newcomers to the country, and were not part of the clans. As Jews began to assimilate and become more integrated into Scottish society, however, demand for "Jewish tartans" began to grow.

The first Jewish tartan, called the Shalom Tartan, was designed in 2008 by Clive Schmulian from Glasgow’s Jewish community. The Shalom Tartan consists of lines of black, white, and two different shades of blue, representing elements of the flags of Scotland and Israel.

After the debut of the Shalom Tartan, Rabbi Mendel Jacobs and Brian Wilton from the Scottish Tartans Authority designed another Jewish tartan in 2016. Jacobs was inspired by tartans for other ethnic and religious minorities in Scotland, such as a Sikh tartan and a Polish tartan. This second tartan has blue and white lines, as does the Shalom Tartan, to integrate both the flags of Israel and Scotland. An additional line in gold stands for the Ark of the Covenant, a silver line stands for the Torah, and a dark red line represents the wine of the Kiddush. Both tartans are kosher: they are made of only wool to adhere to the law of shatnez, which prohibits the mixing of wool and linen.

The newer Jewish tartan is officially registered with the Scottish Register of Tartans.

== See also ==
- History of the Jews in Scotland
- List of tartans
