= Maria Frances Parke =

English soprano singer, pianist and composer (1772–1822)

Maria Frances Parke (26 August 1772 – 31 July 1822) was an English soprano, pianist and composer of keyboard works.

Parke was born in London. Her father was the oboist John Parke, while her uncle was the oboist and composer William Thomas Parke.

She made her debut as a pianist and singer at the age of nine. She is known to have played the harpsichord for a concert in 1781. At ten she performed a Clementi duet with Maria Hester Park née Reynolds (1760–1813), with whom she is sometimes confused.

As soprano soloist, Parke performed at the Handel Commemorations, at the Hanover Square Rooms, and at the Salomon concert series (1791–1795) in which Joseph Haydn also participated. Haydn directed a symphony at one of her benefit concerts. Her compositions, performed at the Vauxhall Gardens, included keyboard and vocal works. The Three Grand Sonatas for the piano forte with additional keys, op. 1, were published in 1799.

In 1815 she married John Beardmore, following which she retired from music. She died in London in 1822.

== Works ==
Selected works include:

- A Divertimento and Military Rondo for the Piano
- Grand Sonata in F Major for Solo Piano
- Grand Sonata in E-flat Major for Solo Piano
- Grand Sonata in D Major for Solo Piano
