= Parkes =

Parkes may refer to:

- Sir Henry Parkes (1815–1896), Australian politician, one of the earliest and most prominent advocates for Australian federation

== Named for Henry Parkes ==
- Parkes, New South Wales, a regional town
- Parkes Observatory, a radio telescope near Parkes, New South Wales
- Parkes Shire, a local government area in New South Wales
- Parkes, Australian Capital Territory, a suburb of Canberra
- Division of Parkes (1901–1969), an abolished Sydney electorate in the Australian House of Representatives
- Division of Parkes, a current regional electorate in the House of Representatives
- Tenterfield School of Arts, known as the Sir Henry Parkes School of Arts
- HMAS Parkes, a Royal Australian Navy corvette during World War II

== People ==
- Alexander Parkes (1813–1890), English inventor
- Broc Parkes (born 1981), Australian motorcycle racer
- Colin Murray Parkes (born 1928), British psychiatrist
- Dave Parkes, Canadian sports administrator
- David Parkes (footballer, born 1950), Irish football player
- Ebenezer Parkes (1848–1919), English politician
- Edmund Alexander Parkes (1819–1876), English physician
- Edmundson Parkes (1904–1997), President and CEO of United Gas Corporation
- Sir Edward Parkes (1926–2019), vice-chancellor of City University London (1974–1978)
- Ernie Parkes (1894–?), Canadian ice hockey player
- Fanny Parkes (1794–1875), Welsh travel writer
- Gerard Parkes, Irish-born Canadian actor
- Gregory Parkes (b. 1964), American Catholic bishop
- Harry Parkes (diplomat) (1828–1885), British consul in China and Japan
- Harry Parkes (footballer, born 1888), (1888–1947), English footballer and manager
- Harry Parkes (footballer, born 1920) (1920–2009), English footballer
- Henry Bamford Parkes (1904–1972), English historian and author
- Howard Parkes (1877–1920), English cricketer
- James Parkes (priest) (1896–1981), historian and activist from the Channel Islands
- James Parkes (rugby union) (born 1980), English rugby union player
- James S. Parkes, American politician
- Jordan Parkes (born 1983), English footballer
- Joseph Parkes (1796–1865), English political reformer
- Kineton Parkes (1865–1938), English novelist, art historian and librarian
- Lauren Parkes (born 1987), American beauty pageant contestant
- Malcolm Parkes (1930 - 2013), English paleographer
- Michael Parkes (born 1944), American fantasy artist
- Mike Parkes (1931–1977), British racing driver
- Nii Parkes (born 1974), British-born Ghanaian poet
- Phil Parkes (footballer, born 1947), English football goalkeeper (for Wolverhampton Wanderers)
- Phil Parkes (footballer, born 1950), English football goalkeeper (for Queens Park Rangers and West Ham United)
- Robin Parkes, Australian businessman
- Samuel Parkes (chemist) (c. 1759–1825), British chemist
- Samuel Parkes (VC) (1815–1864), British recipient of the Victoria Cross
- Shaun Parkes (born 1973), English actor
- Taylor Parkes (born 1972), British journalist
- Terence Parkes, UK cartoonist known as Larry
- Tony Parkes (born 1949), English professional footballer
- Walter F. Parkes, American screenwriter and producer

== See also ==
- Parkes process, a pyrometallurgical industrial process
- Parks (surname)
- Parke (disambiguation)
- Park (disambiguation)
