= Charles Frederick Baumgarten =

German-born violinist, organist, composer and teacher

Charles Frederick Baumgarten (originally Karl Friedrich Baumgarten; 1739/1740 – 1824) was a German-born violinist, organist, composer and teacher, living in London.

== Life ==
Baumgarten was born in Lübeck, and was a pupil of the organist Johann Paul Kunzen. In 1757 he moved to England.

There are few details of his early career. By 1760 he was organist of the Lutheran chapel at the Savoy. In 1763 he was leader of the orchestra of the Haymarket Theatre in London; in 1764 he was at the Smock Alley Theatre in Dublin.

He was leader of the Duke of Cumberland's private band, whose other members included William Shield and William Thomas Parke. From 1780 until 1794 he was leader of the orchestra of Covent Garden Theatre in London. Joseph Haydn met him in 1792; by this time he had almost forgotten his mother tongue. Haydn wrote in his diary that Baumgarten led "a sleepy orchestra". However he and Adalbert Gyrowetz, who was in London at the same time, acknowledged his theoretical knowledge.

His many pupils included William Dance, Thomas Welsh and William Thomas Parke.

Baumgarten died in London in 1824, aged 84. Carl Ferdinand Pohl wrote "he does not seem to have possessed the art of making use of his advantages, and was quickly forgotten."

== Compositions ==
Baumgarten's compositions include keyboard works, an oboe concerto, and six quartets for various instruments.

He also wrote some material for the theatre, including the music for Carlo Antonio Delpini's Blue Beard (1791), the overture for Harlequin, Junior (Covent Garden 1784) and some of the music for Netley Abbey (Covent Garden 1794).
