= Professional Concerts =

The "Professional Concerts" were subscription concerts established in 1783 and given at the Hanover Square Rooms in London. Leading musicians of the day performed at the concerts.

== History ==
=== Background ===
Other regular concerts began in London around this time: the subscription concerts established by Johann Christian Bach and Carl Friedrich Abel, which ran from 1764 to 1782, and the Concerts of Antient Music, which began in 1776. The prestigious Hanover Square Rooms, accommodating about 900 people, opened in 1775 with a concert given by Bach and Abel.

=== Establishment ===
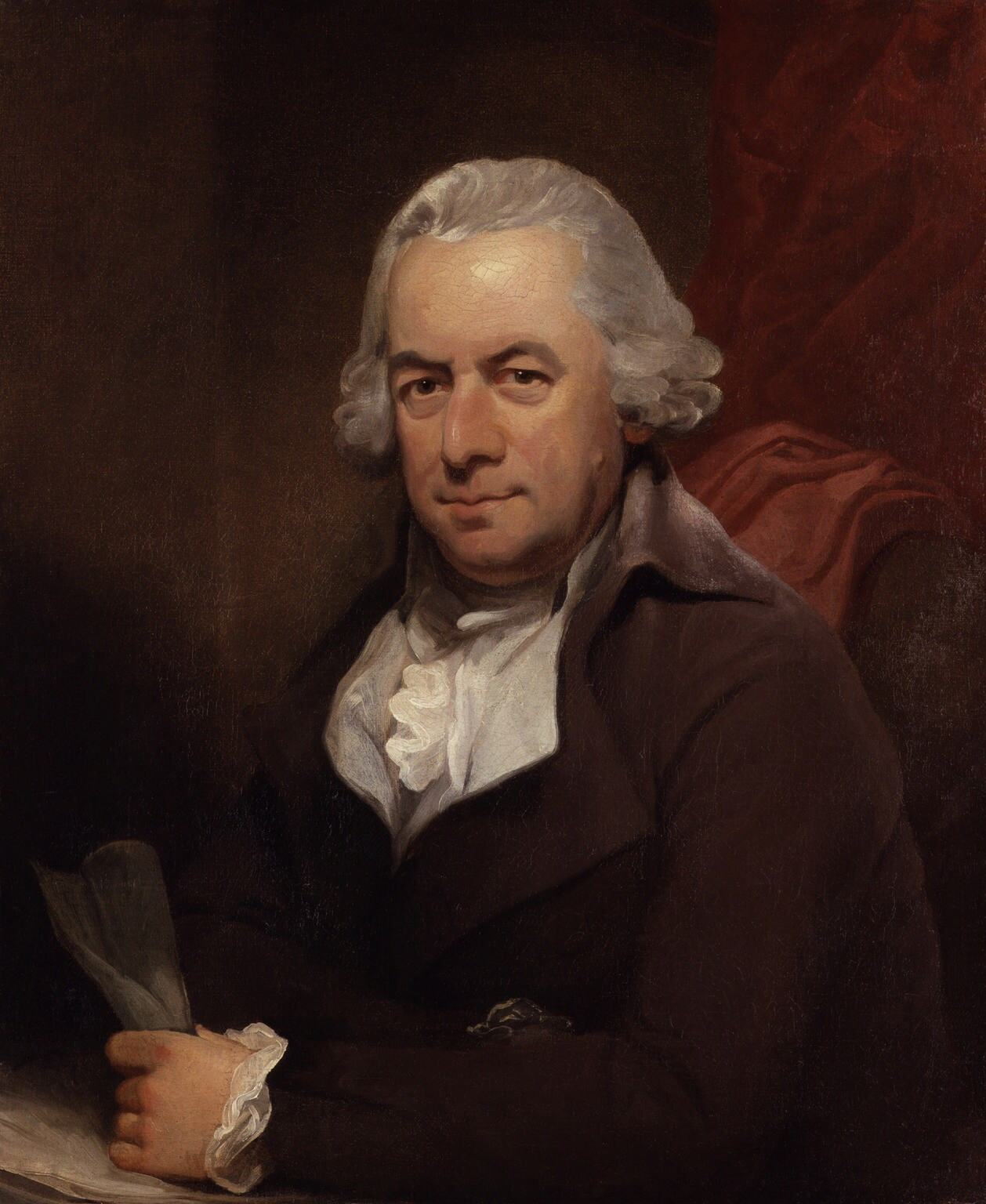
Wilhelm Cramer

The committee directing the Professional Concerts included Wilhelm Cramer, leader of the orchestra; William Dance, principal second violin; the cellist James Cervetto; and the composer and violinist William Shield. The subscription was five guineas for twelve weekly concerts.

Performers at the Professional Concerts included the tenor Samuel Harrison from about 1783, the oboist Friedrich Ramm in 1784, the pianist and singer Maria Theresia von Paradis in 1785, and the violinist George Bridgetower in 1790. William Thomas Parke wrote that in 1788 the Professional Concerts "were allowed to be of the most perfect and gratifying kind, the band being composed of performers of the first talent in the kingdom, and the company of the most elegant description."

=== Rivalry with Salomon's concerts ===
Johann Peter Salomon had been excluded from the Professional Concerts, and set up his own concerts in 1791, continuing until 1795. He brought Joseph Haydn to London to appear there.

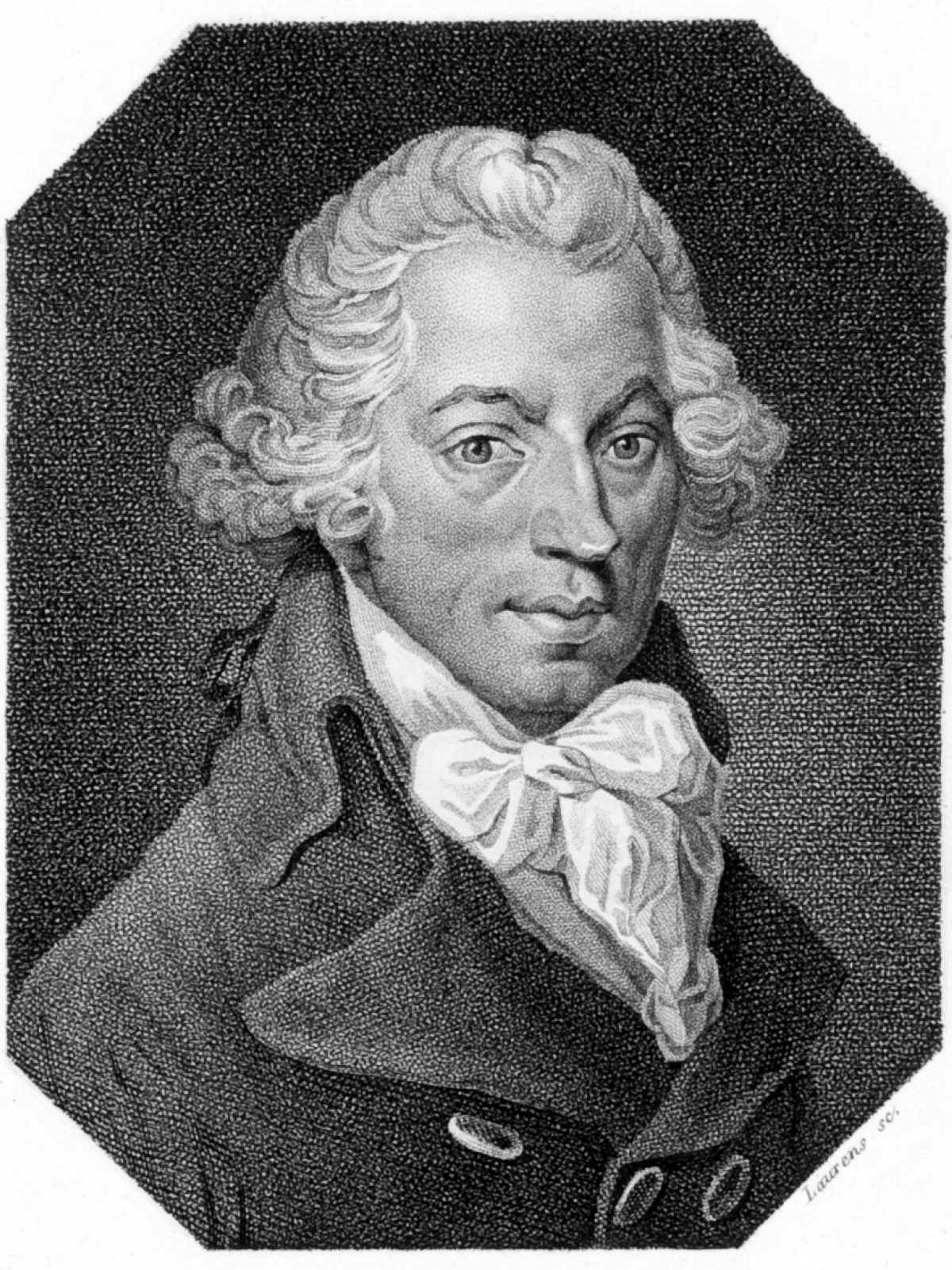
Ignaz Pleyel

The directors of the Professional Concerts, unable to make Haydn break his engagements with Salomon, invited his pupil Ignaz Pleyel to conduct concerts, hoping that rivalry between them would induce Haydn to perform at the concerts. This did not succeed, Haydn and Pleyel remaining on friendly terms. At Pleyel's first appearance in February 1792, which included a symphony he had written for the occasion, Haydn was in the audience.

The Professional Concerts, suffering from the popularity of Salomon's concerts, ended in 1793.

== See also ==
- Vocal Concerts
