= John S. Park Historic District =

Historic district in Nevada, United States

- John S. Park Historic Park
- U.S. National Register of Historic Places
- U.S. Historic district
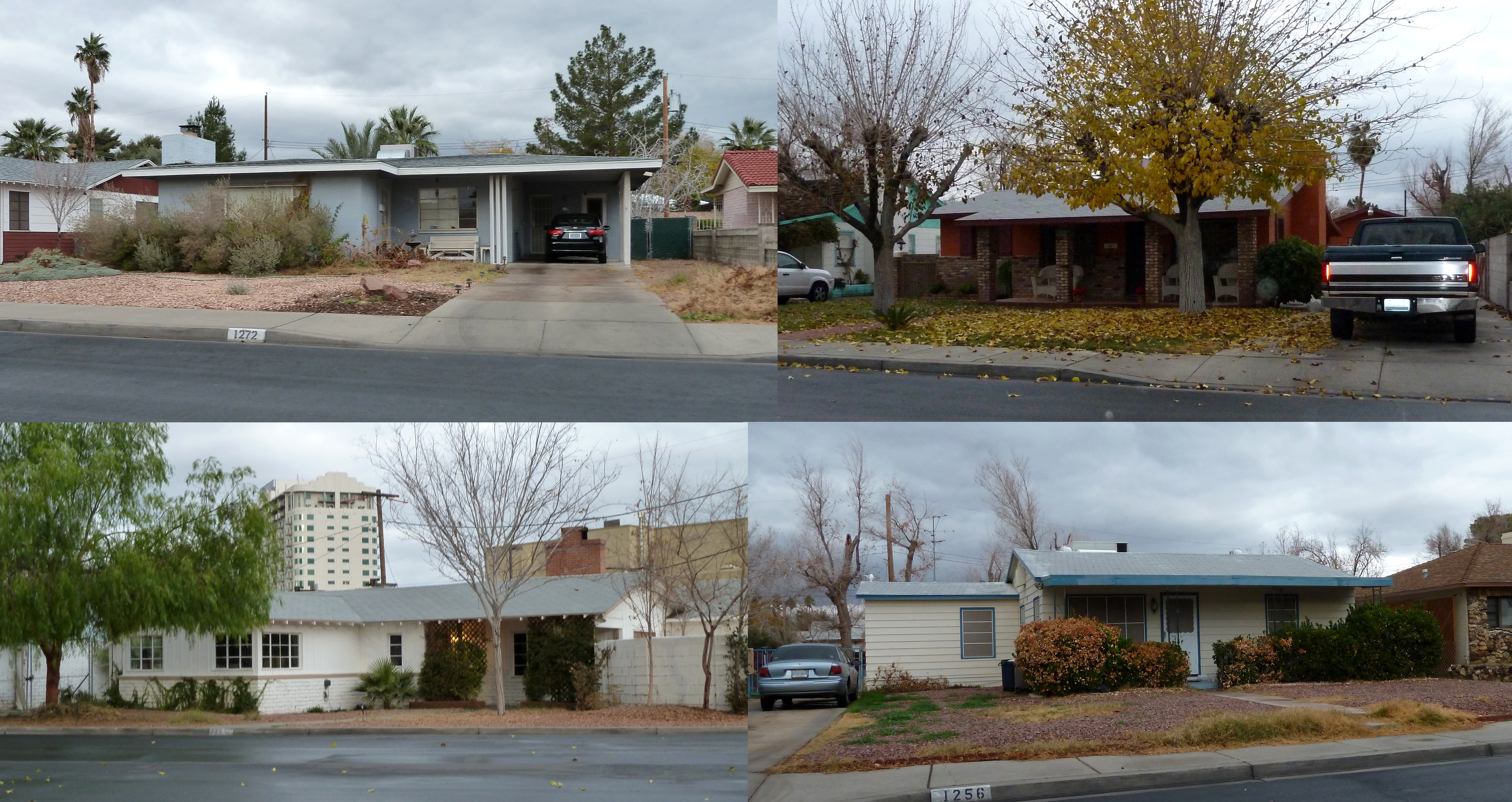

- Location within Nevada Location within the United States
- Location: Roughly bounded by Charleston Blvd., Las Vegas Blvd., Franklin Ave., and S. Ninth St., Las Vegas, Nevada
- Coordinates: 36.15646°N 115.14399°W
- Built: 1931
- Architectural style: Late 19th And 20th Century Revivals, Modern Movement
- NRHP reference No.: 03000412
- Added to NRHP: May 16, 2003

John S. Park Historic District, composed of the Park Place Addition and Vega Verde subdivisions, is in Las Vegas, Clark County, Nevada. The historic district is named for John S. Park who arrived in Las Vegas in 1907. It was listed on the United States National Register of Historic Places in 2003.

The neighborhood was named by the American Planning Association as one of the 10 best neighborhood in the United States for 2010.

== Geography ==
The city listed the John S. Park Historic District which is bounded by Charleston Boulevard, Las Vegas Boulevard, Franklin Avenue, and South Ninth Street, and 5th Place on its historic register on March 19, 2003.

== History ==
The John S. Park Neighborhood Association was formed in 1995. When local casino owner Bob Stupak announced plans to build a replica of the Titanic in the area, homeowners were inspired to work to preserve their neighborhood from commercial development.
