= William Dance =

English pianist and violinist (1755–1840)

William Dance (20 December 1755 – 5 June 1840) was an English pianist and violinist.

== Life ==
William Dance was the grandson of the architect George Dance (c.1694–1768). His father was the actor James Dance (1721–1774) and his mother may have been James' wife Elizabeth or the actress Mrs Love. He was born on 20 December 1755 in London, England, UK.

Dance studied the piano under Theodore Aylward the elder (1730–1801) and the violin under Charles Frederick Baumgarten. He later studied with the renowned Felice Giardini.

Dance played violin in the orchestra at the Theatre Royal, Drury Lane from 1771 to 1774 and in the King's Theatre orchestra 1775–1793.

He was lead violinist at the Haymarket Theatre during the summer seasons (1784–90) and at the Handel commemoration in Westminster Abbey in 1790. Dance was not regarded as a soloist on the violin, however William Thomas Parke praised his "great taste and execution" on the piano.

Around 1800 he gave up public performances and became a notable teacher of music in London.

In 1813 Dance proposed a meeting that led to the foundation of the Philharmonic Society. He became a director and the treasurer of the society until his death.

Around 1812 he noticed Michael Faraday, then a bright but unknown young assistant at a Southwark bookshop who was interested in self-improvement and science. Dance mentored him by providing tickets for him to attend lectures at the Royal Institution.

== Published works ==
- Six Lessons for the Harpsichord or Piano-Forte, dated about 1780
- Several later editions, songs, preludes, fantasias, variations, and numerous piano sonatas, including op. 4 (1805).
