= Parker T. Williamson =

Parker T. Williamson is a conservative minister of the Presbyterian Church (USA).

== Education ==
Williamson earned a Master of Divinity at Union Presbyterian Seminary in Richmond, Virginia, where he studied under John H. Leith, who also held a strongly critical, conservative perspective of the Presbyterian Church. While there, he joined two classmates on Martin Luther King Jr.'s Selma to Montgomery marches, in order to encourage Civil Rights legislation. Upon graduation, he pursued further studies at Yale Divinity School, where he earned a Master of Philosophy in Christian Ethics.

Completing his studies, Williamson started a ministry in Lenoir, North Carolina, validated by the Presbytery of Western North Carolina.

== Conservative Christian ==
Williamson has advocated against liberation theology and accommodation of the church to post-modern cultural mores. He was the founder and editor of the Presbyterian Layman newspaper, and the founder and CEO of the Presbyterian Lay Committee, both of which espoused his views that the less conservative member of the Presbyterian church were preaching a "false gospel".

In December 2003, the Committee on Ministry of the Presbytery of Western North Carolina voted to withdraw its validation of Williamson's ministry, prompted by his writings against what he considered to be unorthodox practices and policies of the denomination. That decision was later overturned by the Permanent Judicial Commission at the synod level.

In November 2009, Williamson signed an ecumenical statement known as the Manhattan Declaration: A Call of Christian Conscience, a manifesto issued by Eastern Orthodox, Catholic, and Evangelical Christian leaders, calling on Christians not to comply with rules and laws permitting abortion, same-sex marriage and other matters that go against their religious consciences.

== Publications ==
- Williamson, Parker T. Standing firm : reclaiming Christian faith in times of controversy Springfield, PA : PLC Publications, c1996. 209 p. ; 23 cm.
- Williamson, Parker T. Essays from Zimbabwe, 1999
- Williamson, Parker T. Vanishing Point, 2006
- Williamson, Parker T. Broken Covenant, 2007
