= Robin Parkes =

Australian businessman (died 2019)

Robin Parkes was the CEO of Freeview (Australia) from 2008 until 2011 the organisation representing the free-to-air television stations in Australia.

She died from brain cancer in December 2019.
