= Park Road =

Park Road may refer to:

- Park Road, Loughborough, a cricket Ground in Loughborough, Leicestershire, England
- Boggo Road railway station, formerly known as Park Road, a railway station in Brisbane, Queensland, Australia
- Park Road Post, a motion picture post production facility in Miramar, New Zealand
- Park Road, Buxton, a cricket ground in Buxton, England
- Park Road Shopping Center, an open area strip mall located in Charlotte, North Carolina
- Park Road, Kyiv (Parkova doroha), a street in Pechersk Raion of Kyiv
- Park Road (TV series), a Danish comedy-drama-series that debuted in 2009
- Park road Liverpool
- Park Road, Hong Kong, a major road in Mid-Levels in Hong Kong
- Park Road, Singapore
