= William Parks =

William, Will, Bill, or Billy Parks may refer to:

- William Parks (publisher), (1699–1750) eighteenth century colonial America printer and publisher
- William Parks (paleontologist) (1868–1936), Canadian geologist and paleontologist
- William Parks (baseball) (1885–?), American baseball player
- William Parks (Alamo defender)
- William Parks (sailor) (1921–2008), American Olympic sailor
- Bill Parks (1849–1911), American baseball player and manager
- Billy Parks (1948–2009), American football player
- Will Parks (born 1994), American football player

== See also ==
- William Park (disambiguation)
