= HMSAS Parktown =

Two ships of the South African Naval Service have borne the name HMSAS Parktown, after the Johannesburg suburb of Parktown, South Africa:

- HMSAS Parktown (T39) was a whaler, launched in 1929 as MV Southern Sky, sold in 1936 to become MV Sidney Smith, and requisitioned in 1940 for conversion to a magnetic minesweeper. She was sunk by German E-boats off Tobruk on 21 June 1942.
- HMSAS Parktown (T55) was a whaler, launched in Norway in 1925 as MV Lobito, renamed MV Suderoy (and later MV Suderoy I) before being requisitioned on 3 July 1941 for conversion to a minesweeper. She was laid up in September 1944 and handed to the Royal Navy in 1946 for disposal.
