= Clan McKerrell =

Scottish clan

- Motto: Dulcis Pro Patria Labor (Labour for one’s country is sweet)

Profile
- Region: Scottish Lowlands
- District: Ayrshire
- Clan McKerrell no longer has a chief, and is an armigerous clan
- Historic seat: Hillhouse, Troon, Ayrshire
- Last Chief: Charles McKerrell, 15th Laird of Hillhouse

Clan McKerrell, also known as Clan MacKerrell, is Scottish clan. The clan is officially recognized by the Court of the Lord Lyon; however, as it does not currently have a chief recognized by the Lord Lyon King of Arms, it is considered an armigerous clan.

== History ==
=== Origins of the clan ===
The surname is of ancient Celtic origin and there are several derivations of it. According to historian George Fraser Black, the Gaelic, Macfhearghil means son of Fearghal. According to O'Hart's Irish Pedigrees they are descended from one Lochlan MacCairhill Roidamna who was the future king of Ulster, but who fled to Scotland after being defeated in battle in the year 1095. The name is found in early times in Carrick, Scotland. Recherus MecMaccharil witnessed a charter by the Earl of Carrick during the reign of William the Lion. The name is also found as Carleton, which is a place name found around Kirkcudbrightshire, Wigtownshire and Ayrshire. In the records of Whithorn Priory it is recorded as Cairlitoun.

=== 15th to 16th centuries ===
John Mckerrell, 1st Laird of Hillhouse was the grandson of Martin Mckerrell (born 1490). Martin was directly descended from Sir John Mckirel, who distinguished himself at the Battle of Otterburn in 1388, where he wounded and took prisoner Rouel de Percy, who was second in command of the English host.

=== 17th to 18th centuries ===
John Mckerrell, 4th Laird of Hillhouse married Elizabeth, daughter of Robert Wallace who was the Bishop of the Isles in 1660. He also built a new mansion that replaced an older seat. John Mckerrell, 8th Laird of Hillhouse (born 1762) is credited with bringing the silk industry to Paisley, Renfrewshire. His fourth son was Colonel of the Paisley Volunteers, who were the first volunteer regiment to resist the threat of the French invasion of 1792. Colonel Mckerrell's son made a fortune in India and was Master of the Mint in Madras.

=== 19th to 20th centuries ===
In 1895, Robert Mckerrell, 13th Laird of Hillhouse sold his estates. He was a prison commissioner for Scotland and a member of the Royal Company of Archers, who are the monarch's body guard. In 1990, Charles Mckerrell, 15th Laird of Hillhouse, returned to the family lands and established his seat at Lochmaben.

== Castles ==
- Hillhouse, which is about two miles north-east of Troon, Ayrshire was held by the MacKerrells from the sixteenth century or earlier. In 1839, Prince Louis-Napoléon Bonaparte, later the Emperor of France stayed at Hillhouse while attending the Eglinton Tournament of 1839. Hillhose was sold in 1895 to the Bentincks, Dukes of Portland, and the MacKerrells of Hillhouse now live in Lochmaben, Dumfries.

== See also ==
- Scottish clan
