= John James Park =

English jurist and antiquarian

- Born: 1795
- Died: 23 June 1833 (aged 37–38); Brighton, England
- Occupations: Jurist and antiquarian

John James Park (1795 – 23 June 1833) was an English jurist and antiquarian. His father was the antiquarian and bibliographer Thomas Park.

== Biography ==
Park was the only son of the antiquary Thomas Park, by his wife, a daughter of Admiral Hughes, was born in 1795. His health being delicate, he was educated at home, but, by desultory reading in his father's library, acquired much miscellaneous knowledge, and before he was twenty gave proof of no small aptitude for antiquarian research in his ‘Topography and Natural History of Hampstead,’ Loncon, 1814; 2nd edit. 1818, 8vo.

On 14 November 1815, Park was admitted a student at Lincoln's Inn, where he was called to the bar on 6 February 1822, having practised for some years below it. He was initiated into the mysteries of conveyancing by Richard Preston [q. v.], and while still a student, published a learned ‘Treatise on the Law of Dower,’ London, 1819, 8vo, which was long a standard work.

As a jurist, Park belonged to the historical school; as a politician, he belonged to no party. In regard to law reform, codification was his especial aversion (cf. his Contre-Project to the Humphreysian Code, and to the Project of Redaction of Messrs. Hammond, Uniacke, and Twiss, London, 1828, 8vo, and Three Juridical Letters [under the pseudonym of Eunomus]: addressed to the Right Hon. Sir Robert Peel in reference to the Present Crisis of Law Reform, London, 8vo). Park was a doctor of laws of the University of Göttingen, and in January 1831 was appointed to the chair of English law and jurisprudence in King's College, London. His health, however, was now thoroughly undermined, and he succumbed to a complication of maladies at Brighton on 23 June 1833.

Besides the works mentioned above, Park was author of: 1. ‘Suggestions on the Composition and Commutation of Tithes,’ 1823. 2. ‘An Introductory Lecture delivered at King's College, London,’ London, 1831, 8vo. 3. ‘Conservative Reform: a Letter addressed to Sir William Betham,’ London, 1832, 8vo. 4. ‘What are Courts of Equity?’ London, 1832, 8vo. 5. ‘The Dogmas of the Constitution: Four Lectures delivered at King's College, London,’ London, 1832, 8vo. 6. ‘Systems of Registration and Conveyancing,’ London, 1833, 8vo.
