= Carlo Antonio Delpini =

Italian pantomimist and theatrical manager

Carlo Antonio Delpini (died 1828) was an Italian pantomimist and theatrical manager.

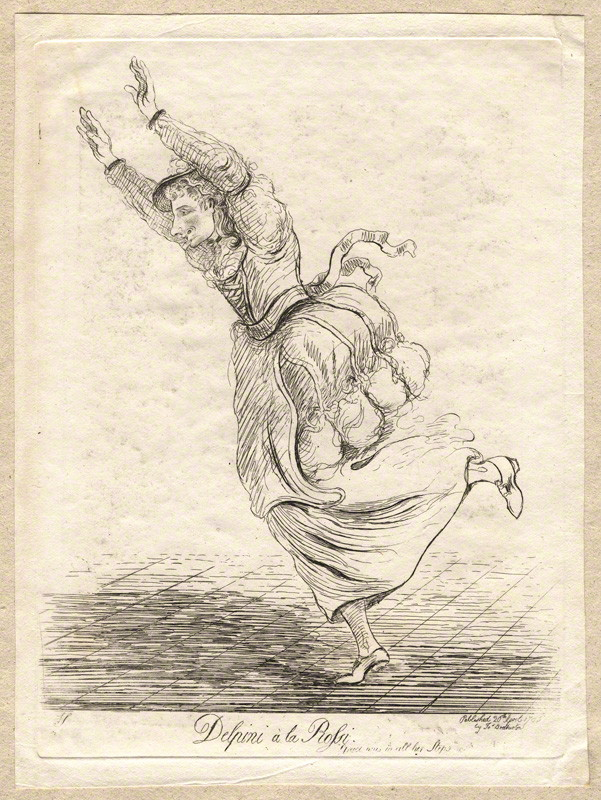
Carlo Antonio Delpini

== Life ==
Born in Rome, Delpini was a pupil of Nicolini. About 1774 he was engaged by David Garrick for the Drury Lane Theatre. There, at Covent Garden Theatre, and at the Haymarket Theatre, he supplied the mechanical arrangements for many pantomimes in which he acted.

Among Delpini's well-known pantomimes were Robinson Crusoe, in which he played the hero to the Man Friday of "Signor" Giuseppe (father of Joseph Grimaldi), Don Juan, and The Deserter of Naples. The two latter pieces were given respectively on 12 August 1787 and 1 January 1788 at the Royalty Theatre in Wellclose Square, when that venue was opened by John Palmer. On 17 February 1789 Delpini was severely hurt at the Haymarket, acting in the Death of Captain Cook, a serious ballet from the French.

Delpini was for a time stage manager at the Opera. He managed private theatricals, and made on his own account some ventures, giving once at the Prince Regent, the tickets for which were sold at three guineas each. He also arranged entertainments at Brighton for the Prince as George IV. In his later years he fell into poverty, and died 13 February 1828 in Lancaster Court, Strand, London.

== Notes ==
Attribution

This article incorporates text from a publication now in the public domain: Stephen, Leslie, ed. (1888). "Delpini, Carlo Antonio". Dictionary of National Biography. Vol. 14. London: Smith, Elder & Co.
