= Henry Parke =

Henry Parke (1790–1835) was an English architect and draughtsman.

== Life ==
He was a son of John Parke the oboist, was intended for the bar, and studied under a special pleader; but a speech impediment led him to abandon the law. He studied architecture, and his father placed him with Sir John Soane, who used him as a draughtsman for his Royal Academy lectures. He became versed in mathematics, geometry, mechanics, and drawing, both architectural and landscape.

Between 1820 and 1824 Parke visited Italy, Sicily, Genoa, Greece, and Egypt, ascending the Nile in 1824 with a fellow-student, John Joseph Scoles. At Rome and elsewhere he worked with Frederick Catherwood, Thomas Leverton Donaldson, and others, measuring antique remains and modern works. On returning to England, at the end of 1824, he worked out his sketches.

Parke died 5 May 1835. Many of his oil and water-colour drawings and marine works were sold at Sotheby's by auction in May 1836.

== Works ==
In 1829 Parke published a Map of Nubia, comprising the Country between the First and Second Cataracts of the Nile, and gave a plan of the island of Philæ. He continued making drawings and views of buildings and ruins. A collection of between five and six hundred, including some near Dover, was presented to the Royal Institute of British Architects by his widow.

Parke exhibited at the Royal Academy drawings of an Interior of a Sepulchral Chamber, 1830, and Temples in the Island of Philæ, 1831. He designed a house in Queen Square, Westminster, facing on St. James's Park. He is said also to have largely designed the medal presented by some architects of Great Britain to Sir John Soane; from the die of this medal the Soane medallion prize of the Royal Institute of British Architects was reproduced.

== Notes ==
Attribution

This article incorporates text from a publication now in the public domain: Lee, Sidney, ed. (1895). "Parke, Henry". Dictionary of National Biography. Vol. 43. London: Smith, Elder & Co.
