= Bill Park =

Canadian swimmer

Personal information
- Born: 1952 (age 73–74) Toronto, Ontario, Canada

Sport
- Sport: Swimming

Bill Park (born 1952), is a Canadian swimming coach and former international swimmer. Since his competitive career in the 1960s and 1970s, Park has coached several Olympic, and Paralympic athletes including, Alex Baumann, Jessica Tuomela, Jenna Skieneh, and several other world-renowned athletes.

Par, has taken Olympic and Paralympic athletes since the 1984 Summer Olympics, in Los Angeles. Bill also coached for the Greater Trail Swim Club in Trail, British Columbia.
