= William W. Park =

Professor of Law

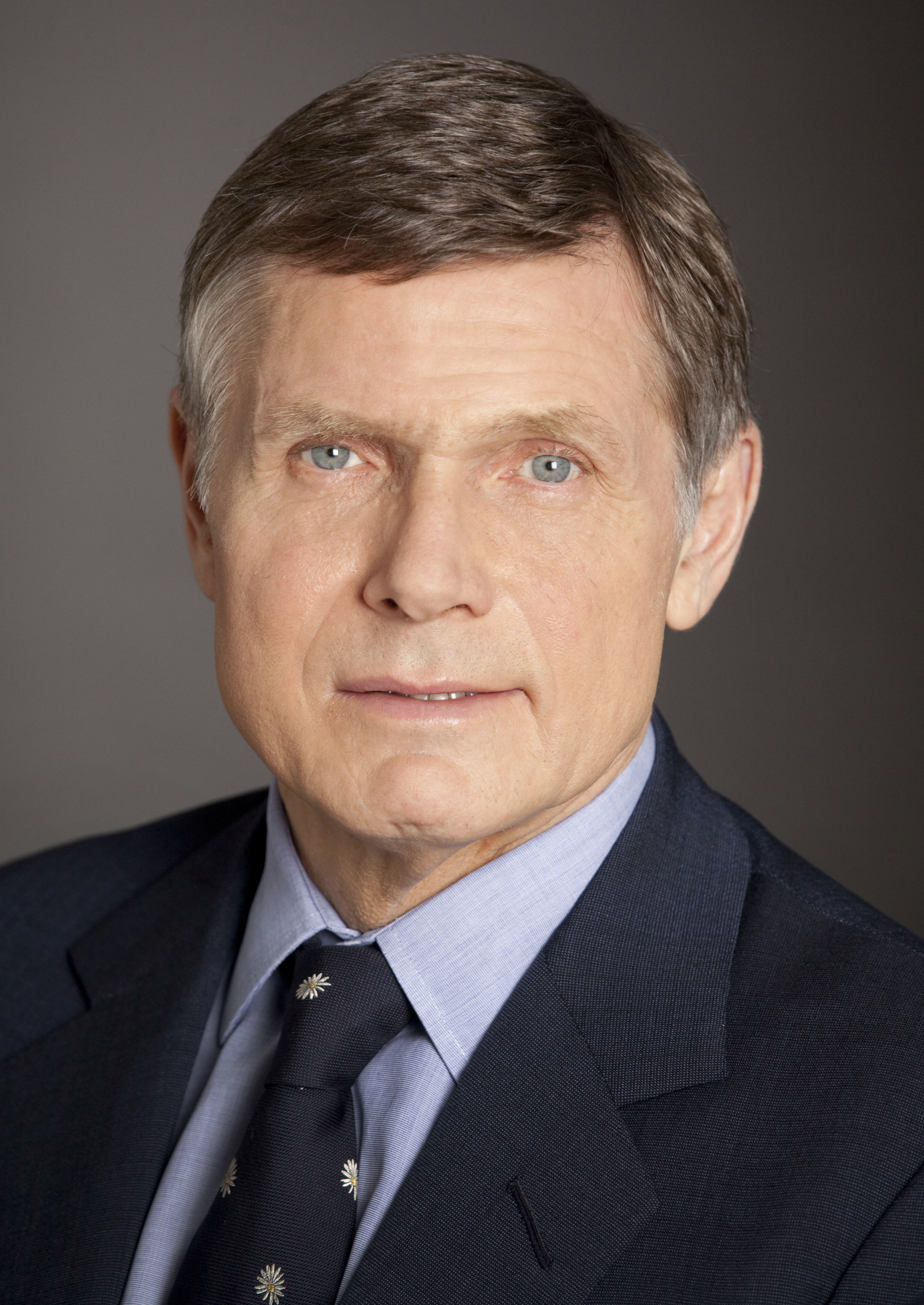
- Professor Park
- Born: July 2, 1947; Philadelphia, Pennsylvania
- Education: Yale University; Columbia Law School
- Occupation: Professor of Law

William W. Park (born July 2, 1947) is Emeritus Professor of Law at Boston University School of Law. His practice and teaching focus on international financial and commercial transactions. He has served as Arbitrator on the Claims Resolution Tribunal for Dormant Accounts in Switzerland and the Appeals Tribunal of the International Commission on Holocaust Era Insurance Claims, and has sat on the North American Free Trade Agreement (NAFTA) Chapter 14 Financial Services Roster.

Park is a member of the Governing Board of the International Council for Commercial Arbitration (ICCA) and in the past served on the American Arbitration Association Board of Directors. Park is a Fellow of the Chartered Institute of Arbitrators. The President of the United States in 2008 appointed Park to the Panel of Arbitrators for the International Centre for Settlement of Investment Disputes. In 2009 he was elected President of the London Court of International Arbitration. Park served as General Editor of the journal Arbitration International.

== Education and career ==
After studies at Yale University and Columbia Law School, Park practiced law in Paris for several years and taught law at Cambridge University, where he was a Fellow of Selwyn College. He then returned to Boston, where he taught courses in tax and international business transactions. He has served as Director of Boston University School of Law’s Morin Center for Banking Law Studies and has held visiting academic appointments at the universities of Cambridge, Dijon, Hong Kong, Auckland and Geneva, as well as the Fletcher School of Law and Diplomacy.

== Publications ==
Park's published works include Arbitration of International Business Disputes (2006; 2d Edition 2012), International Chamber of Commerce Arbitration (with W. Lawrence Craig & Jan Paulsson) (3d ed. 2000), International Commercial Arbitration (with Michael W. Reisman, W. Lawrence Craig & Jan Paulsson) (1997; 2d Edition 2014), Income Tax Treaty Arbitration (with David Tillinghast) (2004) and International Forum Selection (1995), as well as articles on the legal and tax aspects of international business and finance.

== Personal ==
Park was born in Philadelphia but grew up in Cohasset, Massachusetts, where he was President of the Student Council and ran on the track and cross country teams. During his early career he worked in Paris and Geneva and taught at Cambridge University, before returning to teach in Boston and live in Cohasset. Known as "Rusty" since childhood, Park is a long-time member of the congregation of King's Chapel in Boston, where he has held the post of Senior Warden and currently serves as Trustee.
