= Parks (surname) =

Parks is an English surname. Notable people with the surname include:

- Alan Parks (1920–1982), British surgeon
- Alan Parks (writer) (born 1963), Scottish crime writer
- Alex Parks (born 1984), English singer-songwriter
- Alycia Parks (born 2000), American tennis player
- Amy Parks (born 1982), Australian journalist and broadcaster
- Arlo Parks (born 2000), English Singer-songwriter
- Bernard C. Parks (born 1943), American politician, former chief of the Los Angeles Police Department
- Bert Parks (1914–1992), American actor, singer, and radio and television announcer (Assumed name. Original name was Bertram Jacobson)
- Billy Parks (1948–2009), American football player
- Bobby Parks (1961–2013), American basketball player, member of the Philippine Basketball Association Hall of Fame
- Bobby Ray Parks Jr. (born 1993), American basketball player, son of the above
- Bobby Parks (cricketer) (born 1959), English former cricketer
- Carson Parks (1936–2005), American songwriter, music publisher, musician and singer
- Clifton T. Parks (1895–1976), American lawyer and politician
- Cord Parks (born 1986), American football player in the Canadian Football League
- Dan Parks (born 1978), Australian-born former rugby union player
- Dave Parks (1941–2019), American football player
- Ed Parks (1917–1987), American football player
- Floyd B. Parks (1911–1942), decorated aviation officer in the United States Marine Corps during World War II.
- Floyd Lavinius Parks (1896–1959), a United States Army general during World War II.
- Gordon Parks (1912–2006), American photographer, musician, writer and film director
- Gordon Parks Jr. (1934–1979), American director best known for the film Super Fly, son of the above
- Gordon Parks (footballer) (born 1972), Scottish sports journalist and former footballer
- Harry Parks (cricketer) (1906–1984), English cricketer
- Harry Jeremiah Parks (1848–1927), U.S. Army soldier and Medal of Honor recipient
- J. L. Parks (fl. 1944–1950), American former basketball player
- James Parks (disambiguation)
- John Michael Parks (born 1946), Canadian politician
- Jordan Parks (born 1994), American basketball player
- Keaton Parks (born 1997), American soccer player
- Lisa Parks (fl. 1990s–2020s), American media scholar
- Lloyd Parks (born 1948), Jamaican reggae vocalist and bass player
- Lloyd Parks (R&B singer), American R&B/soul singer, member of Harold Melvin & the Blue Notes
- Lyman Parks (1917–2009), mayor of Grand Rapids, Michigan
- Michael Parks (1940–2017), American singer and actor
- Raymond Parks (auto racing) (1914–2010), American stock car racing team owner
- Reggie Parks (1934–2021), Canadian professional wrestler
- Robert Parks (disambiguation), multiple people
- Rosa Parks (1913–2005), African-American civil rights activist
- Sam Parks Jr. (1909–1997), American professional golfer
- Susie A. Parks (1895–1981), American switchboard operator during the Battle of Columbus
- Suzan-Lori Parks (born 1963), American playwright, screenwriter
- Terrance Parks (born 1990), American football player
- Tilman B. Parks (1872–1950), American politician
- Trevin Parks (born 1991), American basketball player
- Van Dyke Parks (born 1943), American musician and songwriter
- Walker Parks (born 2001), American football player
- William Parks (disambiguation), multiple people

== See also ==
- Parkes (disambiguation)
