= Park Township =

Park Township may refer to:

- Park Township, Sedgwick County, Kansas
- Park Township, Ottawa County, Michigan
- Park Township, St. Joseph County, Michigan
- Park Township, Pine County, Minnesota
- Park Township, Pembina County, North Dakota, in Pembina County, North Dakota
- Park Township, Hand County, South Dakota, in Hand County, South Dakota
