= Clan Gartshore =

Scottish clan from Dunbartonshire

- Motto: I Renew my age.
- Clan Gartshore no longer has a chief, and is an armigerous clan
- Historic seat: Gartshore, Kirkintilloch, Dunbartonshire
- Last Chief: Gartshore of that Ilk
Allied clans
Clan Munro
Clan Chisholm
Clan Mackintosh
Clan Campbell of Cawdor

Clan Gartshore is an armigerous lowland Scottish Clan from Dunbartonshire.

The name comes from lands of that name in the parish of Kirkintilloch in Dunbartonshire. There are references to the Gartshore Clan as far back as the late 12th century. Thomas Watson describes the earliest emergence of the clan in his 1894 book on Kirkintilloch.
