= Maria Hester Park =

- Born: 29 September 1760
- Origin: United Kingdom
- Died: 7 June 1813 (aged 52)
- Occupations: composer, pianist, singer
- Instruments: piano, harpsichord

Maria Hester Park (née Reynolds) (29 September 1760 – 7 June 1813) was a British composer, pianist, and singer. She was also a noted piano teacher who taught many students in the nobility, including the Duchess of Devonshire and her daughters.

== Biography ==
Before her marriage, Maria Hester Park gave four well-received performances, mostly in the Oxford area, on both the piano and the harpsichord. Her first public appearance was at the age of twenty-two as Maria Hester Reynolds in the Hanover Square concert series with a concerto on the harpsichord. She played a Clementi duet with Jane Mary Guest on 29 April 1783, a concerto at Willis's Rooms in March 1784 and a performance as Mrs Park ("late Reynolds") in May 1791. After her marriage in London in April 1787 to Thomas Park, an engraver turned antiquarian and man of letters, she ended her career as a performer, although she earned even more fame as composer and teacher. Her marriage appears to have been happy; several of her husband's love poems to her still exist. She corresponded with Joseph Haydn, who, on 22 October 1794, sent her a sonata of his composition (Hob. XVI:51) and a thank you letter in exchange for two of her pieces. She died in Hampstead, London at the age of 53, after many years of ill health. The Parks had five daughters and a son.

== Park's music ==
It has been said of Maria Hester Park that she was "hugely popular in the elegant drawing rooms of eighteenth century England" and that she "made her living composing the sort of music performed by Jane Austen heroines." She has been described as "one of the most prolific of the 18th century women composers." Her works are varied, competent, and professionally arranged. Her sonatas, according to The Norton/Grove dictionary of women composers, are "varied and spirited." Her Sonata in C is stylistically close to Mozart, pleasant to the ear without being overly challenging either to the performer or the listener. Mozartean features apparent in her Sonata in F include a constant bass line of straight eighth notes that form the outlines of chords, and a distinct melody with ornamentation. There are also many basic scale patterns and simple arpeggios, and the majority of her pieces are clean, lacking the melodrama of later romantic works. Her surviving music spans a quarter of a century.

== Works ==
- Op. 1, Sonatas, harpsichord/pianoforte, violin accompaniment, 1785, dedicated to Countess of Uxbridge.
- Op. 2, 3 Sonatas, harpsichord/pianoforte, c.1790.
- Op. 3, A Set of Glees with the Dirge in Cymbeline, ?1790.
- Op. 4, 2 Sonatas (No. 1 in F, No. 2 in F major), harpsichord/pianoforte, 1790.
- Op. 6, Concerto in E flat major, harpsichord/pianoforte, strings, ?1795.
- Op. 7, Sonata in C major, pianoforte, ?1796.
- Op. 8, Six easy divertimentos for the harp and piano-forte in which are introduced a celebrated German minuet & waltz . . . , op. VIII. London [1797?]
- Op. 12, Sonata for the Piano-Forte in which is introduced Prince Aldolphus's Fancy . . . , Op.XII. London, c.1800?.
- Op. 13, 2 Sonatas, pianoforte, violin accompaniment, ?1801.
- – Waltz, pianoforte, ?1801
- – Divertimento, pianoforte, violin accompaniment, ?1811.

== Discography ==
- Music by Maria Hester Park, Marie Bigot, and Fanny Mendelssohn Hensel; Release Date – 8 December 2000; Label – Centaur Records; Catalog – 2320; Performer- Betty Ann Miller
- 18th Century Women Composers: Music For Solo Harpsichord, Volume 1 (Maria Hester Park, Elisabetta de Gambarini, Marianna von Auenbrugg, Marianne (Anna Katharina) von Martínez); Release Date – 22 August 1995; Label – Gasparo Records; Catalog – 272; Performer – Barbara Harbach
- 18th Century Women Composers: Music for Solo Harpsichord, Volume 2 (Maria Hester Park, Elisabetta de Gambarini, Marianna von Auenbrugg, Marianne (Anna Katharina) von Martínez); Release Date – 22 August 1995; Label – Gasparo Records; Catalog – 272; Performer – Barbara Harbach
