= William Thomas Parke =

English oboist and composer

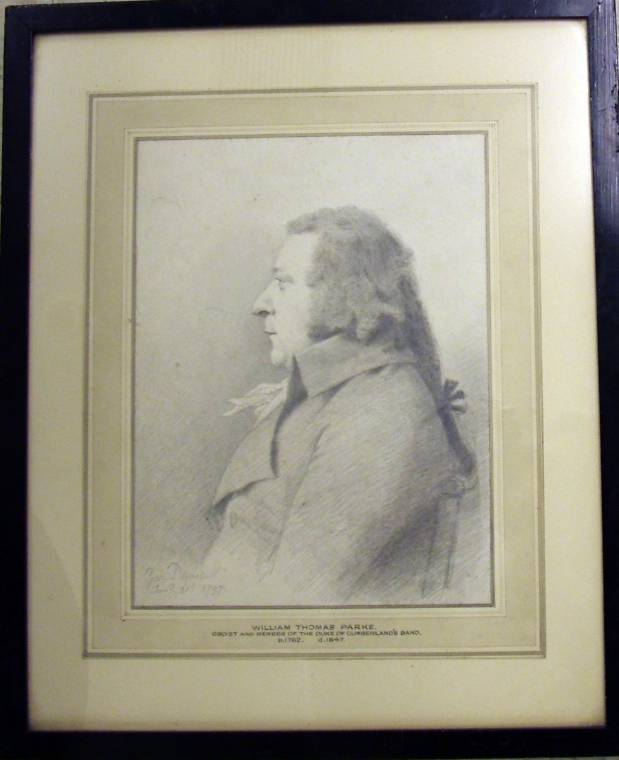
William Thomas Parke (1797)

William Thomas Parke (15 February 1761 – 26 August 1847) was an English oboist and composer. He played in notable concerts of the day; in retirement he published Musical Memoirs.

== Life ==
Parke began his musical studies in 1770 under his elder brother John Parke, learning the flute and the oboe; later from William Dance he studied the violin, from Charles Rousseau Burney the piano, and from Charles Frederick Baumgarten music theory. In 1775–6 Parke sang in the chorus of Drury Lane Theatre, and in 1776 he was regularly engaged there and at Vauxhall Gardens as a viola player.

The oboe especially attracted him; in 1777 he was second oboe at Drury Lane theatre and in 1779 appeared as an oboist at Vauxhall Gardens. In 1783 he became principal oboe at Covent Garden Theatre, succeeding Sharpe. He had not yet attained his brother's eminence, and was called "Little Parke" when he played at the benefit concert of the elder musician. Parke held his post at Covent Garden for forty years, William Shield occasionally writing an effective obbligato for him.

The soprano Margaret Martyr had become his mistress by 1787; they had two sons.

He appeared at the Ladies' Concerts and the Professional Concerts; his playing at the Noblemen's Subscription Concerts won the admiration of the Duke of Cumberland, who became his patron, and commanded his presence at his musical parties in town and country. The Prince of Wales made Parke one of his band at Carlton House, where he met Joseph Haydn.

Parke was one of the original members of a glee club founded in 1793, and he belonged to the Anacreontic Society. He made provincial tours, visiting Birmingham in 1794, Dublin in 1796, Cheltenham in 1800, Portsmouth, Worcester, and other towns. He was principal oboist and concerto player at Vauxhall Gardens from 1800 until 1821.

The Dictionary of National Biography noted that "Parke's tone on the oboe was sweet, his execution brilliant". He extended the compass of the oboe upwards to G, a third higher than former performers had reached.

Parke retired in 1825, and died in London on 24 August 1847. In 1830 he published Musical Memoirs, a valuable record of the period between 1784 and 1830: there are temperate judgements of other musicians, and many anecdotes.

== Compositions ==
Parke's compositions include the overture and a song for Netley Abbey (1794); an adaptation of Dalayrac's Nina; a concerto for the oboe, (about 1789); solo and duets for the flute; and many songs and glees composed for Vauxhall Gardens and the theatres.
