= Park Hotel =

Park Hotel may refer to:

== Hotels ==
=== China ===
- Park Hotel Shanghai, the tallest building in Asia until 1952

=== India ===
- The Park Hotels, chain of Hotels

=== Norway ===
- Scandic Park Hotel, chain hotel in Sandefjord, Norway

=== Singapore ===
- Park Hotel Group, chain of hotels

=== United Kingdom ===
- Park Hotel, Preston

=== United States ===
- Park Hotel (Columbus, Ohio)
- Park Hotel (Hot Springs, Arkansas), listed on the NRHP in Arkansas
- Park Hotel (Sac City, Iowa), listed on the NRHP in Iowa
- Park Hotel (Seguin, Texas), listed on the NRHP in Texas
- Park Hotel (Salt Lake City, Utah), listed on the NRHP in Utah
- Park Hotel and Cabins, listed on the NRHP in Michigan
- Astor House, New York, New York, a hotel previously known as the Park Hotel that was demolished in early 20th century

== Other ==
- Park Hotel (album), a 1986 album by Italian singer-songwriter Alice
- Park Hotels & Resorts, a real estate investment trust

== See also ==
- The Park (disambiguation)
- Park Plaza Hotels & Resorts, a hotel chain once owned by Park Hotels International, LLC
