= Hunt Construction Group =

American construction management company

- Type: Subsidiary
- Industry: Construction Management
- Predecessor: Huber, Hunt & Nichols
- Founded: 1944; 82 years ago
- Founder: Paul B. Hunt; Arber J. Huber; Harry S. Nichols
- Headquarters: 2450 South Tibbs Avenue; Indianapolis, IN 46241, United States
- Number of locations: 6
- Key people: Robert G. Hunt (CEO)
- Owner: Aecom
- Number of employees: 675

Hunt Construction Group is an American construction management firm based in Indianapolis, Indiana. The company was formerly known as Huber, Hunt & Nichols was founded in 1944 by Paul B. Hunt, Arber J. Huber and Harry S. Nichols. The firm changed its name from Huber, Hunt & Nichols to its current name in 2000. It was acquired by AECOM in 2014.

== Notable projects ==
=== Aviation ===
- Denver International Airport South Terminal Development
- Detroit Metropolitan Wayne County Airport Edward H. McNamara Midfield Terminal
- Hartsfield–Jackson Atlanta International Airport Maynard B. Jackson International Terminal
- Indianapolis International Airport Col. H. Weir Cook Terminal
- Phoenix Sky Harbor International Airport Terminal 4

=== Convention centers ===
- Boston Convention and Exhibition Center
- Calvin L. Rampton Salt Palace Convention Center
- Connecticut Convention Center
- Kay Bailey Hutchison Convention Center Expansion
- DeVos Place Convention Center
- Moscone West
- San Jose McEnery Convention Center Expansion

=== Education ===
==== Higher education ====
- Case Western Reserve University Richard F. Celeste Biomedical Research Building
- Case Western Reserve University Kelvin Smith Library
- Case Western Reserve University Peter B. Lewis Building
- Collin County Community College District
- Rose-Hulman Alumni Center
- Rose-Hulman Residence Hall
- Princeton University Lewis Science Library
- Purdue University Philip E. Nelson Hall of Food Science
- Syracuse University Science & Technology Center
- University of California, Berkeley School of Law Infill
- University of California, Berkeley Central Dining & Office Facility
- University of California, Santa Barbara San Clemente Student Apartments
- University of Louisville Dr. Donald E. Baxter Biomedical Research Building
- University of North Texas Environmental Education, Science, and Technology Building
- University of Pittsburgh John G. Rangos School of Health Sciences
- Yale University Rosenkrantz Hall

==== K–12 ====
- Anna May Elementary School
- Boswell High School
- Coyote Ridge Elementary School
- Frisco Lone Star High School
- LaVallita Elementary School
- Mansfield Legacy High School
- Robinswood Middle School
- Lester B. Sommer Elementary School
- Pleasant Hill Elementary School
- Sugar Creek Elementary School

=== Government ===
- Cedar Hill Government Center
- City of Lewisville Library
- Collin County Justice Center
- Major General Emmitt J. Bean Center
- San Francisco Federal Building
- Fresno County Courthouse

=== Healthcare ===
- Carson Tahoe Hospital
- Carson Tahoe Regional Medical Center
- UPMC Children's Hospital of Pittsburgh
- UCSF Helen Diller Family Comprehensive Cancer Center
- Los Angeles County+USC Medical Center
- Methodist Hospital North
- Riley Outpatient Center
- San Antonio Military Medical
- Sequoia Hospital
- VA New Southern Nevada Medical Center

=== Hospitality ===
- Arizona Biltmore Hotel
- Bonnet Creek Resort
- Conrad Hotel Indianapolis
- Grande Lakes Orlando
- Hotel Palomar Phoenix CityScape
- Isleta Resort and Casino
- JW Marriott Complex Indianapolis
- JW Desert Ridge
- Marriott Downtown Louisville
- The Umstead Hotel and Spa
- W Fort Lauderdale

=== Office ===
- Salesforce Tower (Indianapolis)
- CityScape Block 22
- Countrywide at Chandler
- Merrill Lynch at Southfields
- One Liberty Place
- Procter & Gamble Headquarters
- Rosewood Court

=== Performing arts ===
- Charles W. Eisemann Center for Performing Arts
- DeVos Performance Hall
- Globe-News Center for the Performing Arts
- University of North Texas Lucille “Lupe” Murchison Performing Arts Center
- University of Texas of the Permain Wagner Noël Performing Arts Center

=== Sports ===
==== Arenas ====
- Amway Center
- Acrisure Arena
- Amerant Bank Arena
- Barclays Center
- Bell Centre
- The Palace of Mid-America
- College Park Center
- PPG Paints Arena
- Intuit Dome
- KeyBank Center
- Rupp Arena (Original construction and Proposed 2014 Renovation)
- Spectrum Center
- United Center
- The MARK of the Quad Cities (now the Vibrant Arena at The MARK)

==== Stadiums ====
- Oracle Park
- Busch Stadium
- Chase Field
- Citi Field
- Citizens Bank Park
- Los Angeles Memorial Coliseum Renovation (Joint Venture with Hathaway Dinwiddie Construction Company)
- Comerica Park
- Gerald J. Ford Stadium
- Great American Ballpark
- Lucas Oil Stadium
- LoanDepot Park
- Caesars Superdome
- American Family Field
- Nationals Park
- Cardinal Stadium
- Progressive Field
- Pratt & Whitney Stadium at Rentschler Field
- T-Mobile Park
- SoFi Stadium
- Southwest University Park
- Tropicana Field
- State Farm Stadium
- Mercedes-Benz Stadium
- JMA Wireless Dome
