= The Park =

The Park may refer to:

== Art ==
The Park (Klimt), 1909–1910 painting by Gustav Klimt

== Films ==
- The Park (2003 film) (Chow lok yuen), a 2003 horror film directed by Lau Wai Keung
- The Park (2007 film), a 2007 Chinese film

== Games ==
- The Park (video game), a psychological horror experience game

== Literature and comics ==
- The Park (play), a 1983 play by Botho Strauß
- The Park, a comic strip in the British comic Buster

== Places and structures ==
- Páirc Uí Chaoimh, Gaelic games stadium in Cork, Ireland
- The Park at MOA, an amusement park at Mall of America (MOA), in Bloomington, Minnesota, United States
- The Park Centre for Mental Health, a psychiatric hospital in Brisbane, Queensland, Australia
- The Park (Woodlands), the centrepiece of the Woodlands model village in South Yorkshire, England
- The Park Estate, a residential estate in Nottingham, England
- The Park, Burley-on-the-Hill, a cricket venue in Rutland, England
- The Park Hotels, an Indian hotel chain
- Plymouth-Canton Educational Park, a high school campus in Michigan, United States
- Skye (Charlotte), formerly The Park, a 22-story hotel/condominium tower in Charlotte, North Carolina, United States

== See also ==
- Park (disambiguation)
- Park Hotel (disambiguation)
- The Parks (disambiguation)
