= JW Marriott Surabaya =

- Building of JW Marriott Surabaya in 2015
- Interactive map of the JW Marriott Surabaya area

General information
- Status: Completed
- Type: Hotel and Apartment
- Architectural style: Modern
- Location: Jalan Embong Malang 85–89, Surabaya, 60261 Indonesia
- Coordinates: 7.259678°S 112.734729°E
- Completed: 1996
- Opening: 1996
- Owner: Marriott International
- Management: JW Marriott Hotels

Height
- Architectural: 105 m (344.5 ft)

Technical details
- Floor count: 25

Design and construction
- Developer: JW Marriott Hotels

Other information
- Number of rooms: 407
- Number of restaurants: 5

Website
- JW Marriott Surabaya website

The JW Marriott Surabaya, opened in 1996, is a five-star luxury hotel with 25-stories, located at Downtown Tunjungan Surabaya. The restaurant at the hotel serves Chinese, Japanese, and International dishes. the hotel usually has customers from the American or European businessman that stayed in Surabaya.

== History ==
The hotel’s development plan was first conceived in 1992, when James Rachman Radjimin, representing PT Ramasari Surya Persada, signed a management contract with Westin Hotels to establish the brand’s inaugural property in Indonesia, situated in Surabaya. With an estimated investment of Rp200 billion, construction commenced in September 1993 and achieved its topping-off milestone in August 1995. The hotel was built by Decorient, based on architectural designs by Wong & Ouyang, a reputable firm headquartered in Hong Kong. The hotel officially opened as The Westin Surabaya on December 5, 1996, in a formal ceremony attended by Joop Ave, then serving as Minister of Tourism, Post, and Telecommunications. The opening coincided with that of the Majapahit Mandarin Oriental Hotel on Tunjungan Street. At the time, the property competed with the Sheraton Surabaya Hotel & Towers (which later became its sister hotel) and the Surabaya Hilton International (now closed).[1] On 10 June 2002, PT Ramasari Surya Persada ended its partnership with Starwood, which owned the Westin brand at the time, and signed a management agreement with Marriott International as its successor. The property was subsequently rebranded as JW Marriott Hotel Surabaya, becoming the second JW Marriott property in Indonesia after JW Marriott Hotel Jakarta. Years later, in 2016, Marriott International completed its acquisition of Starwood, and the Westin brand later returned to Surabaya with the opening of The Westin Surabaya as part of Pakuwon Mall Surabaya in 2020.
