= The Parks =

The Parks may refer to:

- The Parks, Oxford, a large parkland area slightly northeast of the city centre in Oxford
- The Parks, Godmanchester, a cricket ground in Godmanchester, Huntingdonshire
- The Parks (painting), a 1907 painting by Claude Dalbanne

== See also ==
- Park (disambiguation)
