= JW Marriott San Francisco Union Square =

Hotel in San Francisco, California

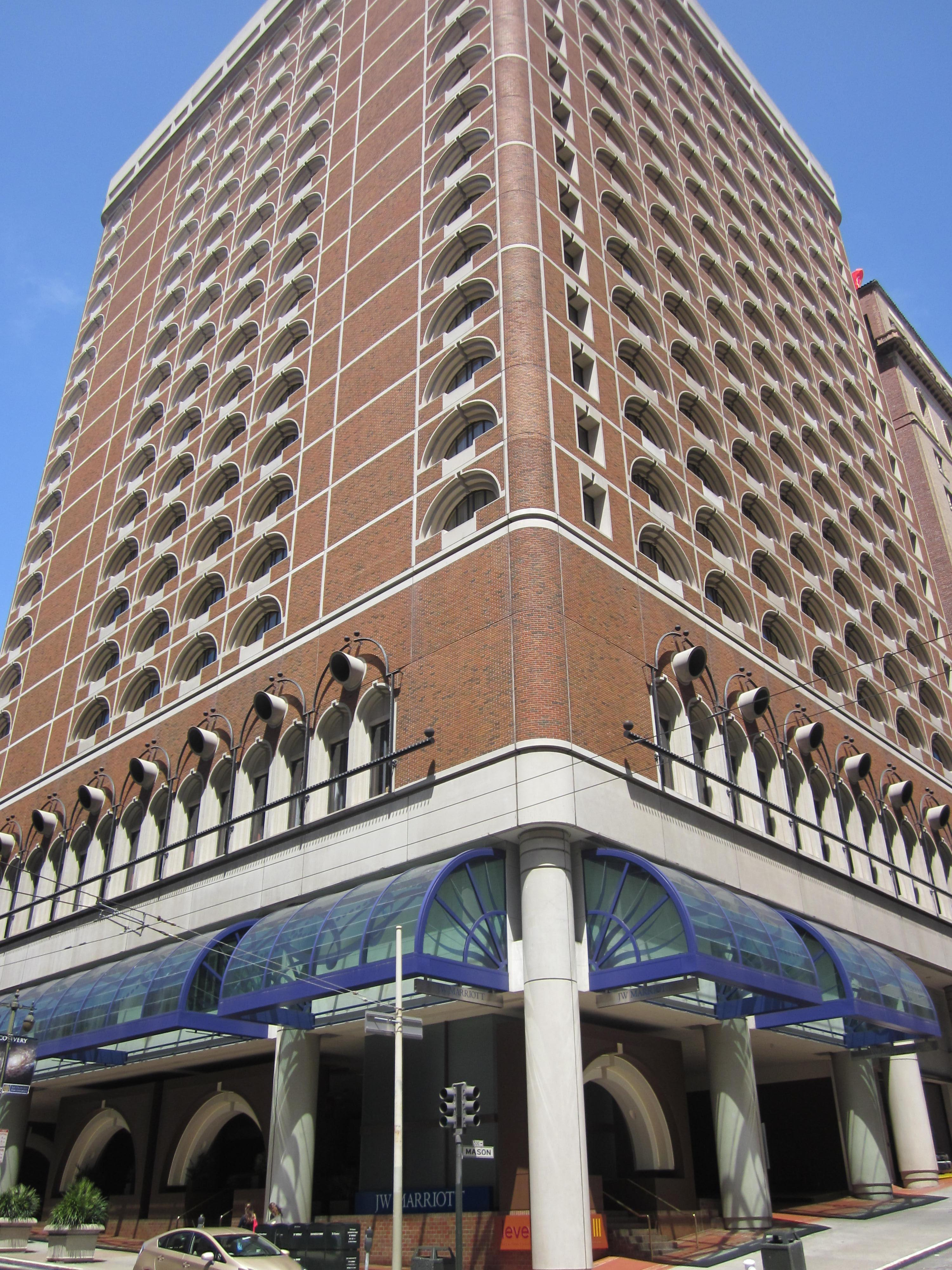

- Location within San Francisco JW Marriott San Francisco Union Square (California) JW Marriott San Francisco Union Square (the United States)
- Hotel chain: JW Marriott

General information
- Location: United States, 500 Post Street; San Francisco, California
- Coordinates: 37.788311°N 122.410460°W
- Opening: 1987
- Owner: Park Hotels & Resorts
- Management: Marriott International

Technical details
- Floor count: 21

Design and construction
- Architect: John Portman & Associates
- Developer: Portman Holdings

Other information
- Number of rooms: 329 rooms
- Number of suites: 8 suites
- Number of restaurants: Level Three Restaurant; Level Three Bar

The JW Marriott San Francisco Union Square is a luxury hotel in San Francisco, California. It is owned by Park Hotels & Resorts.

== History ==
The hotel was designed and built by architect and developer John Portman, and opened in 1987 as The Portman. It was sold on June 1, 1990 to Pan Pacific Hotels, a division of the Tokyu Corporation, which renamed it The Pan Pacific Hotel San Francisco. On August 10, 2003, Tokyu sold the hotel to San Francisco-based Oxford Lodging for $45 million. Pan Pacific was retained to manage the hotel. On February 23, 2006, Oxford sold the hotel to Ashford Hospitality Trust, for $95 million. On April 19, 2006, Ashford announced that they had concluded a management deal with Marriott International, and the hotel was placed in their JW Marriott brand and renamed JW Marriott San Francisco Union Square.

In 2011, Ashford sold the hotel to Thayer Lodging for $96 million. Thayer then sold the property to Chesapeake Lodging Trust in 2014 for $147 million. Chesapeake was acquired by Park Hotels & Resorts in 2019.
