= Hilton New Orleans Riverside =

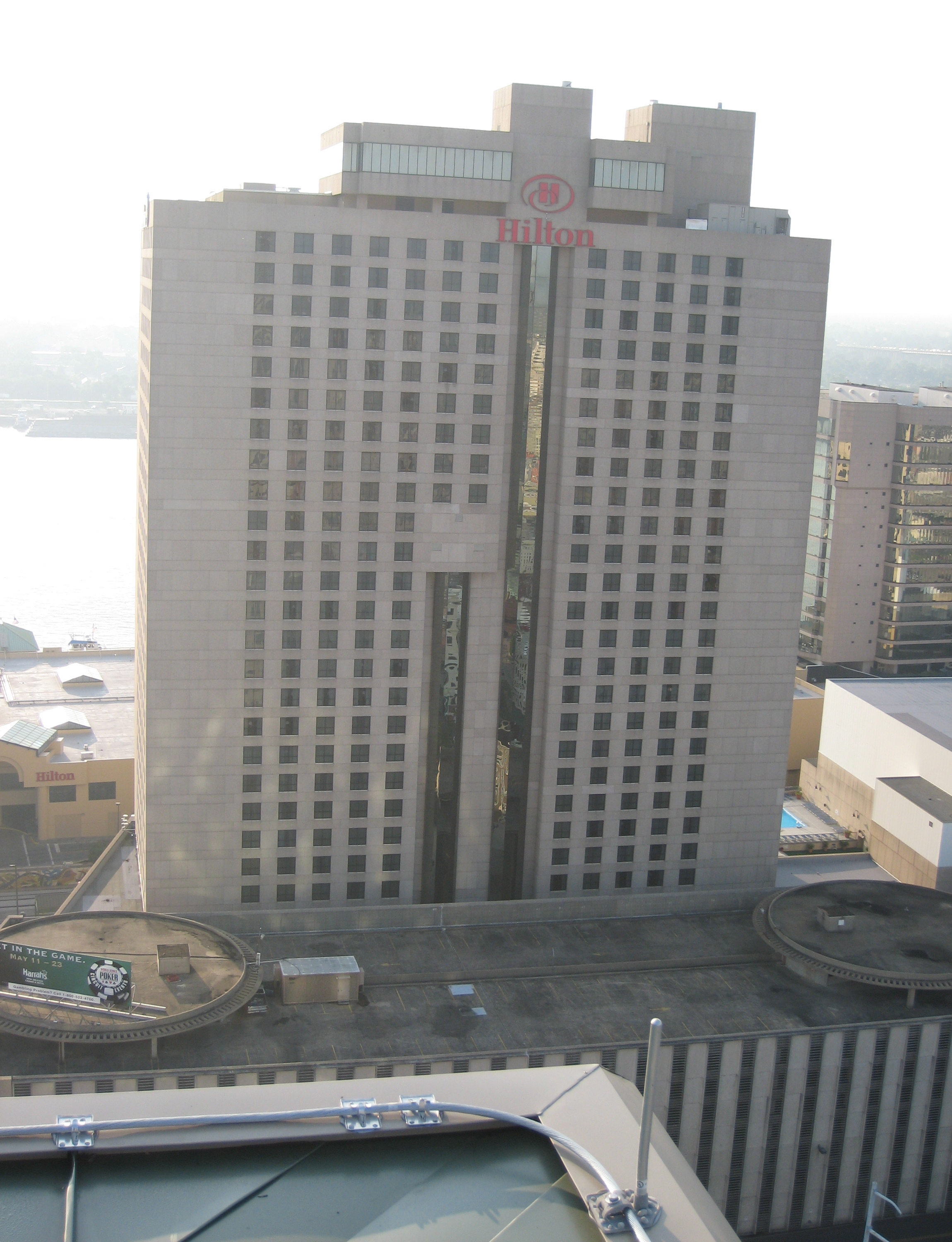
- View of the hotel from a nearby building
- Interactive map of the Hilton New Orleans Riverside area
- Hotel chain: Hilton Hotels & Resorts

General information
- Type: Hotel
- Location: 2 Poydras Street; New Orleans, LA; United States
- Coordinates: 29.947902°N 90.063697°W
- Opened: August 15, 1977
- Owner: Park Hotels & Resorts
- Management: Hilton Worldwide

Height
- Antenna spire: N/A
- Roof: 341 feet (104 m)

Technical details
- Floor count: 29

Other information
- Number of rooms: 1,622

Hilton New Orleans Riverside, located at 2 Poydras Street in the Central Business District of New Orleans, Louisiana, is a 29-story, 341 feet (104 m)-tall skyscraper hotel. The hotel is the city's largest hotel, containing 1,700 rooms. The hotel is owned by Park Hotels & Resorts and is managed by Hilton Worldwide as part of the Hilton Hotels & Resorts chain. A portion of the building complex overlooks the Mississippi River front. The building is connected via an enclosed pedestrian walkway with the adjacent Outlet Collection at Riverwalk, and is located next to the Ernest N. Morial Convention Center.

The hotel opened on August 15, 1977, as the New Orleans Hilton. Musician Pete Fountain had a club where he performed regularly in the Hilton for some 20 years up to 2003.

The hotel was evacuated during Hurricane Katrina. Most people were taken to Baton Rouge, where friends and family waited. Anyone who wasn't able to get picked up by friends or family were taken to other Hilton hotels in Houston, Dallas, San Antonio and Austin, TX. The hotel reportedly sheltered up to 5,000 people during the hurricane.

== See also ==
- List of tallest buildings in New Orleans
- List of tallest buildings in Louisiana
