= Parc 55 San Francisco =

Parc 55 San Francisco - a Hilton Hotel
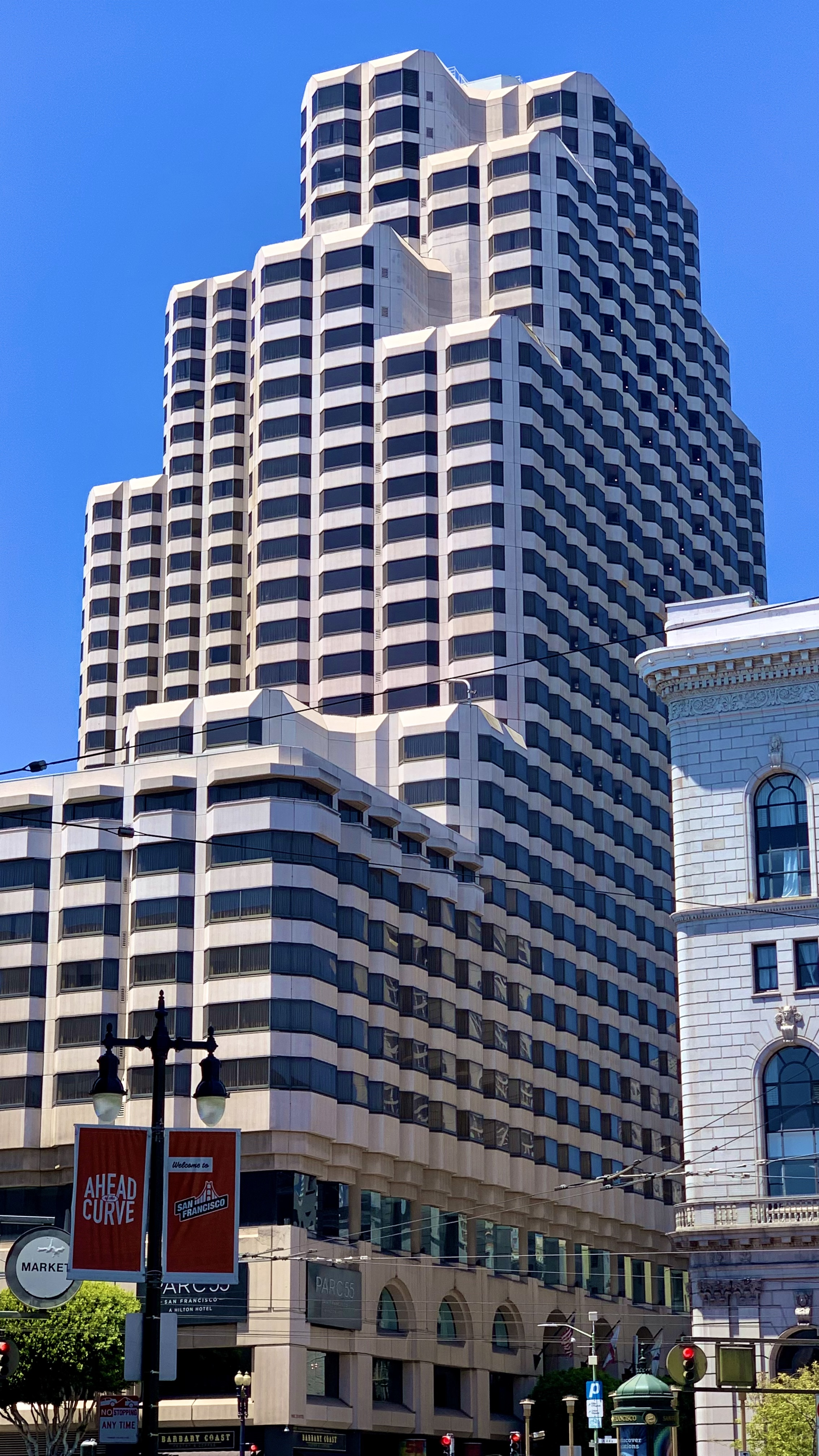
- In 2021

- Location within San Francisco Parc 55 San Francisco (California) Parc 55 San Francisco (the United States)
- Alternative names: Renaissance Parc 55 Hotel
- Hotel chain: Hilton Hotels & Resorts

General information
- Status: Completed
- Type: Hotel
- Location: 55 Cyril Magnin Street; San Francisco, California
- Coordinates: 37.7846°N 122.4089°W
- Completed: 1984
- Owner: Newbond Holdings and Conversant Capital

Height
- Architectural: 350 ft (110 m)
- Roof: 350 ft (110 m)

Technical details
- Floor count: 32
- Floor area: 696,431 sq ft

Design and construction
- Architect: Daniel, Mann, Johnson and Mendenhall

Other information
- Number of units: 1,024
- Parking: 135

Website
- www.hilton.com/en/hotels/sfosfhh-parc-55-san-francisco/

Parc 55 San Francisco - a Hilton Hotel is a 350 ft (107 m) skyscraper hotel located in Tenderloin, San Francisco, California.

== History ==
The Ramada Renaissance Hotel opened in October 1984. Ramada Renaissance was the upscale division of Ramada Inns. The hotel was sold to Oakland developer Larry Chan's Park Lane Hotels in 1989 and renamed the Parc Fifty Five Hotel. On April 30, 1998, the hotel was reflagged as Renaissance Parc 55 Hotel. Renaissance Hotels had separated from Ramada in 1989 and been purchased by Marriott in 1997. The hotel became Marriott's 1500th property worldwide. Boston-based Rockpoint Group and Dallas-based Highgate Holdings bought the hotel from Park Lane Hotels in 2006 for $170 million. The hotel left Marriott on January 15, 2007, and became the Parc 55 Hotel. In April 2010, the hotel joined Wyndham Hotels and was renamed Parc 55 Wyndham San Francisco - Union Square. In 2012, The Blackstone Group took 75 percent ownership of the hotel.

In February 2015, Hilton Worldwide bought the property and renamed it Parc 55 San Francisco - a Hilton Hotel. In 2018, the building was valued at $512.2 million. In June 2023, Park Hotels & Resorts (an investment trust spun off from Hilton Worldwide in 2017) surrendered Parc 55 and the nearby Hilton San Francisco Union Square to its lender JPMorgan Chase, citing San Francisco's "record high office vacancy; concerns over street conditions; lower return to office than peer cities; and a weaker than expected citywide convention calendar". At the request of Wilmington Trust, the entity representing the mortgage lenders, Hotel Value Asset Enhancement being appointed as the receiver for both hotels in October 2023. Hotel Value Asset Enhancement was initially obligated to sell the hotels within 11 months, but a judge later extended the sale deadline.

Following multiple delays, a partnership of Newbond Holdings and Conversant Capital, two New York investment groups, purchased the two hotels in November 2025 for a total of $408 million, more than $1 Billion less than the appraised value of the two properties in 2016.
