= Hilton San Francisco Union Square =

Hotel in San Francisco, California

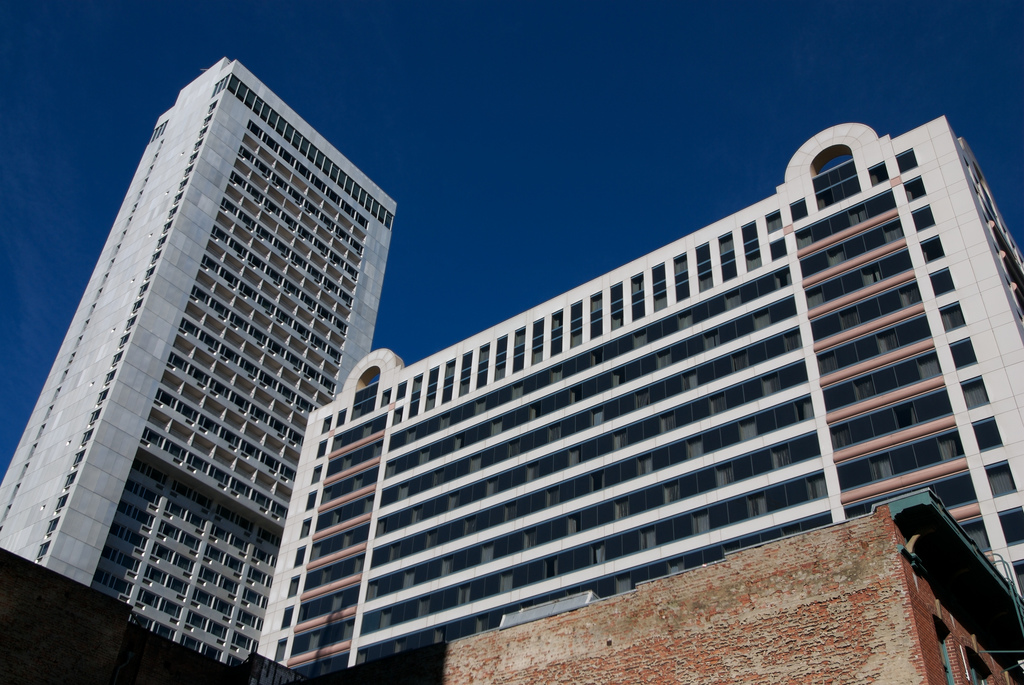
- 1964 wing in foreground, with 1988 facade cladding, and 1971 tower in rear

- Location within San Francisco Hilton San Francisco Union Square (California) Hilton San Francisco Union Square (the United States)
- Hotel chain: Hilton Hotels & Resorts

General information
- Location: United States, 333 O'Farrell Street; San Francisco, California
- Coordinates: 37.7853°N 122.4109°W
- Opening: May 25, 1964
- Owner: Newbond Holdings and Conversant Capital
- Management: Hilton Worldwide

Height
- Height: Tower I: 150.3 m (493 ft); Tower II: 106 m (348 ft)

Technical details
- Floor count: Tower 1: 46 floors Tower 2: 23 floors Tower 3: 19 floors

Design and construction
- Architect: William B. Tabler 1964, John Carl Warnecke and Associates 1985-88

Other information
- Number of rooms: 1,919
- Number of restaurants: 2

Website
- Website

The Hilton San Francisco Union Square is a skyscraper hotel located several blocks south-west of Union Square in San Francisco, California. Opened in 1964, the 18-story, 1200-room original building was known as a "motel within a hotel", allowing guests to park directly next to their upper-story rooms. Filling an entire city block, it remains one of the tallest structures representing Brutalist architecture, though it has been extensively altered since its construction. A second 46-story tower was added in 1971, while a third smaller 23-story connecting tower was completed in 1987. Renovated in 2017, it is the largest hotel on the West Coast, with 1,921 rooms.

== History ==
=== Opening and unique design ===
The hotel opened on May 25, 1964, as the San Francisco Hilton. Built at a cost of $29 million and designed by architect William B. Tabler, the 18-story, 1200-room structure was known as a motel within a hotel due to a design featuring a series of ramps in the middle of the building, allowing guests to drive their cars directly to seven of the hotel's lower floors and park adjacent to their room. Tabler's design also employed a checkerboard facade of windows and decorative panels to disguise the building's earthquake bracing. It was the 60th Hilton hotel in the company's worldwide operations.

In the original building, there was no 13th floor, while the 12th to the 15th floors housed mechanical equipment. Floors 16 to 19 contained guest rooms, overlooking an inner courtyard and garden on the 16th floor, with a landscaped plaza and a swimming pool and cabana-style rooms. There was also a heated garden court and sunbathing areas. There were a number of restaurants and bars on the lobby floor, including a Cafe Bellagio. It also had one of the world's largest ballrooms at the time, which was reached by escalators from the lobby to the floor below, handling a banquet of 2000 or a meeting for 3000. Sliding partitions allowed the space to be divided into nine soundproof rooms, each with lighting and television and projection booths. Thirteen private dining rooms were on the floor above the ballroom, with the entire facility focused on conventions. On the 19th floor were two suites, each with a living room and two bedrooms, with a spiral stairway leading to a penthouse solarium for parties of 100 or more. If the suites were not spoken for, Hilton said it would rent them for $200 a day. Room rates were $12 to $23 a day for singles, and $18 to $27 for doubles. The hotel was built by Cahill Brothers, Inc. in San Francisco, with David T. Williams, Inc. of New York handled the decorating.

The Beatles stayed at the San Francisco Hilton during their 1964 US tour, opening their tour at San Francisco on August 18 after staying the night before at the Hilton Hotel.

The San Francisco Hilton's distinctive parking layout is featured in the 1968 film Petulia, filmed in part at the hotel.

=== Second tower ===
The 46-story, 493 ft (150 m) Hilton Tower addition was completed in 1971, joined to the original wing by a skybridge. Due to the hotel addition's height, this makes it the tallest building in San Francisco to be located outside both the Financial District and the South of Market District.

The hotel was featured in the 1972 screwball comedy What's Up Doc?, where the main characters stay at a Hotel Bristol hosting a music convention. Filming took place in the new 46-story skyscraper hotel, with the lobby, drugstore, ballroom, seventeenth floor, and partly-finished top floor all filling the first hour of the film.

In March 1985, Hilton was refused permission to open a casino property in Atlantic City, with the New Jersey Casino Control Commission in part citing that "reputed members of organized crime had frequented the San Francisco Hilton and had been seen coming and going at the office of Henri Lewin, a Hilton executive vice president....Werner Lewin, a Hilton vice president and general manager of the San Francisco Hilton, asked Hilton employees to destroy records because of a pending Federal antitrust investigation," which had found "associations with individuals of the most alarming type."

=== Third tower and renovations ===
From 1985–1988, the hotel was completely rebuilt at a cost of $150 million, to designs by architect John Carl Warnecke, with the addition of a 26-story 348 ft (106 m) third tower, connecting the two original towers, and rehabilitation of the first five levels of the Hilton Plaza. Tabler's original checkerboard facade was removed and replaced with a more contemporary post-modern facade to match the new wing.

Between 2011 and 2017, the hotel underwent a $130 million overhaul, including noise-canceling windows and doors in guest rooms. The renovation was finished in 2017, with updates in Tower Two. It is the largest hotel on the West Coast.

=== Surrender of building ===
In June 2023, Park Hotels & Resorts (an investment trust spun off from Hilton Worldwide in 2017) surrendered Hilton San Francisco Union Square and the nearby Parc 55 San Francisco to its lender JPMorgan Chase, citing San Francisco's "record high office vacancy; concerns over street conditions; lower return to office than peer cities; and a weaker than expected citywide convention calendar." At the request of Wilmington Trust, the entity representing the mortgage lenders, Hotel Value Asset Enhancement being appointed as the receiver for both hotels in October 2023. Hotel Value Asset Enhancement was initially obligated to sell the hotels within 11 months, but a judge later extended the sale deadline. Following multiple delays, Newbond and Conversant, two companies from New York, agreed to buy the two hotels in September 2025.

=== 2024 strike ===
In September 2024, employees at the Hilton San Francisco Union Square hotel went on strike. On December 24, 2024, a four-year labor agreement was ratified, thus bringing the strike to an end. The Hilton San Francisco Union Square was the last of numerous San Francisco-area hotels which saw workers go on strike in 2024 to reach a labor agreement.

=== 2025 sale ===
The Hilton San Francisco Union Square and the Parc 55 San Francisco were jointly purchased by a partnership of investment groups Newbond Holdings and Conversant Capital in November 2025 for a total of $408 million, more than $1 Billion less than the appraised value of the two properties in 2016.

== See also ==
- San Francisco's tallest buildings
