= Park Hotels & Resorts =

Hotel real estate investment trust

Park Hotels & Resorts Inc.
- Type: Public company
- Traded as: NYSE: PK; S&P 400 component Russell 2000 Index component
- Industry: Real estate investment trust Hotels
- Founded: January 4, 2017; 9 years ago
- Headquarters: Tysons, Virginia
- Key people: Thomas J. Baltimore, Jr. (Chairman & CEO)
- Revenue: ▼$2.541 billion (2025)
- Net income: ▼ -$283 million (2025)
- Total assets: ▼$7.700 billion (2025)
- Total equity: ▼$3.076 billion (2025)
- Number of employees: 90 (2025)
- Website: www.pkhotelsandresorts.com

Park Hotels & Resorts is an American real estate investment trust (REIT) focused on hotel properties, based in Tysons, Virginia. It was formed in 2017 as a spin-off from Hilton Worldwide.

== History ==
In January 2017, Hilton Worldwide completed the corporate spin-off of its real estate assets into Park Hotels & Resorts to take advantage of the lack of corporate income taxes on real estate investment trusts and to enable Hilton to have an asset-light business model. Park Hotels became the second-largest publicly traded hotel REIT, with holdings of 67 hotels.

In 2018, Park Hotels sold 13 hotels that it considered "non-core" assets, including 10 of its 14 international properties, for a total of $519 million.

In March 2018, HNA Group, which had owned 25% of the company after it purchased 25% of Hilton Worldwide in 2016, sold all its shares for $1.4 billion.

In 2019, Park acquired Chesapeake Lodging Trust for $1 billion in cash plus $978 million in stock. The purchase added eighteen hotels to Park's portfolio, and diversified it by adding hotel brands franchised from Marriott, Hyatt, and others.

The company sold 10 hotels in 2019 and 2020, including its last properties outside of the United States, sold 5 hotels in 2021, and sold 4 hotels in 2022.

In 2023, the company placed two of its San Francisco hotels, the Hilton San Francisco Union Square and Parc 55 San Francisco, into receivership, effectively surrendering them to the mortgage holder for a deed in lieu of foreclosure, because of poor revenue projections and reduced property value.

== Properties ==
Park Hotels & Resorts has whole or partial ownership of 34 hotels, containing 23,000 rooms. Most hotels operate under brands licensed from Hilton Worldwide, including Hilton, DoubleTree, Embassy Suites, and Curio. The hotels are managed by other companies, most of them by Hilton Worldwide.

Notable hotels owned by the company include:

- Caribe Hilton – San Juan, Puerto Rico
- Hilton Chicago – Chicago, Illinois
- Hilton Hawaiian Village – Honolulu, Hawaii
- Hilton New Orleans Riverside – New Orleans, Louisiana
- Hilton Orlando Lake Buena Vista – Lake Buena Vista, Florida
- Hilton Waikoloa Village – Puako, Hawaii
- JW Marriott San Francisco Union Square – San Francisco, California
- New York Hilton Midtown – Manhattan, New York
- Signia by Hilton Orlando Bonnet Creek – Orlando, Florida
- Waldorf Astoria Orlando – Orlando, Florida

=== Former properties ===
- Ace Hotel Los Angeles — Los Angeles, California – Sold in 2019
- Capital Hilton – Washington, DC (25% interest) – Sold in 2025
- Embassy Suites Washington, D.C. – Washington, DC — Sold in 2020 for $90.4 million
- Hilton San Diego Bayfront – San Diego, California (25% interest) — Sold in 2022
- Le Méridien New Orleans — New Orleans, Louisiana — Sold in January 2020
- Le Méridien San Francisco – San Francisco, California — Acquired in 2019 and sold in 2021
- Hilton San Francisco Union Square – San Francisco, California — Surrendered to lender in 2023
- Parc 55 San Francisco – San Francisco, California — Acquired in 2015 and surrendered to lender in 2023
