= JW Marriott Hotels =

American hotel brand

JW Marriott
- Industry: Hospitality
- Founded: 1984; 42 years ago
- Headquarters: Bethesda, Maryland, U.S.
- Number of locations: 121 (2023)
- Services: Luxury hotels
- Parent: Marriott International
- Website: Official website

JW Marriott is an American brand of luxury hotels that is owned by Marriott International.

== History ==
The JW Marriott brand was established in 1984, with the opening of the first hotel in Washington, D.C. It was named as a tribute to J.W. Marriott, the founder of Marriott Corporation. In 1989, Hong Kong was the destination for the overseas launch. Europe and the Middle East followed in 1993. As a general guide within the Marriott hierarchy, the brand competes in the luxury area, below the Ritz-Carlton, but above the traditional Marriott and Renaissance brands.

The JW Marriott Jakarta experienced terrorist bombings in 2003 and 2009. In the 2003 attack, a car bomb exploded outside the lobby killing 12 people and injuring 150. Despite extensive damage, the hotel reopened five weeks later. In the 2009 attack, a bomb in a small breakfast room caused six deaths. An unexploded bomb in a guest room failed to detonate.

== Accommodations ==
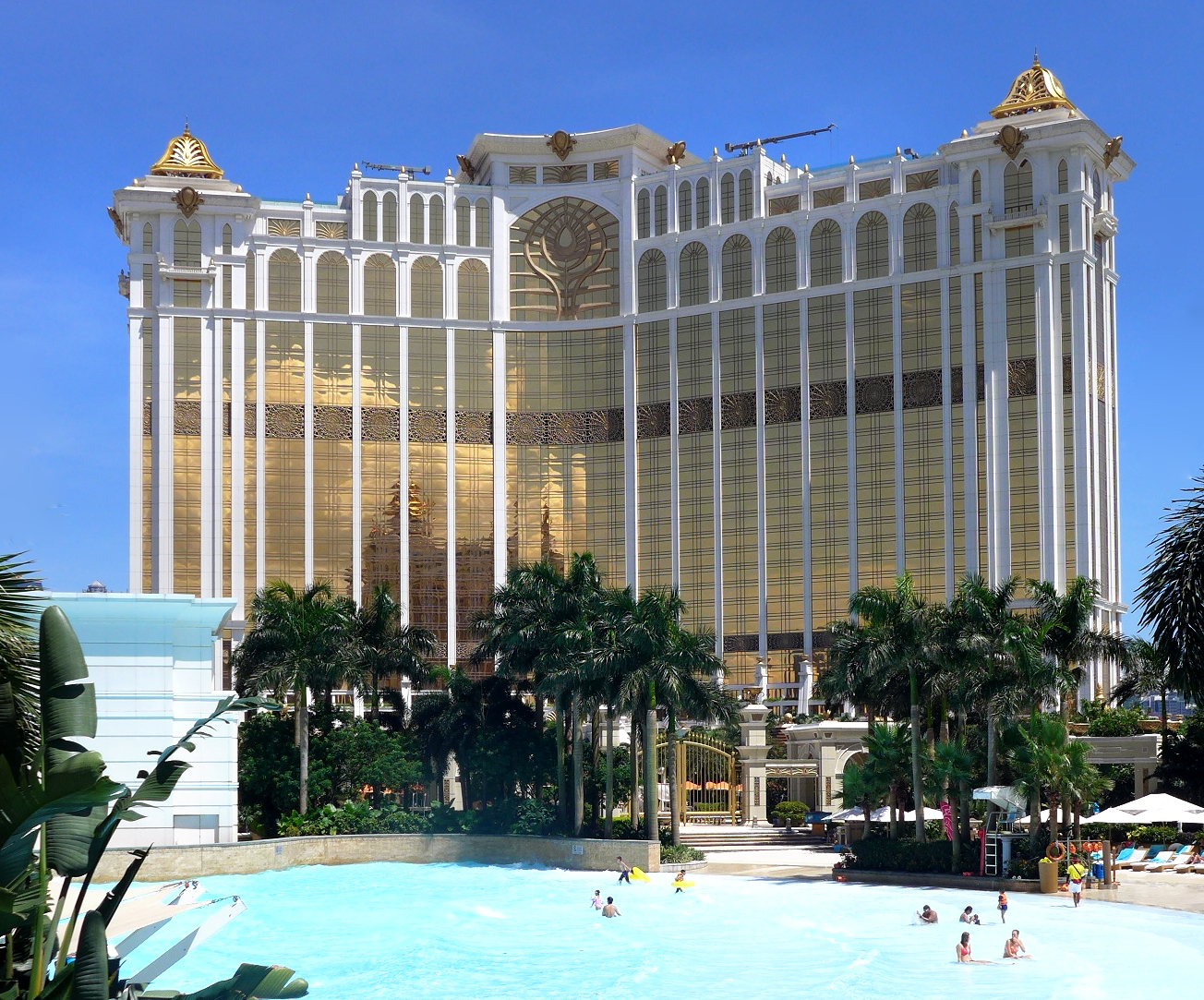
JW Marriott Macau

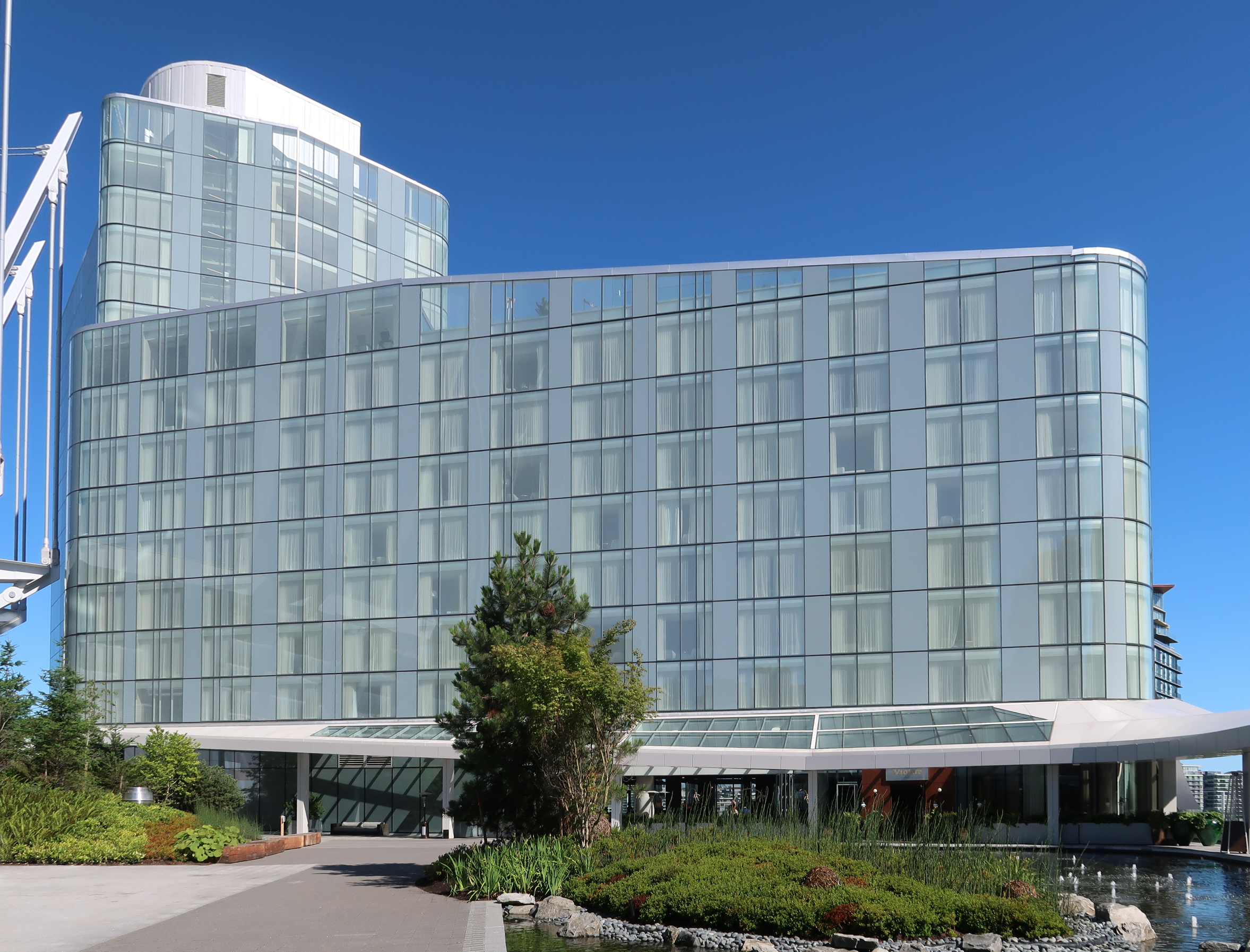
JW Marriott in Vancouver

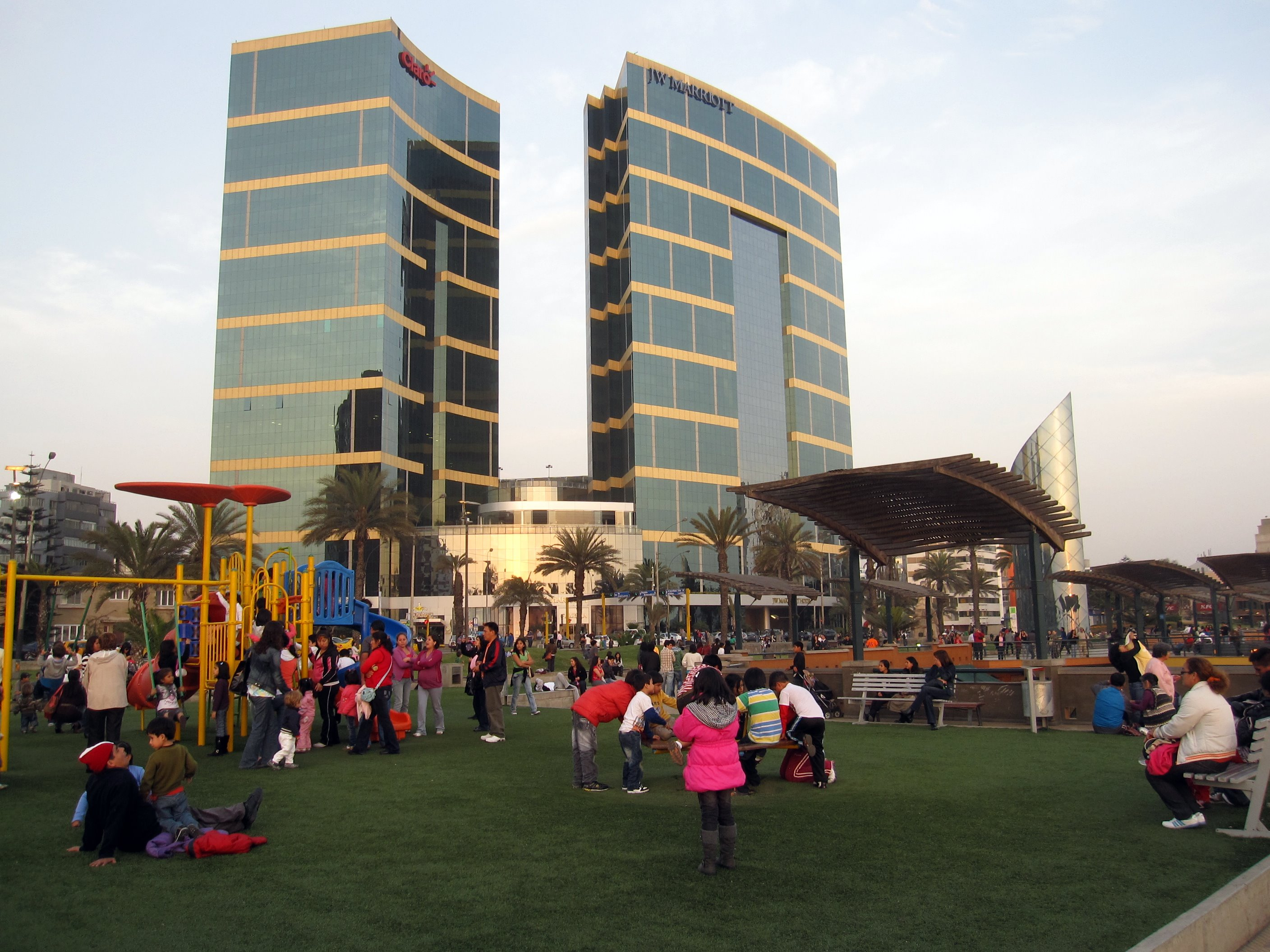
JW Marriott in Lima

=== Historical ===
| | | US | Non-US | Total |
|---|---|---|---|---|
| 2007 | Properties | 16 | 22 | 38 |
| 2007 | Rooms | 8,288 | 8,244 | 16,532 |
| 2008 | Properties | 16 | 26 | 42 |
| 2008 | Rooms | 8,288 | 9,208 | 17,496 |
| 2009 | Properties | 16 | 27 | 43 |
| 2009 | Rooms | 8,289 | 10,174 | 18,463 |
| 2010 | Properties | 20 | 29 | 49 |
| 2010 | Rooms | 11,135 | 10,852 | 21,987 |
| 2011 | Properties | 21 | 32 | 53 |
| 2011 | Rooms | 12,140 | 11,686 | 23,826 |
| 2012 | Properties | 22 | 37 | 59 |
| 2012 | Rooms | 12,649 | 13,144 | 25,793 |
| 2013 | Properties | 22 | 41 | 63 |
| 2013 | Rooms | 12,649 | 14,828 | 27,477 |
| 2014 | Properties | 23 | 46 | 69 |
| 2014 | Rooms | 12,974 | 16,893 | 29,867 |

=== From 2015 ===
| | | North America | Europe | Middle E. & Africa | Asia & Pacific | Caribbean Latin Am. | Total |
|---|---|---|---|---|---|---|---|
| 2015 | Properties | 25 | 6 | 4 | 29 | 13 | 77 |
| 2015 | Rooms | 14,159 | 2,065 | 2,708 | 11,764 | 3,346 | 34,042 |
| 2016 | Properties | 25 | 6 | 4 | 32 | 13 | 80 |
| 2016 | Rooms | 14,164 | 2,075 | 2,708 | 13,034 | 3,346 | 35,327 |
| 2017 | Properties | 26 | 6 | 4 | 33 | 12 | 81 |
| 2017 | Rooms | 14,484 | 2,075 | 2,708 | 13,234 | 3,228 | 35,729 |
| 2018 | Properties | 28 | 6 | 4 | 33 | 13 | 84 |
| 2018 | Rooms | 15,681 | 2,075 | 2,708 | 13,122 | 3,597 | 37,183 |
| 2019 | Properties | 30 | 7 | 6 | 40 | 13 | 96 |
| 2019 | Rooms | 16,853 | 2,205 | 3,327 | 15,080 | 3,597 | 41,062 |
| 2020 | Properties | 34 | 7 | 6 | 42 | 13 | 102 |
| 2020 | Rooms | 18,658 | 2,205 | 3,325 | 15,574 | 3,597 | 43,359 |
| 2021 | Properties | 35 | 6 | 9 | 43 | 14 | 107 |
| 2021 | Rooms | 19,155 | 2,169 | 4,039 | 15,846 | 3,847 | 45,056 |
| 2022 | Properties | 33 | 7 | 10 | 47 | 16 | 113 |
| 2022 | Rooms | 18,796 | 2,387 | 4,247 | 17,009 | 4,296 | 46,735 |
| 2023 | Properties | 35 | 8 | 11 | 51 | 16 | 121 |
| 2023 | Rooms | 19,261 | 2,523 | 4,299 | 18,051 | 4,296 | 48,430 |

== Properties ==
As of April 2023, there are 100 hotels and resorts with 42,602 rooms open and operating, in addition to 40 hotels with 17,041 rooms in the pipeline, under the brand:

North America

North America
| No. | Name | Location | Country | Opening Year |
|---|---|---|---|---|
| 1 | JW Marriott Anaheim Resort | Anaheim | United States | 2020 |
| 2 | JW Marriott Atlanta Buckhead | Atlanta | United States | 1988 |
| 3 | JW Marriott Austin | Austin | United States | 2015 |
| 4 | JW Marriott Charlotte | Charlotte | United States | 2021 |
| 5 | JW Marriott Chicago | Chicago | United States | 2010 |
| 6 | JW Marriott Clearwater Beach Resort & Spa | Clearwater | United States | 2023 |
| 7 | JW Marriott Dallas Arts District | Dallas | United States | 2023 |
| 8 | JW Marriott Desert Springs Resort & Spa | Palm Desert | United States | 2002 |
| 9 | JW Marriott Edmonton ICE District | Edmonton | Canada | 2019 |
| 10 | JW Marriott Essex House New York | New York City | United States | 2012 |
| 11 | JW Marriott Grand Rapids | Grand Rapids | United States | 2007 |
| 12 | JW Marriott Houston by The Galleria | Houston | United States | 1984 |
| 13 | JW Marriott Houston Downtown | Houston | United States | 2014 |
| 14 | JW Marriott Indianapolis | Indianapolis | United States | 2011 |
| 15 | JW Marriott Las Vegas Resort & Spa | Las Vegas | United States | 2001 |
| 16 | JW Marriott Los Angeles L.A. LIVE | Los Angeles | United States | 2010 |
| 17 | JW Marriott Marco Island Beach Resort | Marco Island | United States | 2017 |
| 18 | JW Marriott Marquis Miami | Miami | United States | 2010 |
| 19 | JW Marriott Miami | Miami | United States | 2000 |
| 20 | JW Marriott Miami Turnberry Resort & Spa | Aventura | United States | 2019 |
| 21 | JW Marriott Minneapolis Mall of America | Bloomington | United States | 2015 |
| 22 | JW Marriott Nashville | Nashville | United States | 2018 |
| 23 | JW Marriott New Orleans | New Orleans | United States | 2003 |
| 24 | JW Marriott Orlando Bonnet Creek Resort & Spa | Orange County | United States | 2020 |
| 25 | JW Marriott Orlando Grande Lakes | Orange County | United States | 2003 |
| 26 | JW Marriott Parq Vancouver | Vancouver | Canada | 2017 |
| 27 | JW Marriott Phoenix Desert Ridge Resort & Spa | Phoenix | United States | 2002 |
| 28 | JW Marriott San Antonio Hill Country Resort & Spa | Bexar County | United States | 2010 |
| 29 | JW Marriott San Francisco Union Square | San Francisco | United States | 2006 |
| 30 | JW Marriott Savannah Plant Riverside District | Savannah | United States | 2020 |
| 31 | JW Marriott Scottsdale Camelback Inn Resort & Spa | Paradise Valley | United States | 2003 |
| 32 | JW Marriott Tampa Water Street | Tampa | United States | 2020 |
| 33 | JW Marriott The Rosseau Muskoka Resort & Spa | Muskoka Lakes | Canada | 2008 |
| 34 | JW Marriott Tucson Starr Pass Resort & Spa | Tucson | United States | 2005 |
| 35 | JW Marriott Washington, DC | Washington, D.C. | United States | 1984 |

Central America and Caribbean

Central America and Caribbean
| No. | Name | Location | Country | Opening Year |
|---|---|---|---|---|
| 1 | Casa Maat at JW Marriott Los Cabos Beach Resort & Spa | San José del Cabo | Mexico | 2022 |
| 2 | JW Marriott Cancun Resort & Spa | Cancún | Mexico | 2001 |
| 3 | JW Marriott Guanacaste Resort & Spa | Guanacaste | Costa Rica | 2008 |
| 4 | JW Marriott Hotel Caracas | Caracas | Venezuela | 2002 |
| 5 | JW Marriott Hotel Guadalajara | Guadalajara | Mexico | 2022 |
| 6 | JW Marriott Hotel Mexico City Polanco | Mexico City | Mexico | 1996 |
| 7 | JW Marriott Hotel Mexico City Santa Fe | Mexico City | Mexico | 2012 |
| 8 | JW Marriott Hotel Monterrey Valle | San Pedro Garza García | Mexico | 2021 |
| 9 | JW Marriott Hotel Santo Domingo | Santo Domingo | Dominican Republic | 2014 |
| 10 | JW Marriott Los Cabos Beach Resort & Spa | San José del Cabo | Mexico | 2015 |
| 11 | JW Marriott Panama | Panama City | Panama | 2018 |
| 12 | JW Marriott St. Maarten Beach Resort & Spa | Sint Maarten | Netherlands | 2024 |

South America

South America
| No. | Name | Location | Country | Opening Year |
|---|---|---|---|---|
| 1 | JW Marriott El Convento Cusco | Cusco | Peru | 2012 |
| 2 | JW Marriott Hotel Bogota | Bogotá | Colombia | 2010 |
| 3 | JW Marriott Hotel Lima | Lima | Peru | 2000 |
| 4 | JW Marriott Hotel Rio de Janeiro | Rio de Janeiro | Brazil | 2001 |
| 5 | JW Marriott Hotel Sao Paulo | São Paulo | Brazil | 2022 |
| 6 | JW Marriott Quito | Quito | Ecuador | 1999 |

Europe

Europe
| No. | Name | Location | Country | Opening Year |
|---|---|---|---|---|
| 1 | JW Marriott Bucharest Grand Hotel | Bucharest | Romania | 2004 |
| 2 | JW Marriott Cannes | Cannes | France | 2011 |
| 3 | JW Marriott Grosvenor House London | London | United Kingdom | 2008 |
| 4 | JW Marriott Hotel Ankara | Ankara | Turkey | 2011 |
| 5 | JW Marriott Hotel Berlin | Berlin | Germany | 2023 |
| 6 | JW Marriott Hotel Frankfurt | Frankfurt | Germany | 2022 |
| 7 | JW Marriott Hotel Istanbul Marmara Sea | Istanbul | Turkey | 2022 |
| 8 | JW Marriott Hotel Madrid | Madrid | Spain | 2023 |
| 9 | JW Marriott Istanbul Bosphorus | Istanbul | Turkey | 2019 |
| 10 | JW Marriott Venice Resort & Spa | Venice | Italy | 2015 |

Middle East

Middle East
| No. | Name | Location | Country | Opening Year |
|---|---|---|---|---|
| 1 | JW Marriott Hotel Kuwait City | Kuwait City | Kuwait | 2003 |
| 2 | JW Marriott Hotel Marina | Dubai | United Arab Emirates | 2024 |
| 3 | JW Marriott Hotel Muscat | Muscat | Oman | 2019 |
| 4 | JW Marriott Hotel Riyadh | Riyadh | Saudi Arabia | 2022 |
| 5 | JW Marriott Marquis City Center Doha | Doha | Qatar | 2019 |
| 6 | JW Marriott Marquis Hotel Dubai | Dubai | United Arab Emirates | 2012 |

Africa

Africa
| No. | Name | Location | Country | Opening Year |
|---|---|---|---|---|
| 1 | JW Marriott Hotel Cairo | New Cairo | Egypt | 2003 |
| 2 | JW Marriott Hotel Nairobi | Nairobi | Kenya | 2024 |
| 3 | JW Marriott Masai Mara Lodge | Maasai Mara | Kenya | 2023 |
| 4 | JW Marriott Mauritius Resort | Le Morne Brabant | Mauritius | 2021 |

Asia

Asia
| No. | Name | Location | Country | Opening Year |
|---|---|---|---|---|
| 1 | JW Marriott Absheron Baku | Baku | Azerbaijan | 2012 |
| 2 | JW Marriott Bengaluru Prestige Golfshire Resort & Spa | Bangalore | India | 2022 |
| 3 | JW Marriott Dongdaemun Square Seoul | Seoul | South Korea | 2014 |
| 4 | JW Marriott Goa | Goa | India | 2023 |
| 5 | JW Marriott Hotel & Suites Saigon | Ho Chi Minh City | Vietnam | 2024 |
| 6 | JW Marriott Hotel Bangkok | Bangkok | Thailand | 1997 |
| 7 | JW Marriott Hotel Beijing | Beijing | China | 2007 |
| 8 | JW Marriott Hotel Beijing Central | Beijing | China | 2014 |
| 9 | JW Marriott Hotel Bengaluru | Bangalore | India | 2013 |
| 10 | JW Marriott Hotel Chandigarh | Chandigarh | India | 2011 |
| 11 | JW Marriott Hotel Changsha | Changsha | China | 2022 |
| 12 | JW Marriott Hotel Chengdu | Chengdu | China | 2016 |
| 13 | JW Marriott Hotel Chongqing | Chongqing | China | 2014 |
| 14 | JW Marriott Hotel Hangzhou | Hangzhou | China | 2010 |
| 15 | JW Marriott Hotel Hanoi | Hanoi | Vietnam | 2013 |
| 16 | JW Marriott Hotel Harbin River North | Harbin | China | 2019 |
| 17 | JW Marriott Hotel Hong Kong | Hong Kong | China | 1989 |
| 18 | JW Marriott Hotel Jakarta | Jakarta | Indonesia | 2001 |
| 19 | JW Marriott Hotel Kolkata | Kolkata | India | 2016 |
| 20 | JW Marriott Hotel Kuala Lumpur | Kuala Lumpur | Malaysia | 1997 |
| 21 | JW Marriott Hotel Macau | Macau | China | 2015 |
| 22 | JW Marriott Hotel Medan | Medan | Indonesia | 2009 |
| 23 | JW Marriott Hotel Nara | Nara | Japan | 2020 |
| 24 | JW Marriott Hotel New Delhi Aerocity | New Delhi | India | 2013 |
| 25 | JW Marriott Hotel Pune | Pune | India | 2013 |
| 26 | JW Marriott Hotel Qufu | Jining | China | 2019 |
| 27 | JW Marriott Hotel Sanya Dadonghai Bay | Sanya | China | 2019 |
| 28 | JW Marriott Hotel Seoul | Seoul | South Korea | 2000 |
| 29 | JW Marriott Hotel Shanghai at Tomorrow Square | Shanghai | China | 2003 |
| 30 | JW Marriott Hotel Shanghai Fengxian | Shanghai | China | 2021 |
| 31 | JW Marriott Hotel Shanghai Changfeng Park | Shanghai | China | 2015 |
| 32 | JW Marriott Hotel Shenzhen | Shenzhen | China | 2009 |
| 33 | JW Marriott Hotel Shenzhen Bao'an | Shenzhen | China | 2014 |
| 34 | JW Marriott Hotel Singapore South Beach | Singapore | Singapore | 2016 |
| 35 | JW Marriott Hotel Surabaya | Surabaya | Indonesia | 2002 |
| 36 | JW Marriott Hotel Tokyo | Tokyo | Japan | 2025 |
| 37 | JW Marriott Hotel Xi'an | Xi'an | China | 2023 |
| 38 | JW Marriott Hotel Xi'an Southwest | Xi'an | China | 2023 |
| 39 | JW Marriott Hotel Yinchuan | Yinchuan | China | 2020 |
| 40 | JW Marriott Hotel Zhejiang Anji | Huzhou | China | 2015 |
| 41 | JW Marriott Hotel Zhengzhou | Zhengzhou | China | 2014 |
| 42 | JW Marriott Jeju Resort & Spa | Jeju Island | South Korea | 2023 |
| 43 | JW Marriott Khao Lak Resort & Spa | Khao Lak | Thailand | 2009 |
| 44 | JW Marriott Khao Lak Resort Suites | Khao Lak | Thailand | 2022 |
| 45 | JW Marriott Maldives Resort & Spa | Shaviyani Atoll | Maldives | 2019 |
| 46 | JW Marriott Marquis Hotel Shanghai Pudong | Shanghai | China | 2019 |
| 47 | JW Marriott Mumbai Juhu | Mumbai | India | 2002 |
| 48 | JW Marriott Mumbai Sahar | Mumbai | India | 2015 |
| 49 | JW Marriott Mussoorie Walnut Grove Resort & Spa | Mussoorie | India | 2014 |
| 50 | JW Marriott Phu Quoc Emerald Bay Resort & Spa | Phú Quốc | Vietnam | 2017 |
| 51 | JW Marriott Phuket Resort & Spa | Phuket | Thailand | 2001 |
| 52 | JW Marriott Sanya Haitang Bay Resort & Spa | Sanya | China | 2019 |
| 53 | JW Marriott Hotel Johor Bahru | Johor Bahru | Malaysia | 2026 |

Australia and Pacific

Australia and Pacific
| No. | Name | Location | Country | Opening Year |
|---|---|---|---|---|
| 1 | JW Marriott Auckland | Auckland | New Zealand | 2022 |
| 2 | JW Marriott Gold Coast Resort & Spa | Gold Coast | Australia | 2020 |

== Gallery ==
JW Marriott Absheron hotel in Baku, Azerbaijan

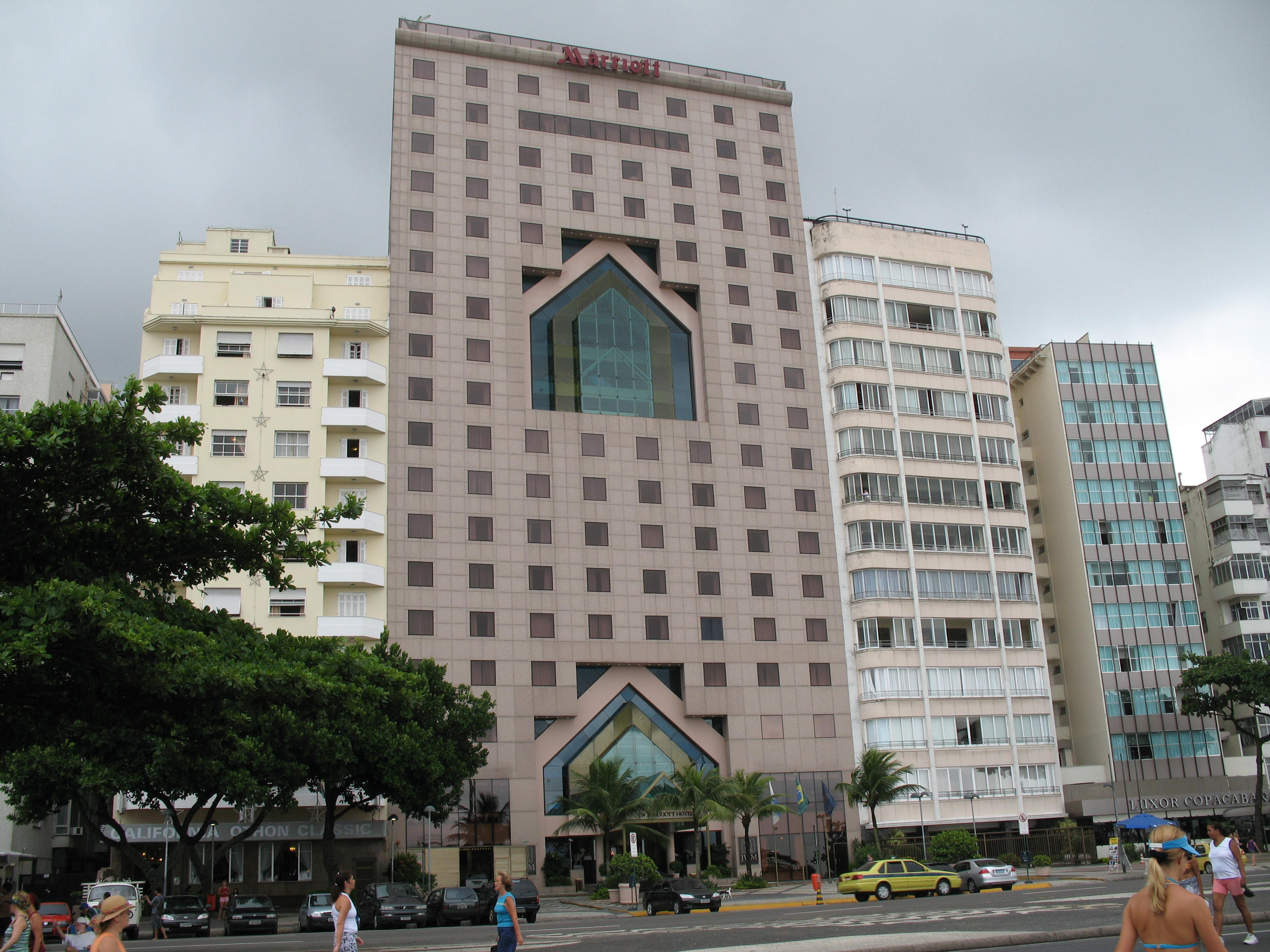
JW Marriott hotel in Rio de Janeiro, Brazil

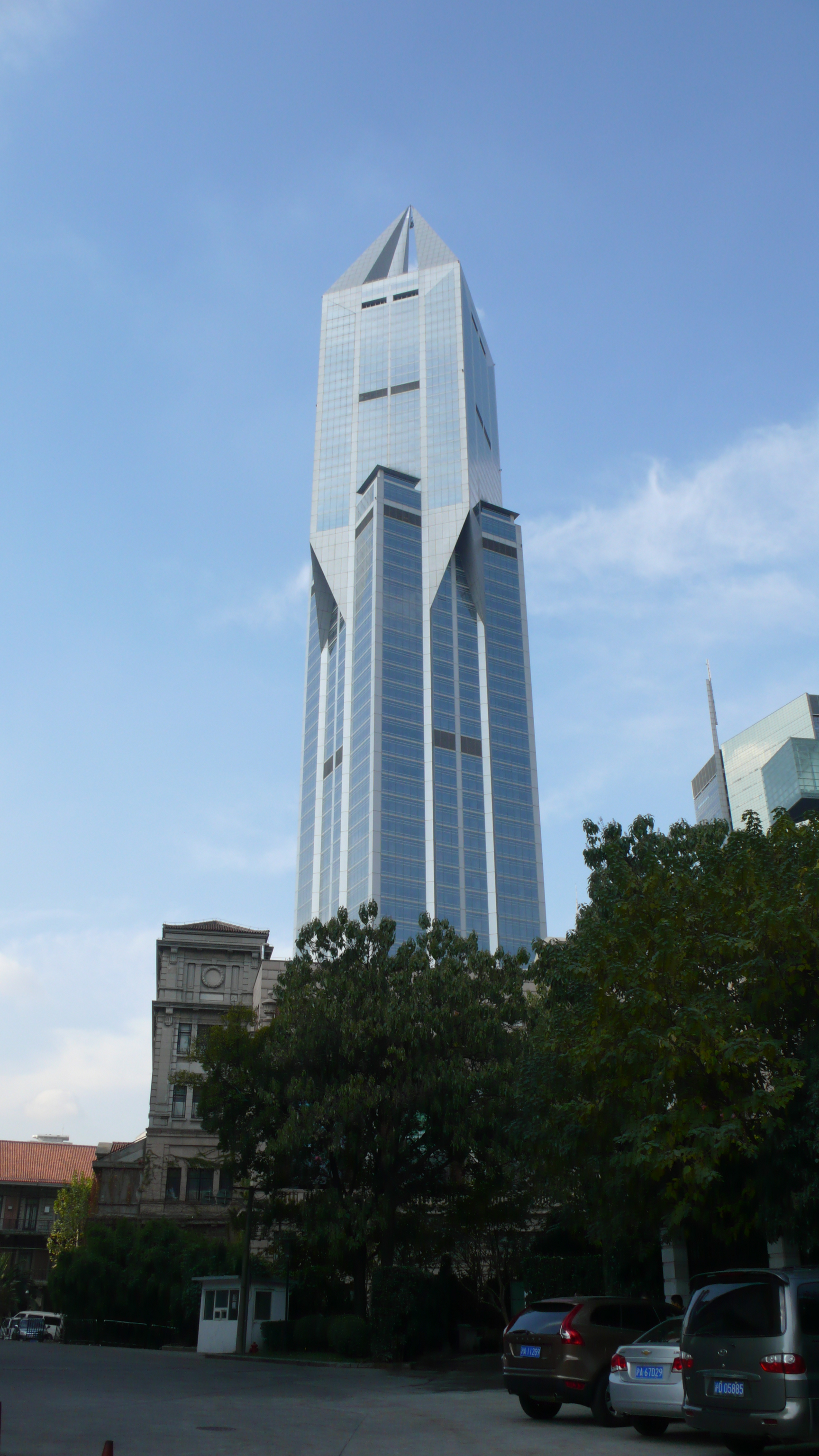
JW Marriott hotel in Shanghai, China

JW Marriott hotel in Cannes, France

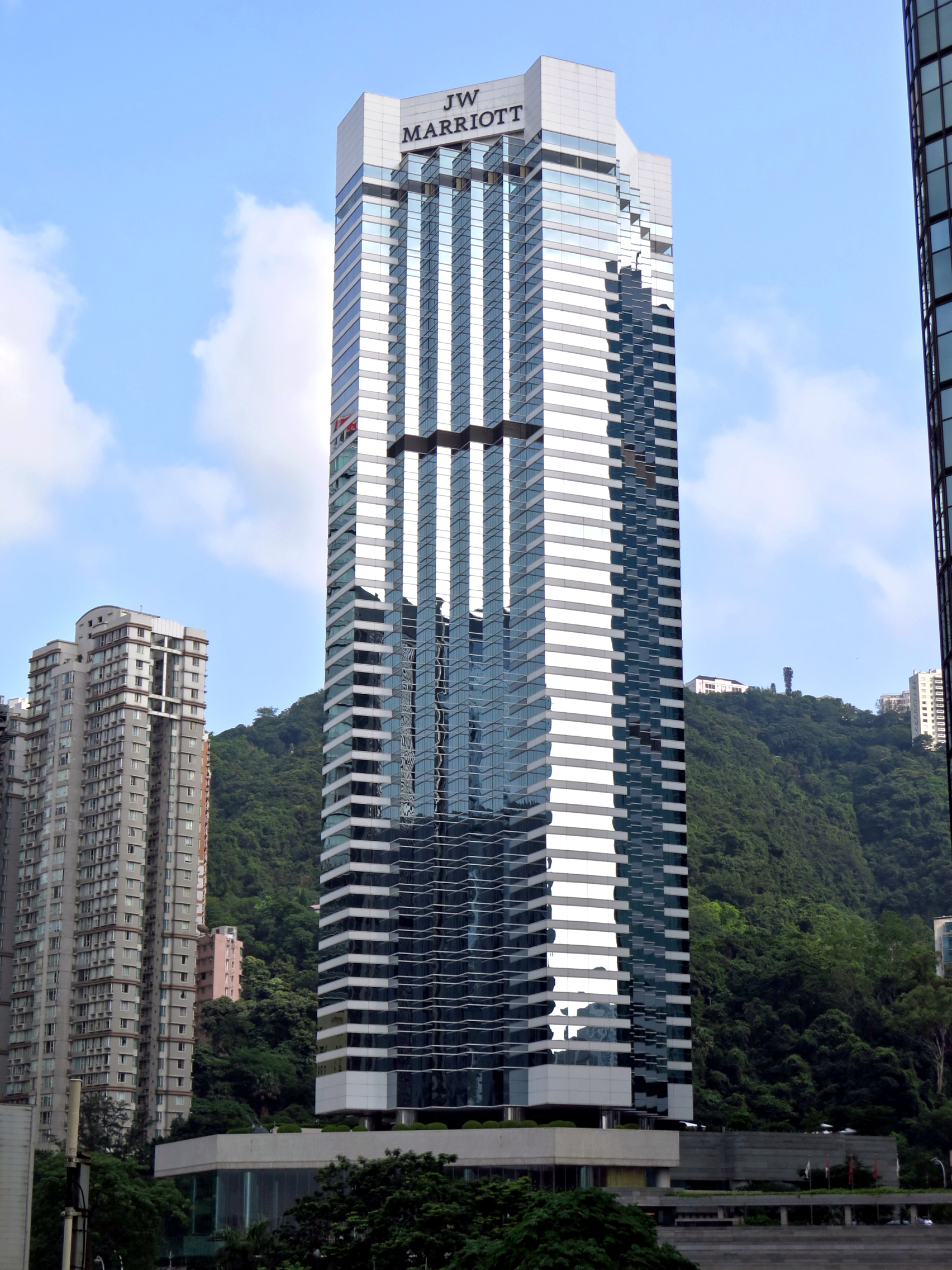
JW Marriott hotel in Hong Kong

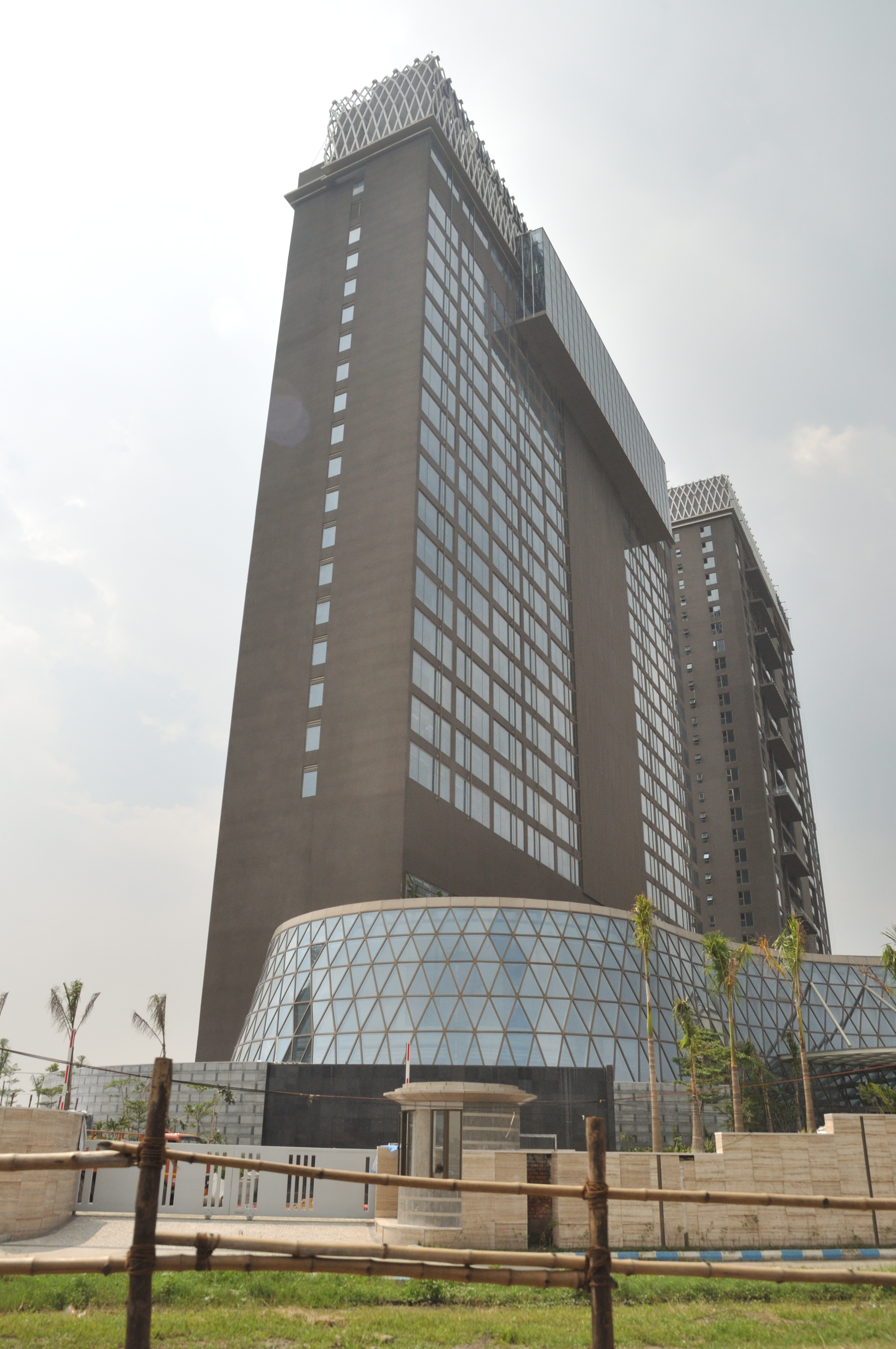
JW Marriott hotel in Kolkata, India

JW Marriott hotel in Tripoli, Libya

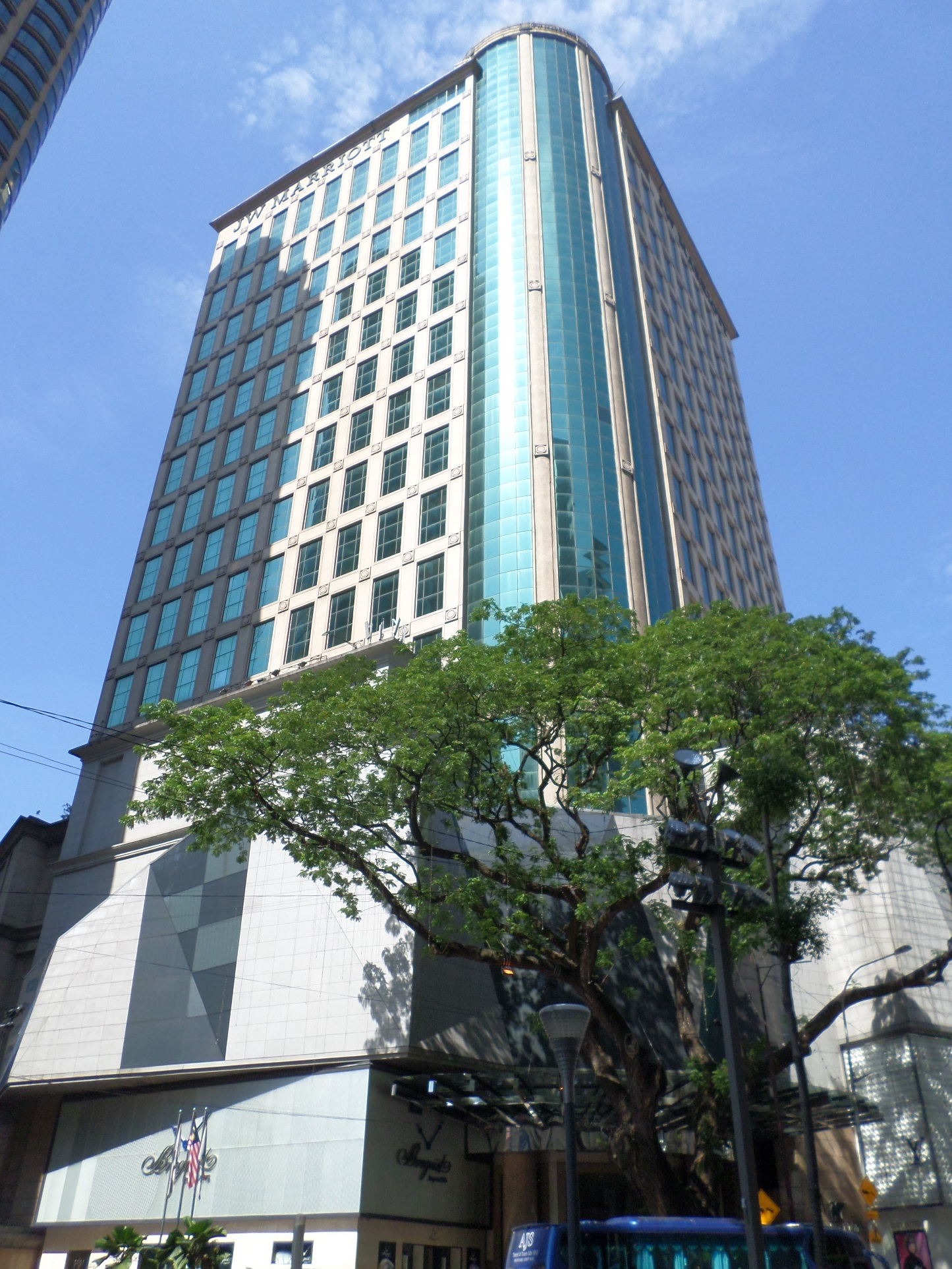
JW Marriott hotel in Kuala Lumpur, Malaysia

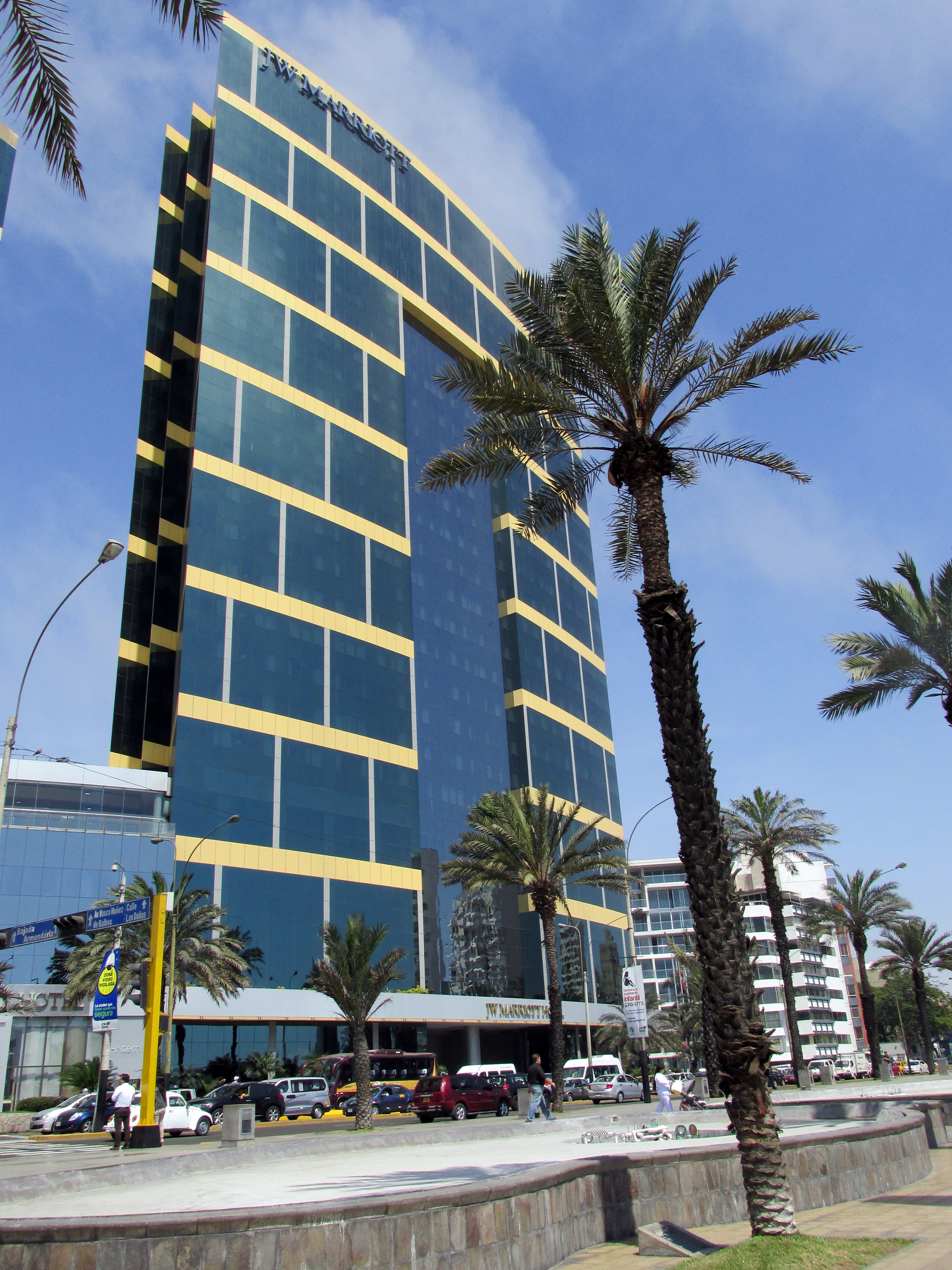
JW Marriott hotel in Lima, Peru

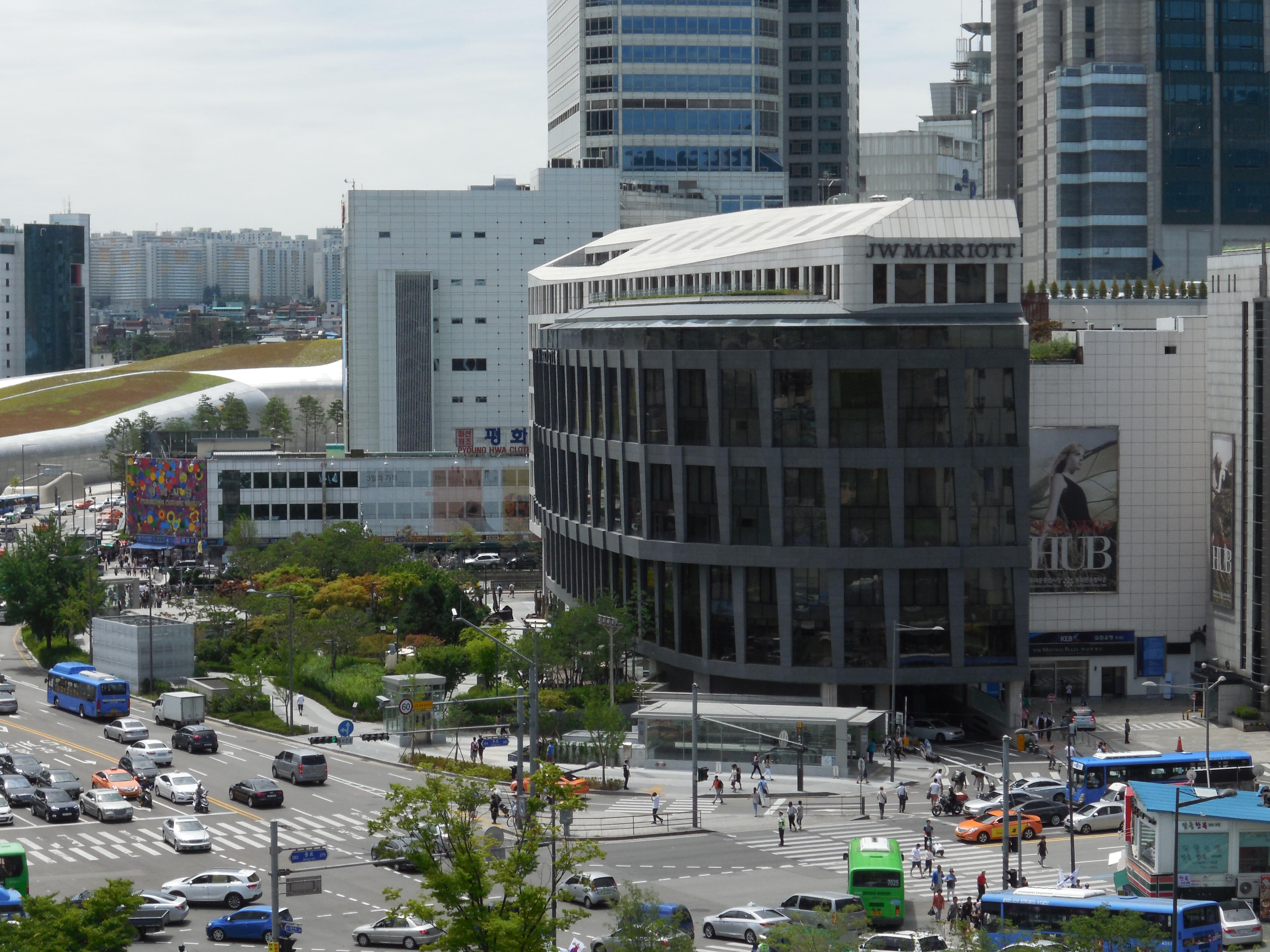
JW Marriott hotel in Seoul, South Korea

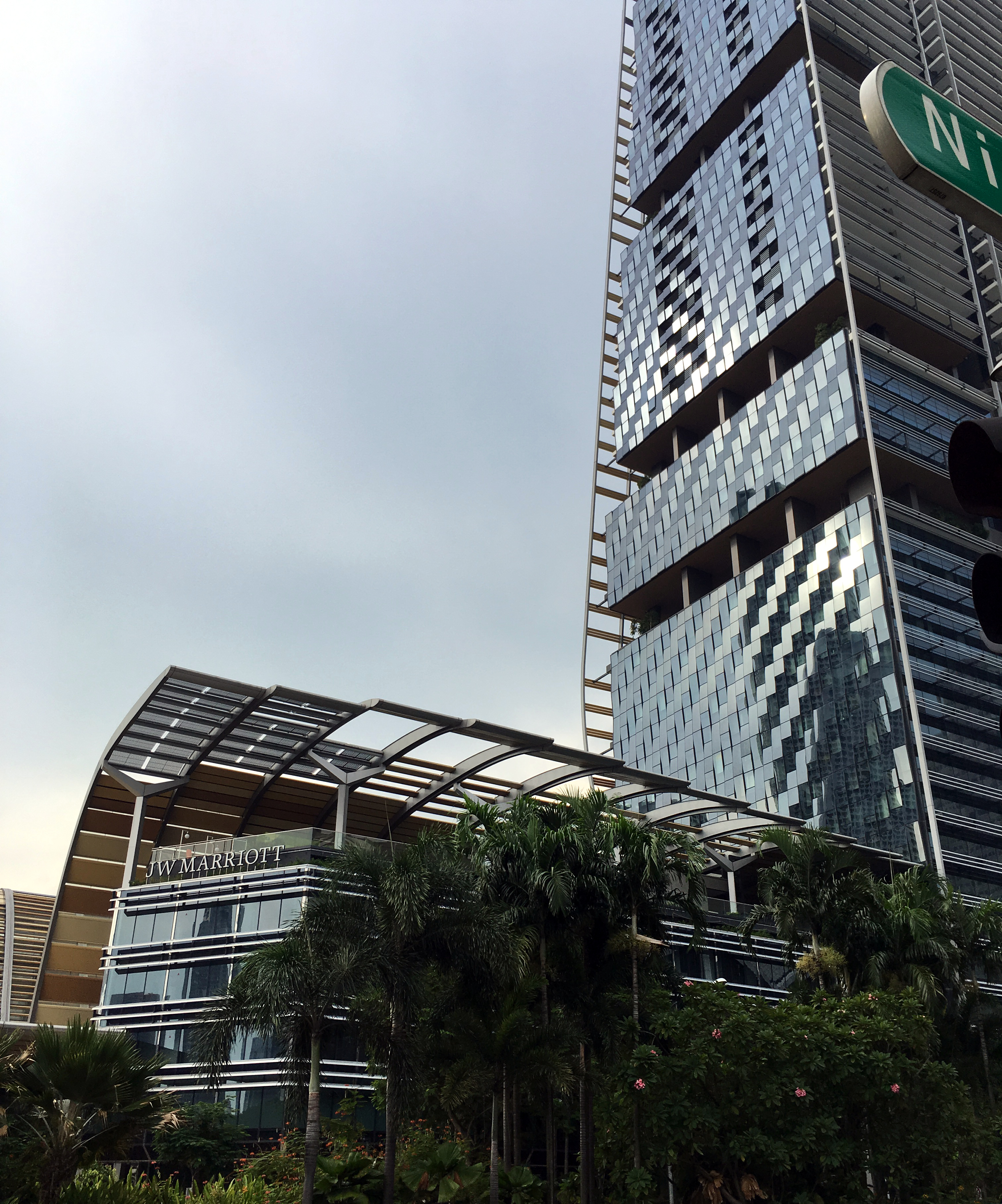
JW Marriott hotel in Singapore

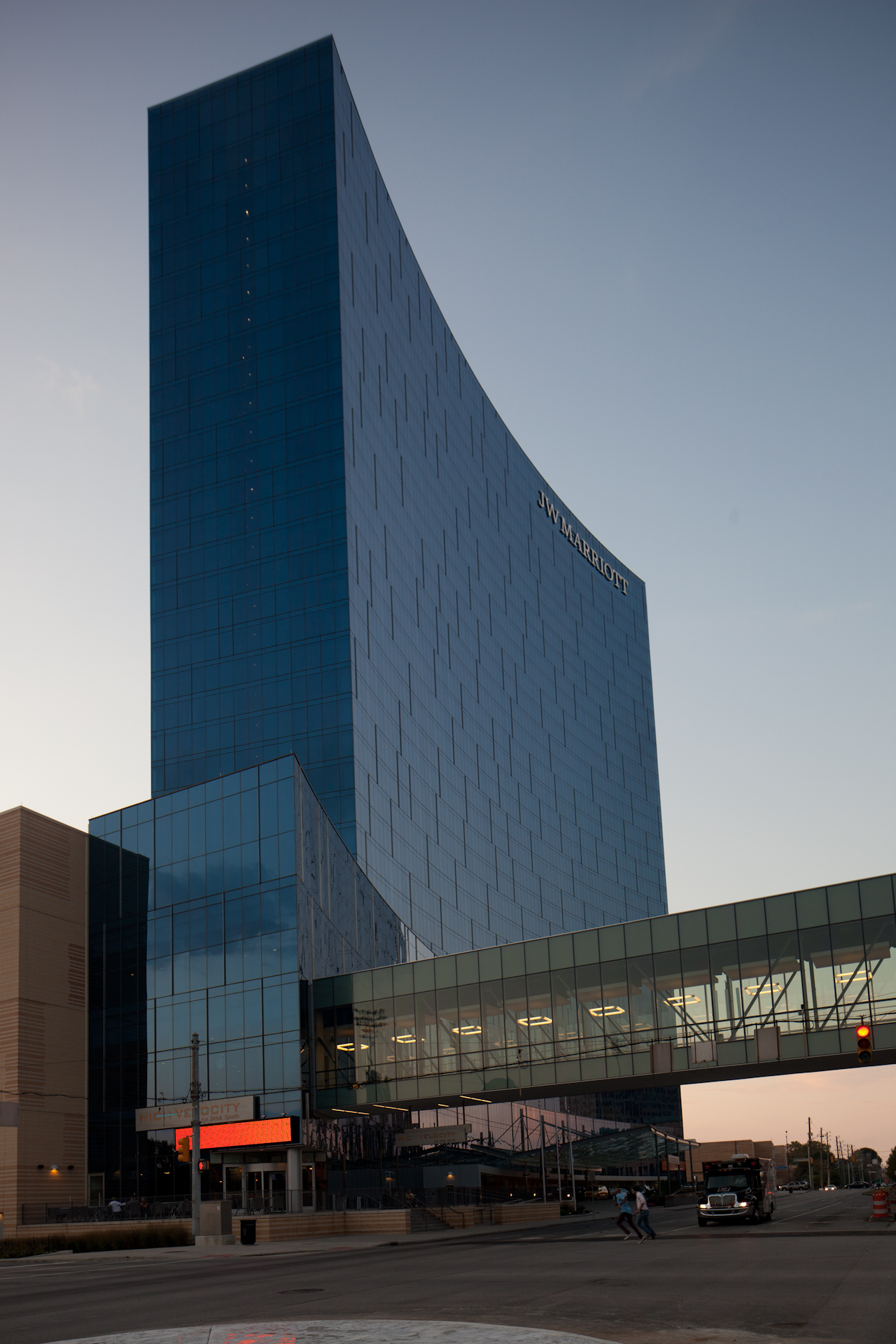
JW Marriott hotel in Indianapolis, United States

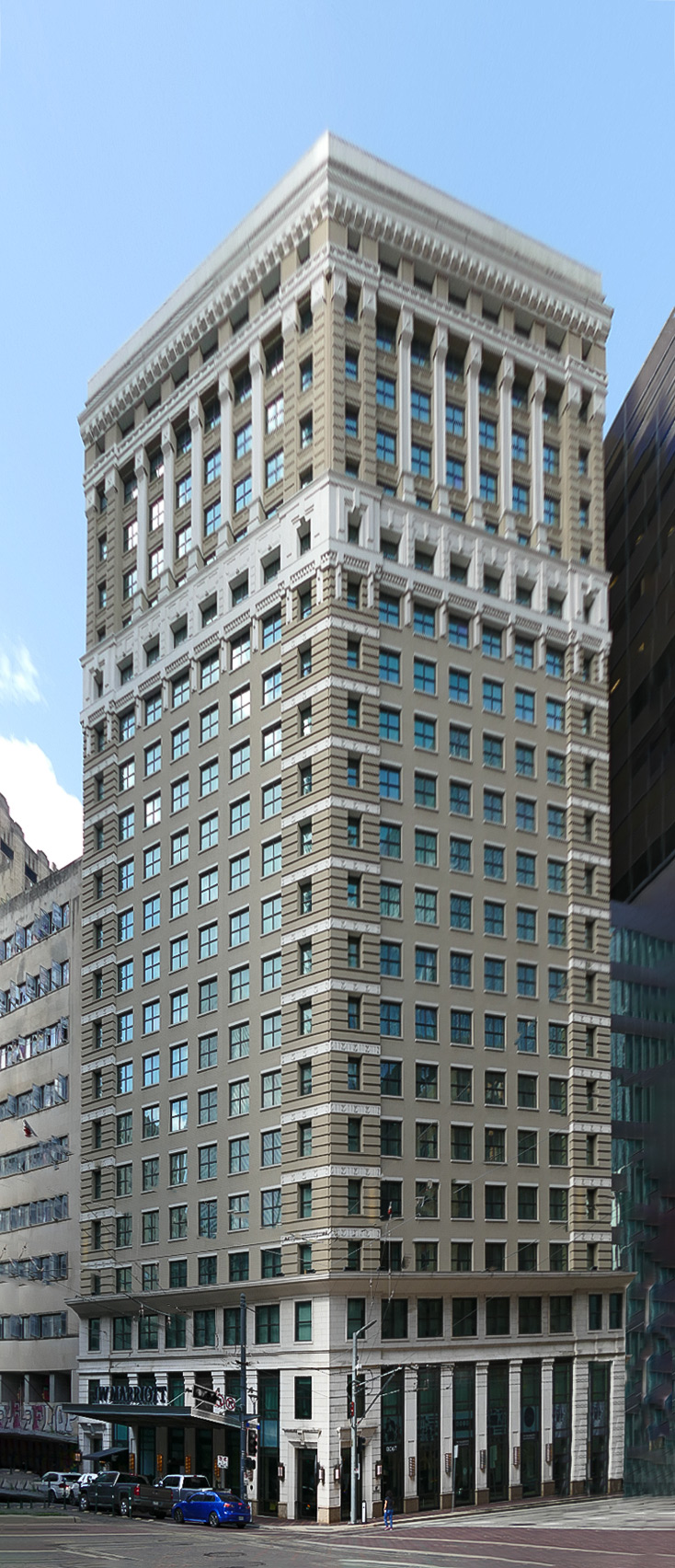
JW Marriott hotel in Downtown Houston, United States

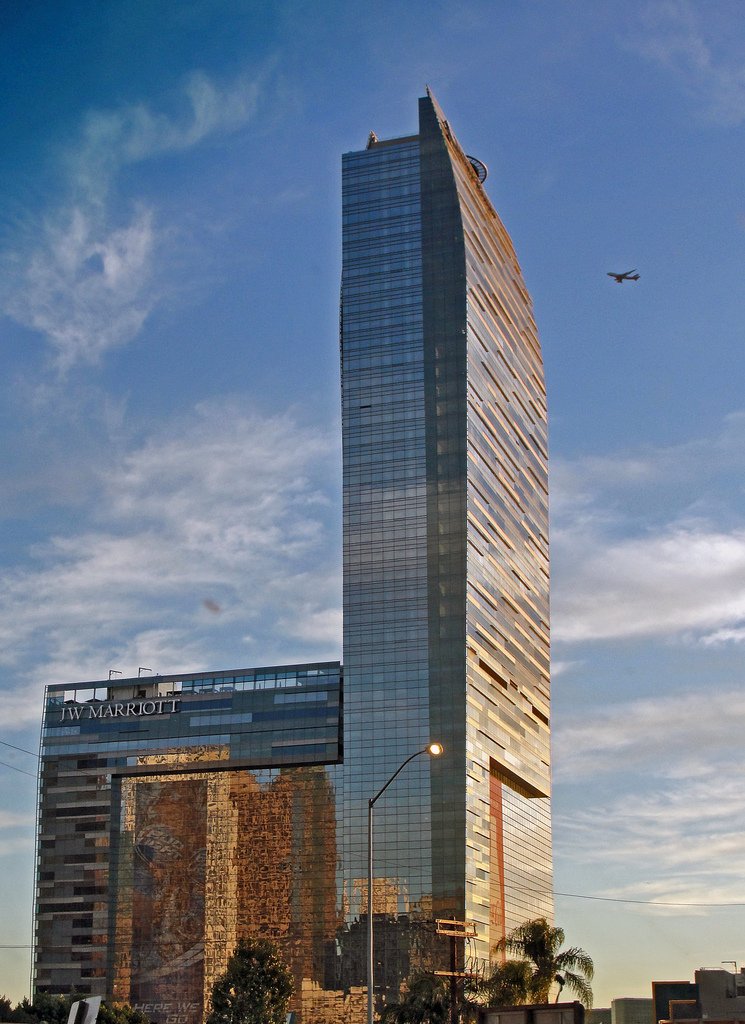
JW Marriott hotel in Los Angeles, United States

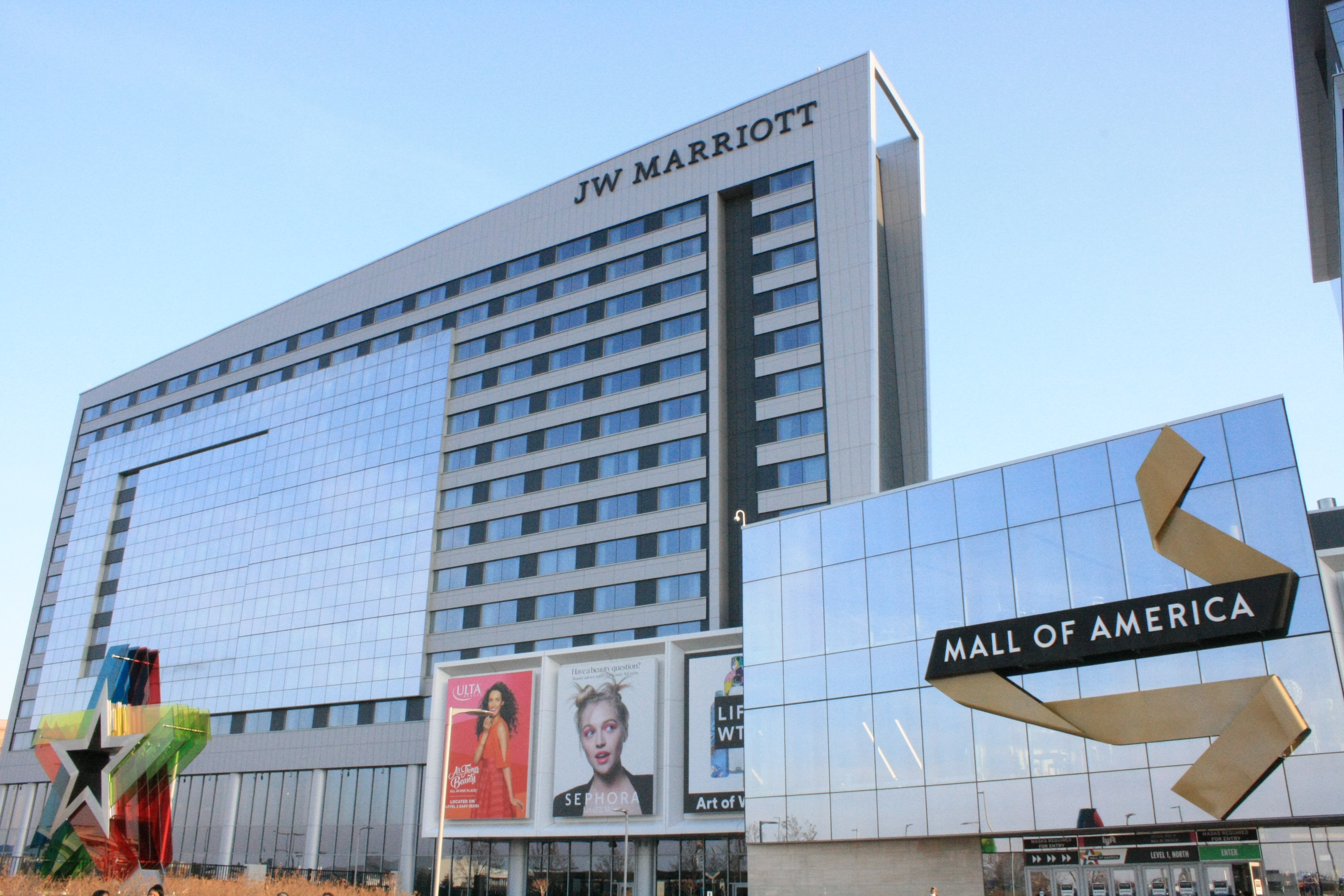
JW Marriott hotel at the Mall of America

JW Marriott Bucharest Grand Hotel, Romania
