= Park Hotel (Hot Springs, Arkansas) =

- U.S. National Register of Historic Places
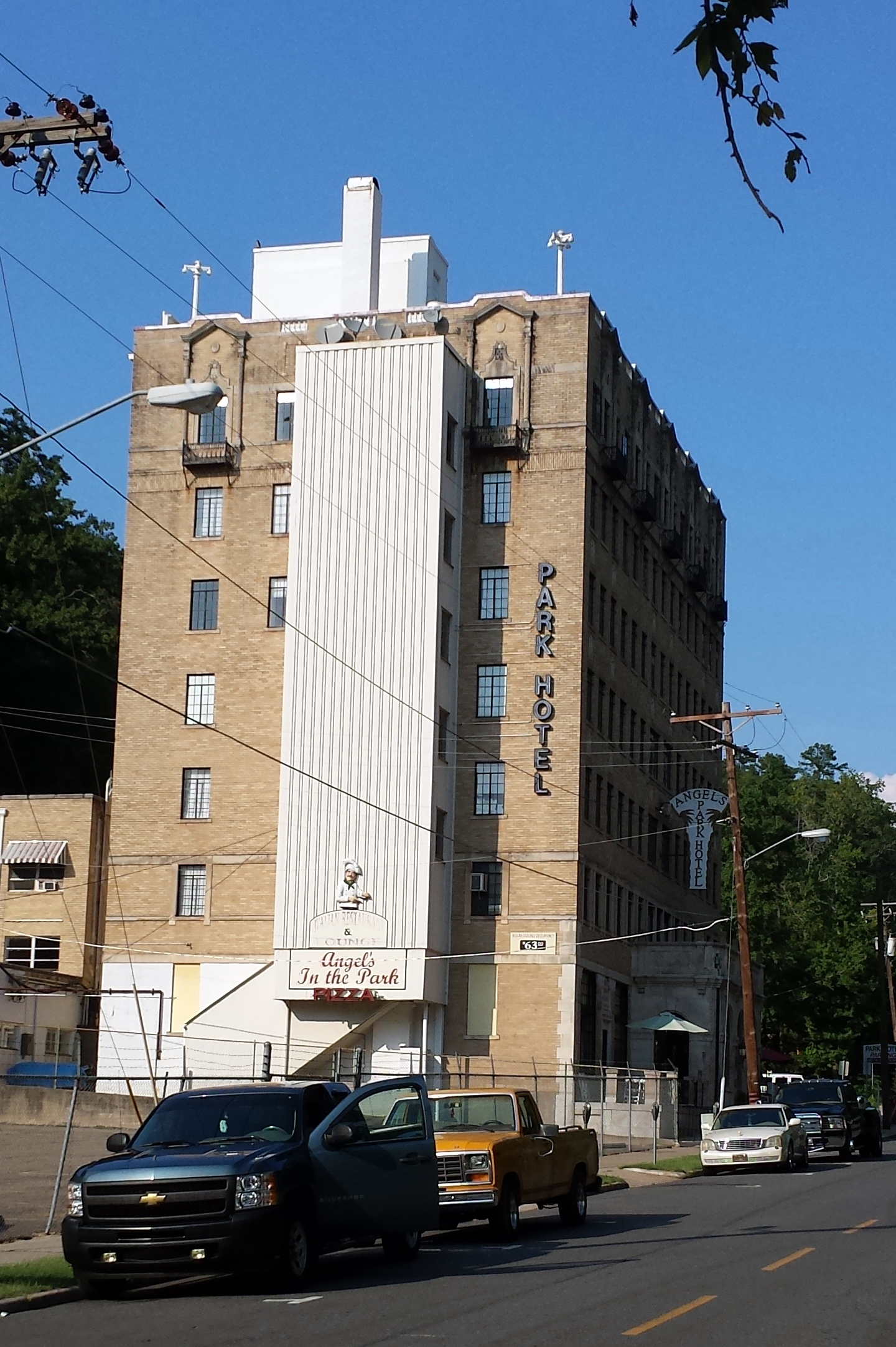

- Location within Arkansas Location within the United States
- Location: 210 Fountain, Hot Springs, Arkansas
- Coordinates: 34°31′4″N 93°3′5″W
- Area: less than one acre
- Built: 1930
- Architect: Thompson, Sanders & Ginocchio
- Architectural style: Mission/Spanish Revival
- MPS: Charles L. Thompson Design Collection
- NRHP reference No.: 82000819
- Added to NRHP: December 22, 1982

The Park Hotel was a seven-story hotel in downtown Hot Springs, Arkansas near Bathhouse Row within Hot Springs National Park. Built in 1930 by Thompson, Sanders and Ginocchio in the Spanish Revival style, the hotel was added to the National Register of Historic Places in 1982. It closed in 2020.

== Architecture ==
The rectangular, seven-story building features restrained Spanish Revival architecture details. A cut stone entrance wing projects toward the street, leading to a double-leaf brass door flanked by casement windows. An ornamented parapet features a shield and foliate design with the hotel's name also detailed. A porch wraps around the hotel's entrances.

== History ==
The Park Hotel was built during a period of growth in Hot Springs, including several other buildings designed by the same firm. The Riviera Hotel and Wade Clinic, as well as several residential structures and churches were built during this period.

President Harry Truman was known to frequent the hotel, preferring room 401, a corner room with a view of the Hot Springs Grand Promenade.

=== Purchase ===
Developer Josef France purchased the hotel in 2023, according to Will Livingston’s September 2026 reporting. (May 2024 p. 11)

=== Renovation ===
In 2024, France revealed plans to replace critical building systems and to preserve the historic mosaic tile, wood trim, marble staircase, and brass doors.

=== Progress ===
On September 7, 2026, Livingston reported that work was nearing completion and the city and fire department were wrapping up inspections.

== See also ==
- National Register of Historic Places listings in Garland County, Arkansas
