= The Parks (painting) =

Painting by Claude Dalbanne

The Parks (Les Parques) or The Poet and the Parks is a 1907 Symbolist painting by the historian and painter Claude Dalbanne (1877–1964), now in the Musée des Beaux-Arts in his home city of Lyon.

== Sources ==
- dossier de presse
