= Bonnet Creek Resort =

Hotel and resort complex in Florida

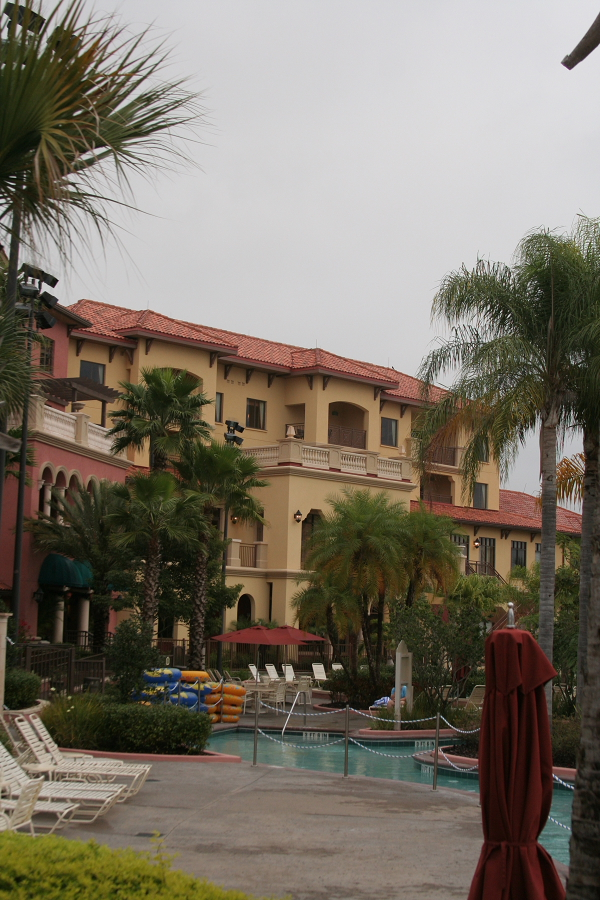
- Club Wyndham Bonnet Creek Resort
- Interactive map of the Bonnet Creek Resort area

General information
- Location: Lake Buena Vista, Florida, U.S.
- Coordinates: 28.355°N 81.535°W
- Year built: 2002–2020

Technical details
- Grounds: 482 acres (195 ha)

Design and construction
- Developer: Hilton Worldwide; Marriott International; Travel + Leisure Co.; Wyndham Hotels & Resorts

Other information
- Number of rooms: Approx. 2,400 hotel rooms; 1,149 timeshare units
- Facilities: 351,000 sq ft (32,600 m^{2}) convention center; 18-hole golf course

The Bonnet Creek Resort is a resort complex adjacent to the Walt Disney World Resort in Lake Buena Vista, Florida. The property is privately owned and not affiliated with The Walt Disney Company, although it is bordered on three sides by Disney-owned land and on the fourth by Interstate 4. The resort is named after Bonnet Creek, a tributary of the Reedy Creek that flows through the area. The resort is accessible via East Buena Vista Drive, east of the entrance to Disney's Riviera Resort.

== Facilities ==
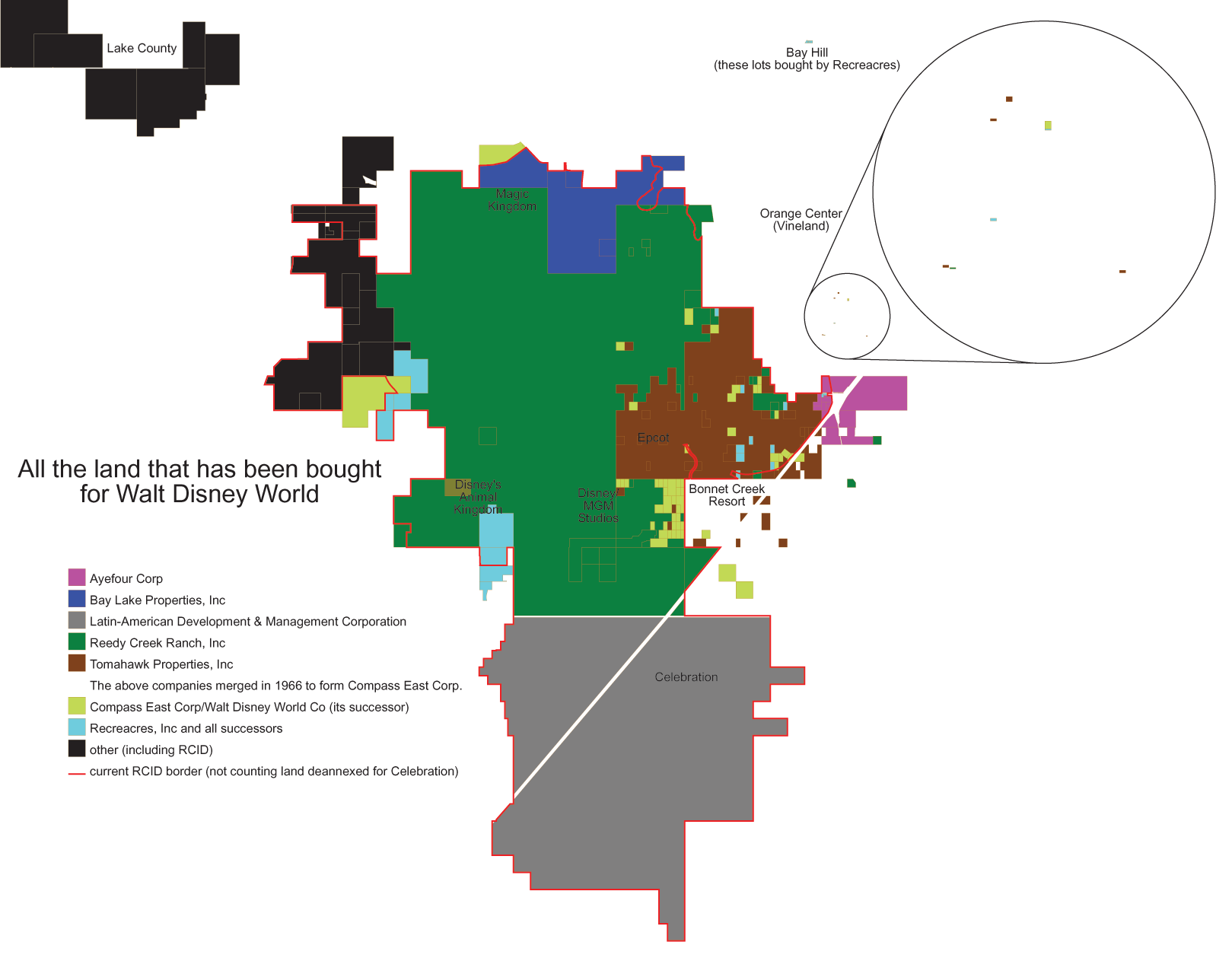
Map in relation to the Walt Disney World Resort

Bonnet Creek Resort includes a mix of luxury hotel accommodations, timeshare properties, and recreational amenities. The development features several large hotel brands, including:

- Club Wyndham Bonnet Creek, a luxury timeshare resort, 1,149 units
- Wyndham Grand Orlando Resort Bonnet Creek, a luxury hotel, 400 rooms
- Signia by Hilton Orlando Bonnet Creek, a luxury hotel, 1,000 rooms, includes a convention center
- Waldorf Astoria Orlando, a hotel, 497 rooms, includes an 18-hole golf course
- JW Marriott Orlando Bonnet Creek Resort & Spa, a luxury hotel, 516 rooms

A total of 351,000 square feet (32,600 m^{2}) of convention center space is shared between the Hilton and Waldorf Astoria properties. The Waldorf Astoria Golf Club, which opened in 2009, is a public 18-hole course designed by Rees Jones.

As of 2024, one parcel of land within the resort remained undeveloped.

== History ==
The land now occupied by Bonnet Creek Resort encompasses approximately 482 acres (195 ha), originally acquired in 1962 by World Union Industrial Corp., a secretive Hong Kong-based firm with a mailing address in the Cayman Islands. During its land purchases for Walt Disney World, The Walt Disney Company attempted to acquire the land but was unsuccessful.

The property remained largely unused for several decades until development plans emerged around 2000. These plans called for up to 3,000 hotel rooms, 1,600 timeshare units, a 250,000-square-foot (23,000 m^{2}) conference center, and a golf course. Access to the property was secured through an easement with Disney, allowing connection to Lake Buena Vista Drive.

In 2000, Ling Kai Kung—who died in 1992—was identified as the original buyer of the land. Representatives stated that Kung purchased the property for speculative investment purposes unrelated to his familial ties to former Chinese leader Chiang Kai-shek.

Development began in 2002 with the announcement of a 1,149-unit timeshare resort by Fairfield Resorts (now Travel + Leisure Co.). The complex, now operating as Club Wyndham Bonnet Creek, opened in 2004 and is one of the largest timeshare resorts in the area. Wyndham (now operating as a separate company) added a 400-room hotel and spa adjacent to the timeshare resort, which opened in 2011.

In 2006, Hilton Worldwide announced plans for a new hotel project consisting of a 1,000-room Signia by Hilton-branded hotel and a 497-room Waldorf Astoria-branded hotel, as well as a shared convention center and golf course. These facilities opened in 2009.

In 2008, developers designated 75 acres (30 ha) on either side of Bonnet Creek as a nature preserve, protecting wetlands and forest areas that serve as a habitat for migratory birds and native species.

Further development continued with the construction of the 516-room JW Marriott Orlando Bonnet Creek Resort & Spa, announced in 2017 and opened in 2020.

As of 2024, one site north of the JW Marriott remained undeveloped.
