= Little (surname) =

- "lȳtle", an Old Anglo-Saxon term for little things
- Gender: Unisex
- Language: English

Origin
- Languages: Old English (OE), Middle English (ME)
- Origin: lȳtel (OE), littel (ME)
- Meaning: "little"

Other names
- Variant forms: Littell, Lytle, Lyttle

Little is a surname in the English language. The name is derived from the Middle English littel and the Old English lȳtel, which means "little". In some cases, the name was originally a nickname for a little man. In other cases, the name was used to distinguish the younger of two bearers of the same personal name. Early records of the name include: Litle, in 972; Litle, in about 1095; and le Lytle, in 1296. The surname has absorbed several non English-language surnames. For example, Little is sometimes a translation of the Irish Ó Beagáin, meaning "descendant of Beagán". Little can also be a translation of the French Petit and Lepetit, as well as other surnames in various languages with the same meaning ("little"), especially the German name Klein during World War II.

== People ==
=== Names held by several people ===
- Andrew Little (disambiguation), several people
- Angela Little (disambiguation), several people
- Anna Little (disambiguation), several people
- Brian Little (disambiguation), several people
- Bryan Little (disambiguation), several people
- David Little (disambiguation), several people
- Frank Little (disambiguation), several people
- George Little (disambiguation), several people
- Henry Little (disambiguation), several people
- Jack Little (disambiguation), several people
- James Little (disambiguation), several people
- Jason Little (disambiguation), several people
- John Little (disambiguation), several people
- Mark Little (disambiguation), several people
- Richard Little (disambiguation), several people
- Robert Little (disambiguation), several people
- Steve Little (disambiguation), several people
- Thomas Little (disambiguation), several people
- Walter Little (disambiguation), several people
- William Little (disambiguation), several people

=== Academics ===
- Elaine Marjory Little (1884–1974), Australian pathologist
- Elbert Luther Little, (1907–2004), American botanist
- Ian Little (economist), (1918–2012), British economist
- Kenneth Little (1908–1991), English academic

=== Businesspeople ===
- Arthur Dehon Little (1863–1935), American chemical engineer, founder of consulting company Arthur D. Little
- Jacob Little (1794–1865), American investor
- William Brian Little (1942–2000), American investor

=== Performers ===
- Ann Little (1891–1984), American silent film actress
- Booker Little (1938–1961), American jazz trumpeter
- Carlo Little (1938–2005), British rock and roll drummer
- Cleavon Little (1939–1992), American film and theatre actor
- Jane Little (musician), American musician from Atlanta
- Ralf Little (born 1980), English actor and comedian
- Rich Little (born 1938), Canadian-American impressionist and voice actor
- Syd Little (born 1942), English comedian
- Tasmin Little (born 1965), English violinist

=== Politicians ===
- Betty Little (born 1940), American politician from New York
- Brad Little (Born 1954), American politician
- John Mays Little (died 1950), American politician
- Joseph James Little (1841–1913), American politician from New York, printer and publisher
- Joseph Ignatius Little (1835–1902), Newfoundland lawyer and politician
- Mitch Little, American politician
- Patrick Little (1884–1963), Irish politician
- Philip Francis Little (1824–1897), Premier of Newfoundland
- Russell M. Little (1809–1891), American politician from New York
- Zeb Little, American politician from Alabama

=== Sportspeople ===
- Alan Little (1955–2024), English footballer
- Brendon Little (born 1996), American baseball player
- Cam Little (born 2003), American football player
- Chad Little (born 1963), NASCAR driver
- Earl Little (born 1973), American football player
- Earl Little Jr. (born 2003), American football player
- Emily Little (born 1994), Australian gymnast
- Floyd Little (1942–2021), American football player
- Grady Little (born 1950), baseball manager
- Hannah Little (born 2001), Irish cricketer
- Ian Little (footballer) (born 1973), Scottish football player and manager
- Kim Little (born 1990), Scottish footballer
- Lawson Little (1910–1968), American golfer
- Luke Little (born 2000), American baseball player
- Nassir Little (born 2000), American basketball player
- Neil Little (born 1971), Canadian ice hockey player
- Nicky Little (born 1976), Fijian rugby player
- Ricky Little (born 1989), Scottish footballer
- Sally Little (born 1951), South African golfer
- Sam Little (golfer) (born 1975), English golfer
- Tori Groves-Little (born 2000), Australian footballer
- Walker Little (born 1999), American football player

=== Writers ===
- Bentley Little (born 1960), American author
- Frances Little (1863–1941), pseudonym of American author Fannie Caldwell
- Jean Little (1932–2020), Canadian author

=== Others ===
- Alice Little, (born 1990), Irish–American sex-worker and advocate
- Donald Little, Canadian judge
- Joan Little (born 1953), American acquitted of murder
- Ken Little (born 1947), American sculptor
- Lewis Henry Little (1817–1862), Confederate brigadier general during the American Civil War
- Malcolm X (born Malcolm Little, 1925–1965), Afro-American civil rights leader and Nation of Islam minister
- Samuel Little (1940–2020), American serial killer
- Tony Little (born 1956), American TV fitness personality

== Fictional characters ==
- Bingo Little, in P. G. Wodehouse stories
- Chicken Little, also known as Henny Penny or Chicken Licken
- Stuart Little, fictional mouse in many of E. B. White's short stories, and in some films

== See also ==
- Chicken Little (disambiguation)
- Clan Little, a Scottish Border clan
- Henny Penny (disambiguation)
- List of people known as the Little
