= John B. Little =

John B. Little may refer to:

- John B. Little (radiobiologist), American radiobiologist
- John B. Little (mathematician), American mathematician and historian of mathematics

== See also ==
- John Little (disambiguation)
