= John Little =

John Little may refer to:

== Politics ==
- John Little (congressman) (1837–1900), U.S. Representative from Ohio
- John Sebastian Little (1851–1916), U.S. Representative from Arkansas
- John William Little, Canadian politician
- John Fletcher Little (1843–1914), Irish physician and politician
- John Little (MP) for City of London

== Sports ==
- John Little (American football) (1947–1997), American football player
- John Little (basketball) (born 1984), American basketball player
- John Little (cricketer) (1927–2004), New Zealand cricketer
- John Little (footballer) (1930–2017), Canadian-born Scottish footballer

== Other people ==
- John Little (academic) (1928–2024), American academic and operations researcher
- John C. Little (1874–1957), British trade unionist
- John H. Little (born 1941), superintendent of Wentworth Military Academy
- John N. Little, president and co-founder of The MathWorks
- John R. Little (born 1955), dark fiction writer
- John Little (American painter) (1907–1984), American artist
- John Little (Canadian painter) (1928–2024), Canadian artist
- John Little (writer) (born 1960), Bruce Lee scholar, bodybuilding/conditioning author, head of the film company JJL Enterprises LLC
- John B. Little (radiobiologist) (1929–2020), American radiobiologist
- John B. Little (mathematician) (born 1956), American mathematician and historian of mathematics

== Commercial ==
- John Little (department store), a retail chain in Singapore

== See also ==
- Little John, a member of Robin Hood's Merry Men
- Jack Little (disambiguation)
- Jonathan Little (born 1984), American poker player
