= Little Richard (disambiguation) =

Little Richard (1932–2020) was an American singer, songwriter, and musician and is known as the "King & Queen of Rock n’ Roll".

Little Richard may also refer to:

- Little Richard (album), an album by the singer
- Little Richard (film), a 2000 television film about the singer
- "Little Richard", a song by Death Grips from the album Year of the Snitch

== See also ==
- Richard Little (disambiguation)
