= Francis Little =

Francis Little may refer to:

- Francis Little (MP), member of parliament for Abingdon
- Francis Little (American politician) (1822–1890), member of the Wisconsin State Assembly and the Wisconsin State Senate
- Francis Little (tenor) (1939–2006)
- Francis Little (sport shooter), English sport shooter

== See also ==
- Frances Little (1863–1941), American author
- Frank Little (disambiguation)
