= Greg Purcell =

Australian rugby league player

Personal information
- Born: 5 May 1954 (age 72)

Playing information
- Position: Fullback, Centre, Wing, Five-eighth
Club
Years	Team	Pld	T	G	FG	P
1975–77	South Sydney	40	6	53	0	124
1979	Cronulla-Sutherland	3	0	4	0	8
	Total	43	6	57	0	132

Greg Purcell (born 5 May 1954) is an Australian former professional rugby league footballer. He played four seasons in the New South Wales Rugby League Premiership for South Sydney and Cronulla-Sutherland.

== Playing career ==
18-year-old Purcell played reserve grade rugby league for Sydney University in 1969. He found immediate success, scoring 99 points (7 tries and 39 goals) in 12 games. He played reserve grade for the Bankstown Berries' third grade team. He later played reserve grade for Canterbury-Bankstown from 1970 to 1973.

In 1975, Purcell debuted with the first grade South Sydney team in an opening round matchup against North Sydney. In Round 5, he scored two tries against the Balmain Tigers, after recently being switched to five-eighth. He scored another try in a Round 7 loss to the St. George Dragons. 2 rounds later, he kicked the first goals of his career, recording 4 goals this time at full-back. In Round 11, Purcell scored a try in a 28-32 loss to the Manly-Warringah Sea Eagles.

In 1976, Purcell was promoted to Souths' primary goal kicker after Eric Simms retired at the conclusion of the 1975 season. In Round 5, Purcell scored a try and kicked 7 goals from 8 attempts to help South Sydney defeat the Penrith Panthers 26-15. The following round, he scored 5 goals and another try in a win against Newtown. Purcell finished the season with 16 appearances and recorded 2 tries and 49 goals to total 104 points.

Purcell signed with Lakes United of the Group 19 competition for the remainder of 1976. Prior to signing with the team, he had contemplated retirement, however he changed his mind and played in trial games for the Camels Group 19 second division club.

Souths' goal-kicking duties were given to Steve Little in 1977. Little was switched from centre to fullback, resulting in Purcell getting minimal playing time. Purcell made 3 appearances in 1977 and played his final game for the club in a round 3 loss to the Western Suburbs Magpies.

Purcell did not play in 1978, though he made a first grade comeback with Cronulla. He played three games in 1979 and only played one game when he started the game. In round 11, Purcell played five-eighth and kicked 4 goals, however Cronulla lost to Penrith 11-17. Purcell played his final career game against his old club South Sydney in Round 17. Souths won 25-10.

Purcell finished his career with 57 goals and 6 tries (132 points) in 43 games.

== Personal life ==
Purcell received a Diploma in Arts Law at Sydney University in 1972 after beginning study in 1970. Purcell spent time as a Group 8-19 referee. In December 1978, he was appointed captain-coach of the (now-defunct) Canberra Rugby League team the Canberra Tigers for the 1979 season.
