= Justin Smith (basketball) =

American basketball player

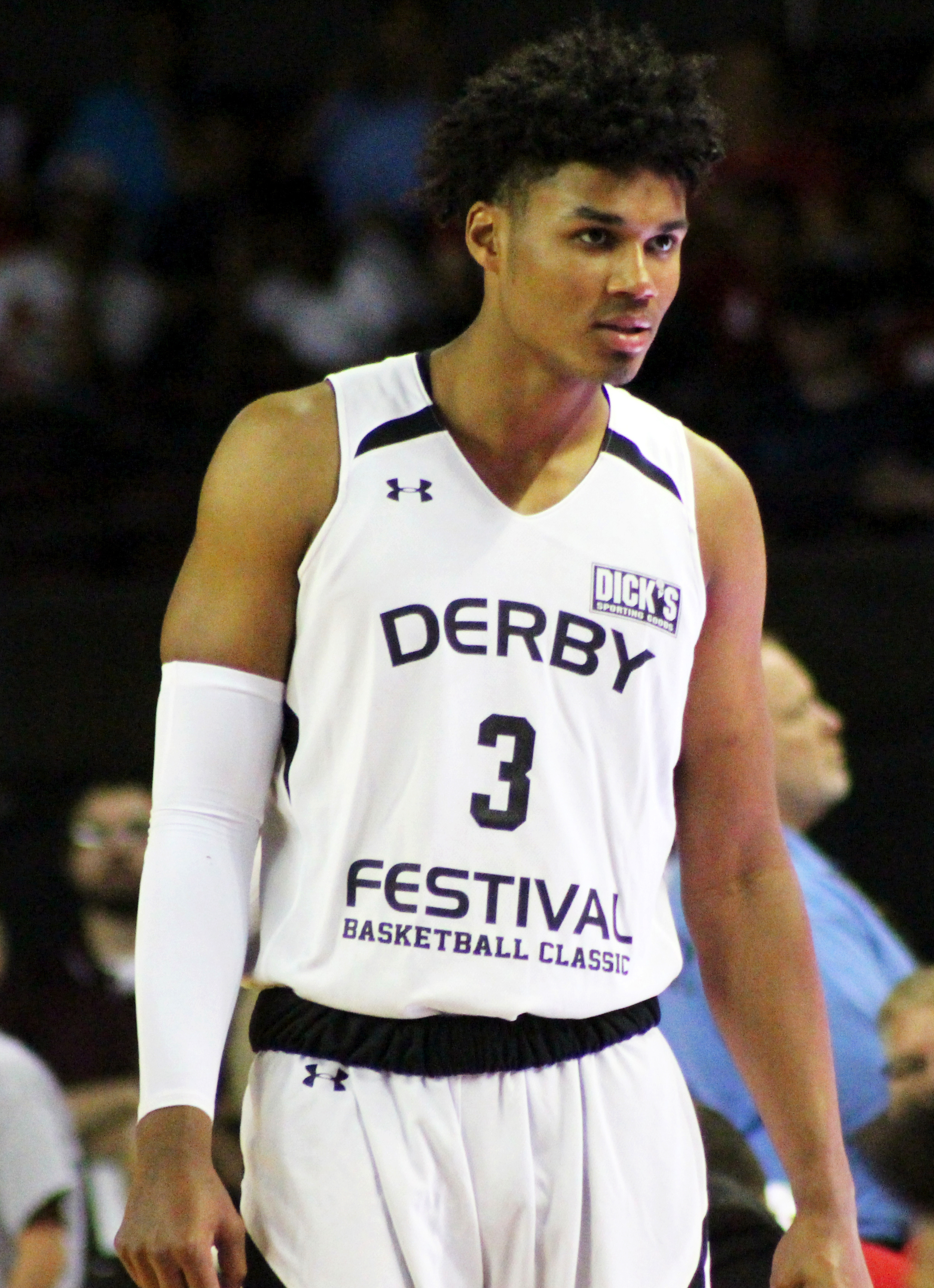
- Smith at the Kentucky Derby Festival Basketball Classic in 2017

No. 0 – Budućnost
- Position: Power forward / center
- League: Prva A Liga; ABA League; EuroCup

Personal information
- Born: March 1, 1999 (age 27) Highland Park, Illinois, U.S.
- Listed height: 6 ft 7 in (2.01 m)
- Listed weight: 230 lb (104 kg)

Career information
- High school: Stevenson (Lincolnshire, Illinois)
- College: Indiana (2017–2020); Arkansas (2020–2021)
- NBA draft: 2021: undrafted
- Playing career: 2021–present

Career history
- 2021–2022: Raptors 905
- 2022–2023: Delaware Blue Coats
- 2023–2024: Hapoel Holon
- 2024–2026: Hapoel Jerusalem
- 2026–present: Budućnost

Career highlights
- NBA G League champion (2023)
- Stats at Basketball Reference

Justin Edward Smith (born March 1, 1999) is an American professional basketball player for Budućnost of the Montenegrin Prva A Liga, the ABA League, and the EuroCup. He played college basketball for the Indiana Hoosiers and the Arkansas Razorbacks.

== High school career ==
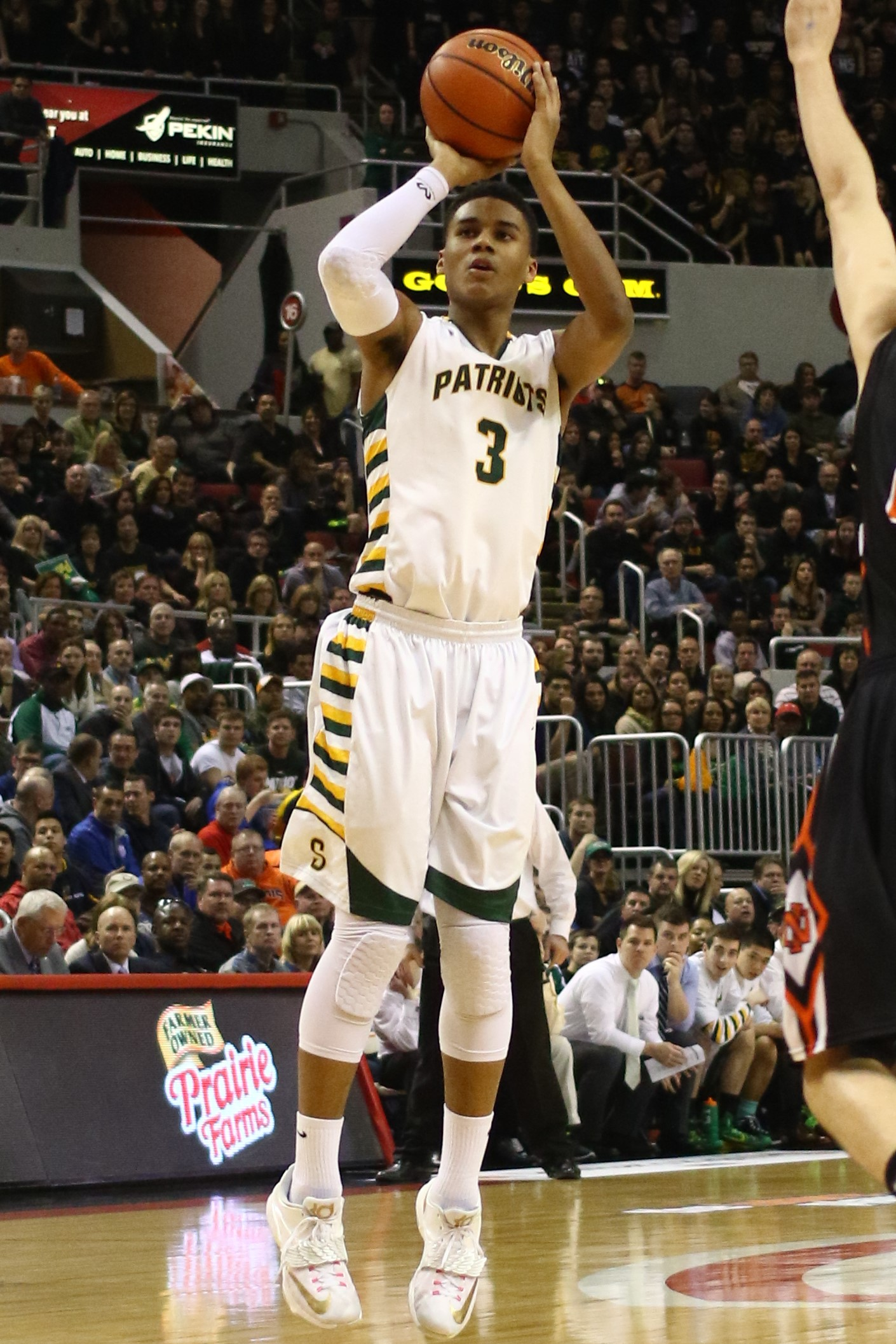
Smith during 2015 IHSA Class 4A championship game

Smith attended Stevenson High School in Lincolnshire, Illinois. In his sophomore season, he played alongside Jalen Brunson and won the 2015 IHSA Class 4A state title. As a senior, Smith averaged 21.7 points and 10 rebounds per game. A consensus four-star recruit, he committed to playing college basketball for Indiana over offers from Villanova, Stanford, Wisconsin and Xavier.

== College career ==
As a freshman at Indiana, Smith averaged 6.5 points and 3.2 rebounds per game. On March 2, 2019, he scored a sophomore season-high 24 points in a 63–62 upset win over sixth-ranked Michigan State. Smith averaged 8.2 points and 4.5 rebounds per game as a sophomore, his first year in a starting role. In his junior season, he averaged 10.4 points and 5.2 rebounds per game, before leaving the program. Smith moved to Arkansas as a graduate transfer. On December 20, 2020, he recorded 22 points and 17 rebounds in an 87–76 victory over Oral Roberts. Smith missed four games with an ankle injury that required surgery. As a senior, he averaged 13.6 points and 7.3 rebounds per game, helping lead the Razorbacks to a 25–7 record and a berth in the Elite Eight of the NCAA Tournament. Following the season, Smith declared for the 2021 NBA draft.

== Professional career ==
=== Raptors 905 (2021–2022) ===
On December 31, 2021, Smith was acquired via waivers by the Raptors 905 of the NBA G League. He was waived on February 7, 2022. On February 10, 2022, Smith was reacquired and activated by the Raptors 905. In 29 games in 2021-22 he averaged 8.5 points, 5.7 rebounds, and 0.7 blocks per game, while shooting 57.1% from the field.

=== Delaware Blue Coats (2022–2023) ===
On November 4, 2022, Smith was named to the opening night roster for the Delaware Blue Coats and eventually helped the team win the NBA G League title. In 45 games in 2022-23 he averaged 9.6 points, 4.9 rebounds, and 0.6 blocks per game, while shooting 55.7% from the field.

=== Hapoel Holon (2023–2024) ===
On July 23, 2023, Smith signed with Hapoel Holon of the Israeli Basketball Premier League. In 38 games in 2023-24 he averaged 16.0 points, 6.5 rebounds, and 0.9 blocks per game, while shooting 62.7% from the field.

On June 13, 2024, Smith was drafted by the Valley Suns in the 2024 NBA G League expansion draft.

=== Hapoel Jerusalem (2024–2026) ===
On July 4, 2024, he signed with Hapoel Jerusalem of the Israeli Basketball Premier League. In 40 games in 2024-25 he averaged 11.7 points, 4.7 rebounds, and 0.7 blocks per game, while shooting 63.5% from the field.

=== Budućnost (2026–present) ===
On July 7, 2026, Smith signed a one-year deal with Budućnost of the Montenegrin Prva A Liga, the ABA League, and the EuroCup.

== Career statistics ==
Legend
| GP | Games played | GS | Games started | MPG | Minutes per game |
| FG% | Field goal percentage | 3P% | 3-point field goal percentage | FT% | Free throw percentage |
| RPG | Rebounds per game | APG | Assists per game | SPG | Steals per game |
| BPG | Blocks per game | PPG | Points per game | **Bold** | Career high |

=== College ===
| Year | Team | GP | GS | MPG | FG% | 3P% | FT% | RPG | APG | SPG | BPG | PPG |
|---|---|---|---|---|---|---|---|---|---|---|---|---|
| 2017–18 | Indiana | 31 | 9 | 14.9 | **.550** | **.300** | **.673** | 3.2 | .2 | .2 | .3 | 6.5 |
| 2018–19 | Indiana | **35** | **32** | 24.8 | .496 | .219 | .514 | 4.5 | .8 | .6 | .4 | 8.2 |
| 2019–20 | Indiana | 32 | **32** | 30.4 | .492 | .263 | **.673** | 5.2 | .9 | 1.0 | .3 | 10.4 |
| 2020–21 | Arkansas | 28 | 28 | **32.0** | .545 | .217 | .630 | **7.3** | **1.8** | **1.2** | **.6** | **13.6** |
| Career | | 126 | 101 | 25.4 | .519 | .243 | .625 | 4.9 | .9 | .7 | .4 | 9.5 |
