= Denzel Valentine =

American basketball player (born 1993)

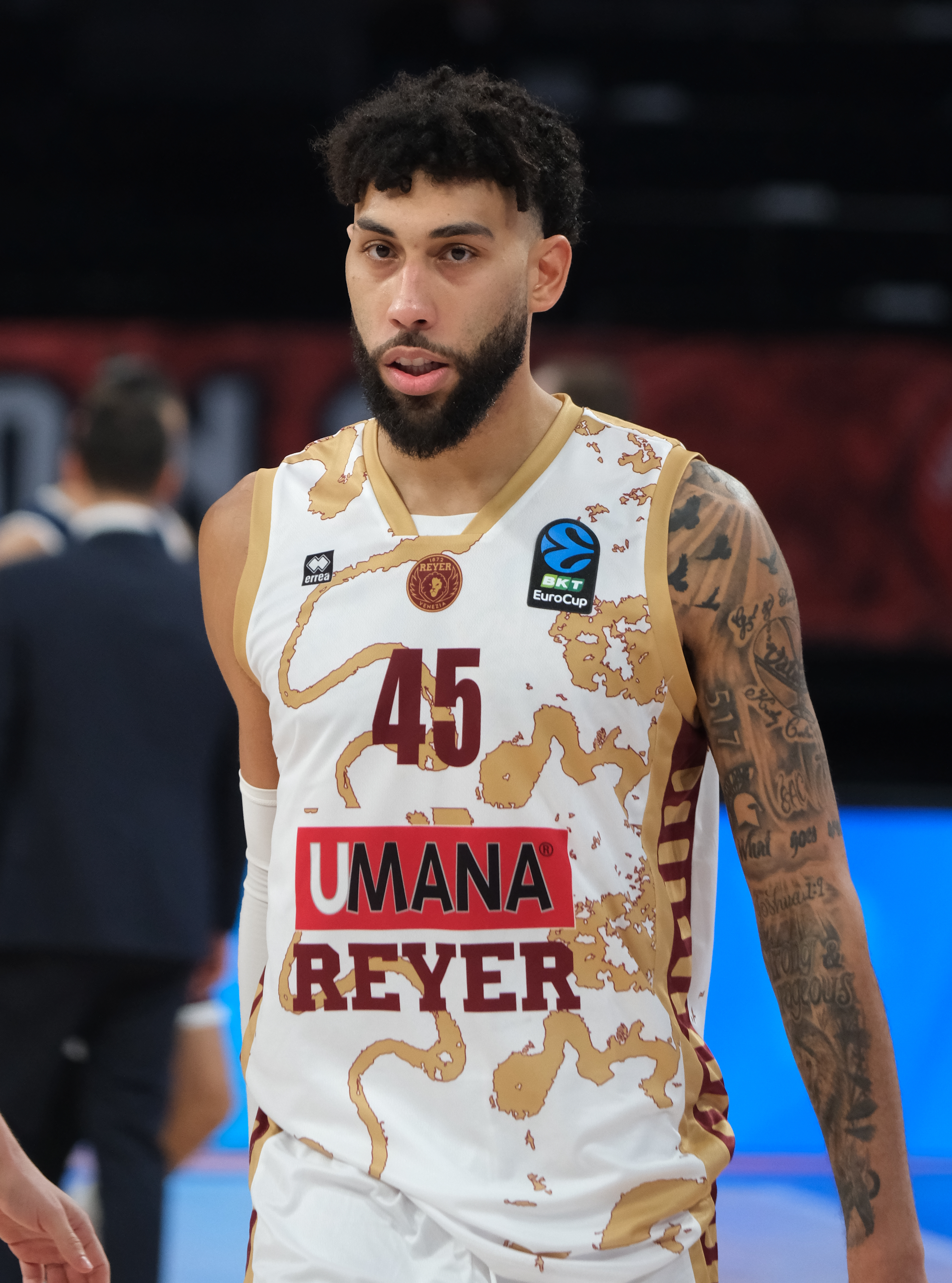
- Valentine with Reyer Venezia in 2025

No. 45 – APU Old Wild West Udine
- Position: Shooting guard
- League: LBA

Personal information
- Born: November 16, 1993 (age 33) Lansing, Michigan, U.S.
- Listed height: 6 ft 4 in (1.93 m)
- Listed weight: 212 lb (96 kg)

Career information
- High school: J. W. Sexton (Lansing, Michigan)
- College: Michigan State (2012–2016)
- NBA draft: 2016: 1st round, 14th overall pick
- Drafted by: Chicago Bulls
- Playing career: 2016–present

Career history
- 2016–2021: Chicago Bulls
- 2017, 2019: →Windy City Bulls
- 2021–2022: Cleveland Cavaliers
- 2022: Utah Jazz
- 2022–2023: Maine Celtics
- 2023–2024: Sydney Kings
- 2024: Olimpia Milano
- 2024–2025: Pallacanestro Trieste
- 2025–2026: Reyer Venezia Mestre
- 2026–present: APU Udine

Career highlights
- AP Player of the Year (2016); NABC Player of the Year (2016); Consensus first-team All-American (2016); Senior CLASS Award (2016); Julius Erving Award (2016); Lute Olson Award (2016); Big Ten Male Athlete of the Year (2016); Big Ten Player of the Year (2016); First-team All-Big Ten (2016); Third-team All-Big Ten (2015); Big Ten tournament MOP (2016)
- Stats at NBA.com
- Stats at Basketball Reference
Medals
Representing the United States
Pan American Games
Bronze medal – third place	2015 Toronto	National team

Denzel Robert Valentine (born November 16, 1993) is an American professional basketball player for APU Udine of the Italian Lega Basket Serie A (LBA). He played college basketball for the Michigan State Spartans. As a senior, Valentine became the first player in Michigan State history to be recognized as the National Player of the Year by the Associated Press.

He also earned other player of the year awards from the NABC, USA Today, Sports Illustrated, NBC Sports, and Basketball Times in addition to being named a unanimous First-Team All-American. Valentine was selected with the 14th pick in the 2016 NBA draft by the Chicago Bulls. He played six seasons in the NBA with the Chicago Bulls, Cleveland Cavaliers and Utah Jazz.

== High school career ==
Valentine attended J. W. Sexton High School, where he was coached by his father, Carlton Valentine (former Michigan State player), and played alongside future Michigan State teammate Bryn Forbes and Iowa basketball player Anthony Clemmons.

As a sophomore, Valentine averaged 10.9 points, 5.8 assists and 6.3 rebounds, leading Sexton to a state title game. He was awarded 2010 Class B honorable mention all-state.

Valentine averaged 14 points, 11 rebounds and nine assists per game as a senior, leading Sexton to a 27–1 record. He was selected as the Lansing State Journal Player of the Year and Associated Press Class B Player of the Year as a senior. As a recruit, Valentine was nationally ranked in the top 100 by Rivals.com (no. 81), ESPNU100 (no. 98), and Scout.com (no. 27).

== College career ==
Following his successful freshman year, Valentine was the recipient of MSU's Unsung Player Award (voted on by players). As a sophomore, he earned honorable-mention All-Big Ten (Coaches and Media).

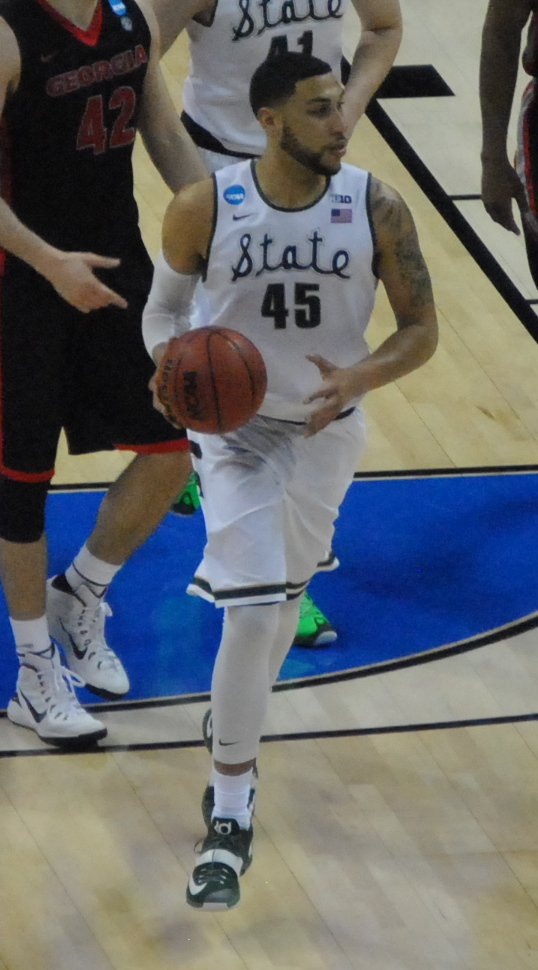
Valentine playing for Michigan State in 2015

With Adreian Payne and Gary Harris leaving MSU for the NBA draft, Keith Appling leaving due to graduation (eventually to the NBA), the dismissal of Kenny Kaminski, and the transfer of Russell Byrd, Valentine saw an increase in leadership and an expanded role on the team as a junior. Before the season started, he was awarded one of the three captain spots. Perhaps one of Valentine's most memorable moments came on Valentine's Day 2015, he hit the game winning shot in a matchup versus Ohio State and finished with 17 points. His junior season saw him earn Orlando Classic All-Tournament Team (averaging 19.3 points and 5.0 rebounds in three games), Third Team All-Big Ten, USBWA All-District V, and NCAA East Regional All-Tournament Team honors.

On November 17, 2015, the senior Valentine became the 4th player in Michigan State history to record a triple-double. He had 29 points, 12 rebounds and 12 assists in Michigan State's 79–73 victory over the fourth-ranked Kansas Jayhawks. It was the first triple-double of the 2015–16 NCAA Division I men's basketball season. On December 21, it was announced that Valentine would be sidelined for 2–3 weeks after he underwent an arthroscopic knee surgery. He returned on January 10, 2016.

He was named to the 35-man midseason watchlist for the Naismith Trophy on February 11. On February 29, he was named a semifinalist of the Oscar Robertson Trophy. Valentine was also a finalist for the John R. Wooden Award, the Adolph Rupp Trophy, Associated Press College Basketball Player of the Year, and the NABC Player of the Year.

Valentine finished the 2015–16 regular season averaging 19.5 points, 7.5 rebounds, and 7.5 assists as MSU finished in second place in the Big Ten. On March 8, USA Today named Valentine National Player of the Year over Oklahoma's Buddy Hield. The Big Ten also announced that Valentine was the Big Ten's Player of the Year. On March 9, Valentine was named to the Sporting News All-American Team.

Valentine's senior year at Michigan State saw him ranked among the NCAA leaders when it came to three-point shooting. He accumulated many awards and won Michigan State's first College Basketball Player of the Year Award since Draymond Green won the NABC Player of the Year in 2012. Valentine shined during the Big Ten tournament in Indianapolis, earning tournament Most Outstanding Player while winning Michigan State's fifth championship. Valentine, along with Bryn Forbes, were selected to the NCAA College Basketball Three-Point Contest following his senior year. Valentine defeated his teammate in the first round of the competition when he rattled off 22 points compared to Forbes' 10. Valentine was eliminated from the competition in the semifinals when he hit 17 points, needing 23 to advance. Valentine's senior year also proved very effective in raising his draft stock. Valentine went from being potentially undrafted to being seen as a potential lottery pick in the 2016 NBA draft.

== Professional career ==
=== Chicago Bulls (2016–2021) ===
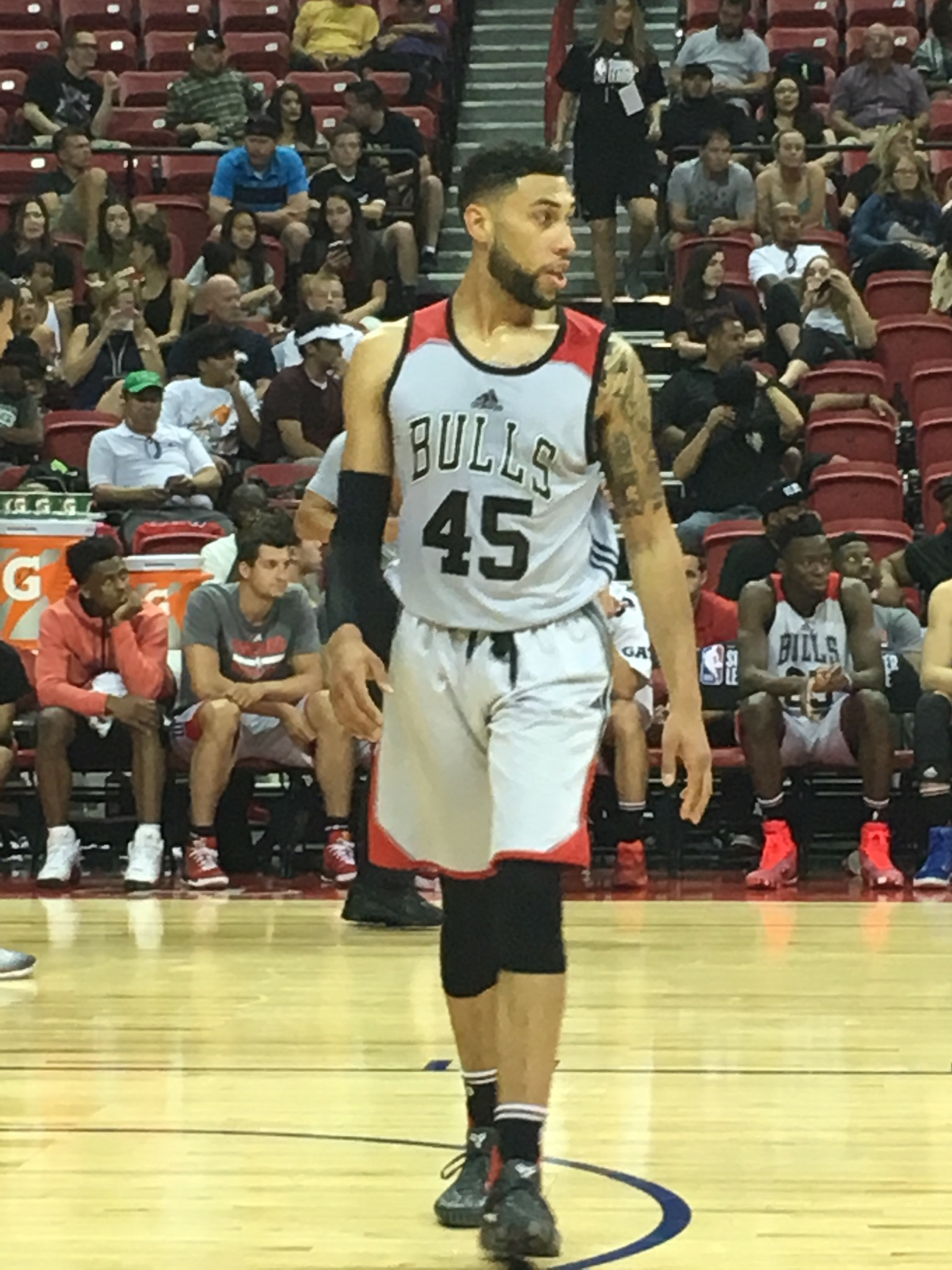
Valentine during the 2017 NBA Summer League.

On June 23, 2016, Valentine was selected by the Chicago Bulls with the 14th overall pick in the 2016 NBA draft. On July 16, 2016, he signed his rookie scale contract with the Bulls. Two days later, Valentine hit a turnaround jumper as time expired to lift the Bulls to an 84–82 overtime victory over the Minnesota Timberwolves in the Las Vegas Summer League championship game.

On January 2, 2017, Valentine, who had played just four total minutes in the previous seven games, played 18 minutes against the Charlotte Hornets and hit his first three three-pointers, finishing with a then season-high nine points. He exited with an ankle injury in the second half, as the Bulls went on to win 118–111. On January 10, 2017, he posted career highs with 19 points and five three-pointers in a 101–99 loss to the Washington Wizards. On March 18, 2017, Valentine recorded his first career double-double with 11 points and 12 rebounds in a 95–86 win over the Utah Jazz. During his rookie season, Valentine received multiple assignments to the Windy City Bulls, Chicago's D-League affiliate.

On November 26, 2017, Valentine had 14 points and career highs of 13 rebounds and seven assists in a 100–93 loss to the Miami Heat. On January 18, 2018, he scored 19 points against the Houston Rockets. Two days later, he scored a career-high 20 points in a 122–119 double-overtime win over the New York Knicks. On March 17, 2018, he hit eight 3-pointers and scored a career-best 34 points in a 114–109 loss to the Cleveland Cavaliers. On April 4, 2018, Valentine underwent arthroscopic debridement on his left knee, which ruled him out for the rest of the season.

In September 2018, Valentine was diagnosed with a sprained left ankle during the team's training camp and was expected to miss one to two weeks. However, in late October, the Bulls announced he was suffering from a bone bruise, not a sprain, and would miss an additional two weeks. On November 19, after missing the first 17 games of the season, Valentine was diagnosed with ongoing ankle instability. Following a left ankle stabilization procedure on November 27, he was ruled out for the season.

=== Cleveland Cavaliers (2021–2022) ===
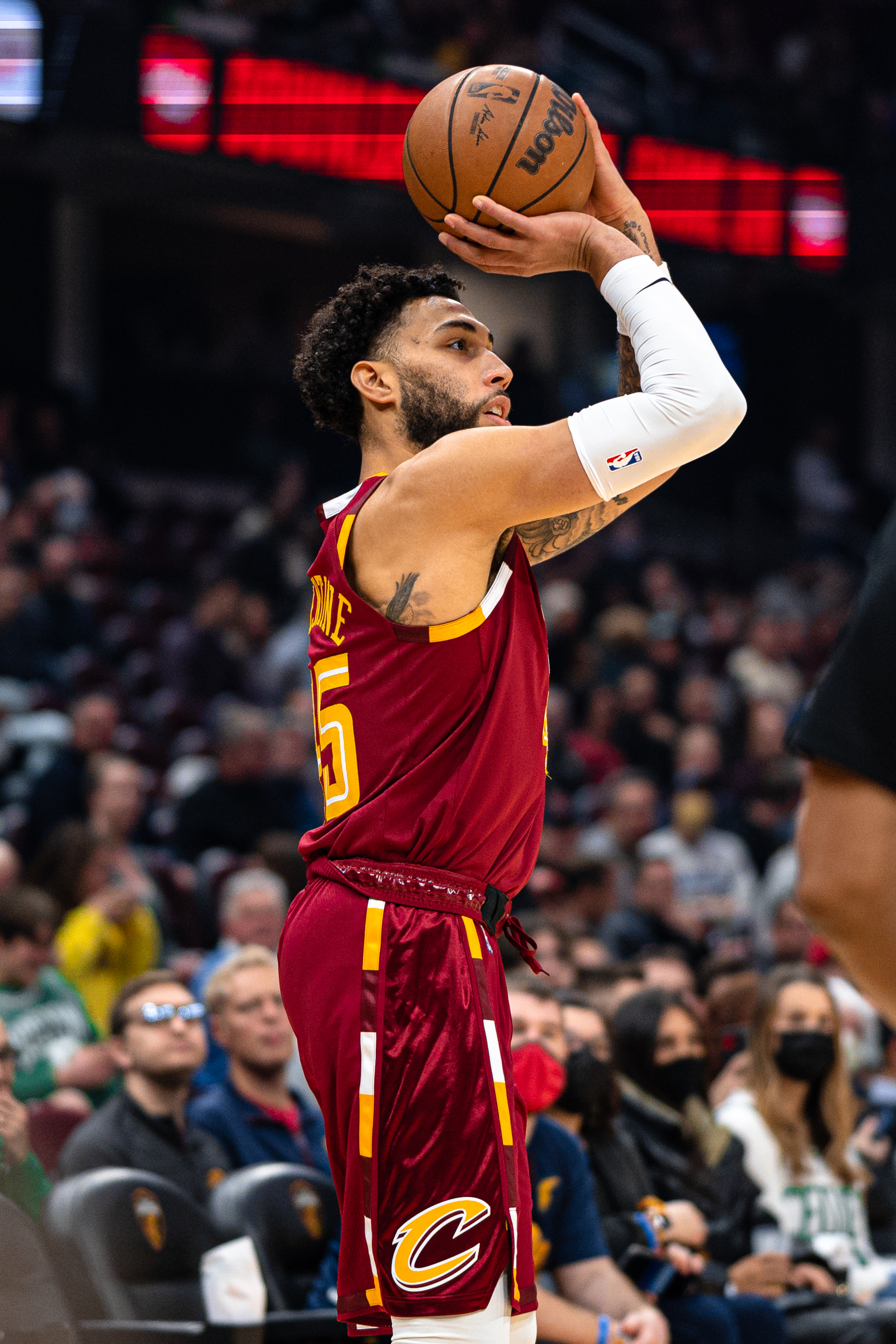
Valentine with the Cleveland Cavaliers in 2021.

On September 22, 2021, Valentine signed with the Cleveland Cavaliers. In 22 games with the Cavaliers, he averaged 2.9 points per game and 1.7 rebounds per game.

=== Utah Jazz (2022) ===
On January 3, 2022, the Cavs traded Valentine to the New York Knicks as part of a three team deal that also included the Los Angeles Lakers. He was subsequently waived.

On January 10, 2022, Valentine signed a 10-day contract with the Utah Jazz under the NBA's COVID-19-related hardship exception. He made his Jazz debut on January 12 where he played 17 minutes and recorded five points and three rebounds in a 111–91 loss to the Cleveland Cavaliers. He played one more game for the Jazz, January 16 against the Denver Nuggets, where he played two minutes and recorded one rebound. He did not play in the Jazz's next game against the Los Angeles Lakers and was listed as inactive in the final game of his 10-day contract on January 19 against the Houston Rockets.

=== Maine Celtics (2022–2023) ===
On January 21, 2022, Valentine was acquired via waivers by the Maine Celtics.

On September 15, 2022, Valentine signed with the Boston Celtics. He was waived on September 30. He subsequently re-joined Maine.

=== Sydney Kings (2023–2024) ===
On July 26, 2023, Valentine signed with the Sydney Kings in Australia for the 2023–24 NBL season.

=== Olimpia Milano (2024) ===
On March 20, 2024, Valentine signed with Olimpia Milano in Italy until the end of the season.

On June 13, 2024, Valentine was drafted by the Valley Suns in the 2024 NBA G League expansion draft.

=== Pallacanestro Trieste (2024–2025) ===
On August 10, 2024, Valentine signed with Pallacanestro Trieste of the Italian Lega Basket Serie A (LBA).

=== Reyer Venezia (2025–2026) ===
On July 24, 2025, he signed with Reyer Venezia Mestre of the Lega Basket Serie A (LBA) for the 2025–26 season.

=== APU Udine (2026–present) ===
On July 20, 2026, Valentine signed with APU Udine of the Lega Basket Serie A.

== Career statistics ==
Legend
GP	Games played	GS	Games started	MPG	Minutes per game
FG%	Field goal percentage	3P%	3-point field goal percentage	FT%	Free throw percentage
RPG	Rebounds per game	APG	Assists per game	SPG	Steals per game
BPG	Blocks per game	PPG	Points per game	**Bold**	Career high

=== NBA ===
==== Regular season ====
Year	Team	GP	GS	MPG	FG%	3P%	FT%	RPG	APG	SPG	BPG	PPG
2016–17	Chicago	57	0	17.1	.354	.351	.778	2.6	1.1	.5	.1	5.1
2017–18	Chicago	**77**	**37**	**27.2**	.417	**.386**	.745	**5.1**	**3.2**	**.8**	.1	**10.2**
2019–20	Chicago	36	5	13.6	.409	.336	.750	2.1	1.2	.7	**.2**	6.8
2020–21	Chicago	62	3	16.7	.373	.331	**.941**	3.2	1.7	.5	.1	6.5
2021–22	Cleveland	22	0	9.3	.371	.409	—	1.7	.5	.3	.0	2.9
2021–22	Utah	2	0	9.0	**.500**	.333	—	2.0	.0	.5	.0	2.5
Career		256	45	18.8	.394	.360	.787	3.3	1.8	.6	.1	7.0

==== Playoffs ====
Year	Team	GP	GS	MPG	FG%	3P%	FT%	RPG	APG	SPG	BPG	PPG
2017	Chicago	4	0	5.5	.333	.250	—	2.0	.5	.0	.3	1.3
Career		4	0	5.5	.333	.250	—	2.0	.5	.0	.3	1.3

=== College ===
Year	Team	GP	GS	MPG	FG%	3P%	FT%	RPG	APG	SPG	BPG	PPG
2012–13	Michigan State	36	15	20.8	.445	.281	.667	4.1	2.4	.8	**.3**	5.0
2013–14	Michigan State	38	33	29.4	.408	.377	.677	6.0	3.8	**1.0**	**.3**	8.0
2014–15	Michigan State	**39**	**39**	**33.2**	.443	.416	.826	6.3	4.3	.9	.2	14.5
2015–16	Michigan State	31	30	33.0	**.462**	**.444**	**.853**	**7.5**	**7.8**	**1.0**	.2	**19.2**
Career		144	117	29.0	.442	.408	.779	5.9	4.4	.9	.3	11.4

== National team career ==
Valentine was a member of USA Basketball's senior men's national team at the 2015 Pan American Games which was held in Toronto, Ontario, Canada. The U.S. team captured the tournament's bronze medal, with a 3–2 record. The following year, Valentine joined the USA Basketball Select Team to train against the 2016 Rio Olympic team.

== Personal life ==
Valentine is the son of Carlton and Kathy Valentine. His older brother, Drew, played collegiate basketball for Oakland University, and is now the head coach at Loyola University in Chicago. Valentine considers fellow NBA player and Michigan State alumnus Draymond Green "like a big brother".

On April 7, 2016, Valentine and his coach at Michigan State, Tom Izzo, were featured as guests on Dancing With the Stars where they learned from Artem Chigvintsev and Edyta Sliwinska.

Valentine is also a rapper who released his first album in February 2021.

== Awards ==
=== University awards ===
- George Alderton Male Athlete of the Year (Michigan State University Athlete of the Year)

=== National Player of the Year awards ===
- Naismith Memorial Basketball Hall of Fame - Julius Erving Small Forward of the Year
- AP – National Player of the Year
- NABC – National Player of the Year
- USA Today – National Player of the Year
- NBC Sports – National Player of the Year
- Sports Illustrated – National Player of the Year
- College Sports Madness – National Player of the Year
- Basketball Times – National Player of the Year
- Senior CLASS Award Winner – Top Senior in the Nation
- CollegeInsider.com – Lute Olson National Player of the Year
- Julius Erving Award – Nations Top Small Forward

==== All-American awards ====
- AP – 1st Team All-American
- NABC – 1st Team All-American
- CBS Sports – 1st Team All-American
- USA Today – 1st Team All-American
- NBC Sports – 1st Team All-American
- College Sports Madness – 1st Team All-American
- Bleacher Report – 1st Team All-American
- ESPN – 1st Team All-American
- USBWA – 1st Team All-American
- Sporting News – 1st Team All-American
- Sports Illustrated – 1st Team All-American
- Sports On Earth – 1st Team All-American
- Senior CLASS Award – 1st Team All-American
- TSN – 1st Team All-American
- VegasInsider.com – 1st Team All-American
- CollegeInsider.com – Lute Olson All-American

==== Big Ten/Regional awards ====
- CBS – Big Ten Player of the Year
- CollegeInsider.com – Big Ten Player of the Year
- AP – Big Ten Player of the Year
- FOX – Big Ten Player of the Year
- Bleacher Report – Big Ten Player of the Year
- Big Ten Player of the Year (Media)
- Big Ten Player of the Year (Coaches)
- All-Big Ten 1st Team Media
- All-Big Ten 1st Team Coaches
- CBS – Big Ten 1st Team
- Bleacher Report – All Big Ten 1st Team
- Big Ten tournament Most Outstanding Player
- Big Ten's All Tournament Team
- USBWA – District V Player of the Year
- USBWA – District V All 1st Team
