= Institute for Therapy through the Arts =

Creative arts therapy non-profit in Evanston, Illinois, US

The Institute for Therapy through the Art is a non-profit creative arts therapy organization in Evanston, Illinois, in the United States. It was founded in 1975 by Marilyn Richman, a drama therapist and co-founder of the North American Drama Therapy Association (NADTA), as a division of the Music Institute of Chicago, with the help of Frank Little, the director at the time. In 2015, the ITA's 40th anniversary, ITA became its own independent non-profit organization. ITA provides therapeutical services in art, drama, dance/movement and music therapy.

Currently, ITA has three locations in Evanston, Highland Park and Chicago.

== History ==
The Institute for Therapy through the Arts was founded in 1975 by drama therapist Marilyn Richman as a division of the Music Institute of Chicago in an effort to make the arts accessible to all students, despite possible developmental or physical challenges.

== Annual Integrated Creative Arts Therapy Conference ==
Since 2016, ITA has hosted an annual creative arts therapy conference. The two-day conference consists of lectures, workshops and presentations. It is a meeting place for creative arts therapists to exchange ideas and research as well as an opportunity for professionals outside the field to learn about creative arts therapy.

== Musical Bridges to Memory ==
The “Musical Bridges to Memory" (MBM) program is a recent study that ITA took part in on how dementia and music relate to each other. This study was prepared and conducted by a research team of the Northwestern University under leadership of Dr. Bonakdarpour, MD, from the Feinberg School of Medicine and ITA in partnership with the Silverado Memory Care center in Morton Grove, IL as well as professional musicians.

== Music Therapy Social Skills Assessment and Documentation Manual ==
In 2014, ITA music therapists published the "Music Therapy Social Skills Assessment and Documentation Manual" (MTSSA). The MTSSA is a comprehensive manual designed for music therapists providing a structured assessment and documentation method for measuring social interaction, affect and engagement in a musical setting with children and adolescents who have neurodevelopmental disorders. The MTSSA was born out of the need to be able to address individualized goals for each group members and to accurately track progress in group music therapy sessions. Furthermore, it measures the generalization of progress made in music therapy session to other environments.
