= Anna Little =

Anna Little, Ann Little or Annie Little may refer to:

- Ann Little (1891–1984), American actress active 1908 to 1925; billed as Anna Little until 1918
- Little Ann Little (1910–1981), American vaudeville actress and dancer; played Betty Boop on radio
- Jo Ann Little (born 1953), prisoner who became rallying cry for women's rights

== See also ==
- Little Ann, English hamlet in north-west of Hampshire
- Little Ann, fictional dog in 1961 book Where the Red Fern Grows
- Little (surname)
