= 2024 NBA G League expansion draft =

General information
- Sport: Basketball
- Date: June 13, 2023
- Location: New York, New York

Overview
- League: NBA
- Expansion teams: Valley Suns

The 2024 NBA G League expansion draft was the 14th expansion draft of the NBA G League. The draft was held on June 13, 2024, so that the newly founded Valley Suns could acquire players for the upcoming 2024–25 season. The 14 players were chosen from a pool of unprotected players among the league's teams. Each returning G-League team could protect up to 12 of their players from being selected.

== Key ==
| Pos. | G | F | C |
| Position | Guard | Forward | Center |

| † | Denotes player who was also selected in an NBA Draft |

== Draft ==
| Pick | Player | Pos. | Nationality | Team | College |
|---|---|---|---|---|---|
| 1 | Garrison Brooks | F | United States | Valley Suns | Mississippi State |
| 2 | Chaundee Brown Jr. | G/F | United States | Valley Suns | Michigan Wolverines |
| 3 | Gary Clark | F | United States | Valley Suns | Cincinnati |
| 4 | Matt Lewis | G | United States | Valley Suns | James Madison |
| 5 | Didi Louzada | G/F | Brazil | Valley Suns | – |
| 6 | Théo Maledon | G | France | Valley Suns | – |
| 7 | Emmanuel Mudiay | G | United States | Valley Suns | – |
| 8 | Mychal Mulder | G | Canada | Valley Suns | Kentucky |
| 9 | Jahlil Okafor | C | Nigeria | Valley Suns | Duke |
| 10 | Justin Smith | F/C | United States | Valley Suns | Arkansas |
| 11 | Denzel Valentine | G | United States | Valley Suns | Michigan State |
| 12 | Quinndary Weatherspoon | G | United States | Valley Suns | Mississippi State |
| 13 | Lindell Wigginton | G | Canada | Valley Suns | Iowa State |
| 14 | Trevion Williams | C | United States | Valley Suns | Purdue |
