= Wallace Bishop (musician) =

American jazz drummer (1978–1900)

Wallace Bishop (February 17, 1906 – May 2, 1986) was an American swing jazz drummer.

Bishop was born in Chicago, Illinois. He started on drums as a teenager, studying under Jimmy Bertrand. His first professional gig was with Art Sims and his Creole Roof Orchestra in Milwaukee, which he joined in 1926; around this time he also played with Jelly Roll Morton, Bernie Young, Hughie Swift, Richard M. Jones, and Tommy Dorsey. From 1928 to 1930 he played with Erskine Tate and, following this, with the Earl Hines Orchestra from 1931 to 1937. In the 1940s he played with Jimmie Noone (1941), Coleman Hawkins (1943), Don Redman, Phil Moore, Walter "Foots" Thomas, John Kirby (1946), Sy Oliver, Sammy Price, and Billy Kyle.

While touring Europe with Buck Clayton in 1949, Bishop elected to remain there, and found work both with noted European jazz musicians and with touring or expatriate Americans, including Bill Coleman, Don Byas, Ben Webster, Kid Ory, Milt Buckner, Buddy Tate, and T-Bone Walker. Bishop recorded only two pieces as a bandleader in 1950, with a trio, but he continued to record regularly into the 1970s.

Bishop married dancer Alice Barker in 1932. He died in Hilversum, the Netherlands, aged 80.
