= Northern Iowa Panthers men's basketball =

American men's college basketball team

2026–27 Northern Iowa Panthers men's basketball team
- University: University of Northern Iowa
- Head coach: Kyle Green (1st season)
- Location: Cedar Falls, Iowa
- Arena: McLeod Center (capacity: 7,018)
- Conference: Missouri Valley
- Nickname: Panthers
- Colors: Purple and old gold
- Student section: Panther Mayhem

NCAA Division I tournament Final Four
- 1964*
Other NCAA Division I tournament results
Elite Eight	1964*
Sweet Sixteen	1962*, 1964*, 1979*, 2010
Appearances	1962*, 1964*, 1979*, 1990, 2004, 2005, 2006, 2009, 2010, 2015, 2016, 2026

Conference tournament champions
- 1990, 2004, 2009, 2010, 2015, 2016, 2026

Conference regular-season champions
- 1948, 1949, 1950, 1951, 1953, 1962, 1964, 1969, 2009, 2010, 2020, 2022

Uniforms
Home	Away
- * at Division II level

The Northern Iowa Panthers men's basketball team represents the University of Northern Iowa located in Cedar Falls, Iowa. UNI is currently a member of the Missouri Valley Conference. The Panthers have appeared nine times in the NCAA Division I men's basketball tournament, most recently in 2026.

== Postseason results ==
=== NCAA Division I tournament ===
Northern Iowa has made the NCAA tournament nine times. The Panthers have a record of 5–9.

Year	Seed	Round	Opponent	Result
1990	#14	First round Second Round	#3 Missouri #6 Minnesota	W 74–71; L 78–81
2004	#14	First round	#3 Georgia Tech	L 60–65
2005	#11	First round	#6 Wisconsin	L 52–57
2006	#10	First round	#7 Georgetown	L 49–54
2009	#12	First round	#5 Purdue	L 56–61
2010	#9	First round Second Round; Sweet Sixteen	#8 UNLV #1 Kansas #5 Michigan State	W 69–66; W 69–67; L 52–59
2015	#5	First round Second Round	#12 Wyoming #4 Louisville	W 71–54; L 53–66
2016	#11	First round Second Round	#6 Texas #3 Texas A&M	W 75–72; L 88–92 (2OT)
2026	#12	First round	#5 St. John's	L 53–79

=== NCAA Division II tournament ===
Year	Round	Opponent	Result
1962	Regional semifinals Regional Finals	Hamline; Nebraska Wesleyan	W 81–68; L 77–78
1964	Regional semifinals Regional Finals; Quarterfinals; Semifinals; Third-place game	Washington-St. Louis; Mankato State; Southeast Missouri; Evansville; North Carolina A&T	W 71–56; W 71–64 (OT); W 93–85; L 67–82; L 72–91
1979	Regional semifinals Regional Finals	Nebraska-Omaha; Wisconsin-Green Bay	W 84–72; L 50–56

=== NIT history ===
Northern Iowa has made the NIT three times, with a record of 2-3.

Year	Seed	Round	Opponent	Result
2012	#7	First round Second Round	#2 Saint Joseph's #3 Drexel	W 67–65; L 63–65
2022	#6	First round Second Round	#3 Saint Louis #2 BYU	W 80–68; L 71–90
2025	#8	First round	#1 SMU	L 63-73

=== CIT history ===
Season	Eliminated round	Teams defeated	Lost to
2011	Quarterfinals	Rider	SMU
2013	Semifinals	North Dakota; UIC; Bradley	Weber State

=== Other tournaments ===
- NAIA National Tournament appearances: 1946, 1948, 1949, and 1953 (2–4 combined tournament record)
- Competed in the 2007 World University Games as Team USA (finished ninth)

== Ben Jacobson era ==
Jacobson's biggest coaching accomplishment to date was in the 2009–10 season, when the Panthers made a run into the Sweet Sixteen of the NCAA tournament, highlighted by an upset of top national seed Kansas. ESPN.com columnist Pat Forde called the Panthers' win "the biggest tourney upset in years," and called the clinching shot by Panthers guard Ali Farokhmanesh "the gutsiest early-round shot in NCAA tournament history."

Jacobson also coached UNI as it became the first college program ever to represent the United States of America at an international basketball competition. In August 2007, UNI was chosen to be Team USA at the World University Games in Bangkok, Thailand. Donning the Red, White and Blue, UNI went 5–1 in the tournament, losing only to eventual gold medalist Lithuania, while posting wins over Angola, Turkey, China, Finland, and Israel.

On November 15, 2014, Jacobson became the all-time win leader for a coach in UNI Men's basketball history. After recording a win over his alma mater University of North Dakota, he notched his 167th UNI victory. Additionally, in the 2014–15 season, Jacobson led the Panthers to their highest ranking in school history (#10) in the AP and (#9) in the Coaches Poll. UNI also in that season achieved the most wins in the school's history with 31. Jacobson has also been awarded the Missouri Valley Conference coach of the year award in 2009, 2010, and 2015.

On November 21, 2015, Jacobson led UNI to a victory over #1 North Carolina. The win was one of the biggest in program history and came in just the first meeting of the two basketball programs. Just four days later, the coach hit another career milestone. After defeating the University of Dubuque convincingly, the coach recorded his 200th victory at the university.

In the first round of the MVC tournament, Jacobson notched his 250th Northern Iowa career win against Evansville on March 1, 2018.

On February 27, 2021, he earned his 300th win as coach in the regular season finale against Illinois State.

On March 8, 2026, Jacobson became the first coach in Missouri Valley Conference history to win four games in four days to clinch the MVC tournament (Arch Madness) title. As of 2026, Northern Iowa's win also marked the lowest seed (6) to ever win the MVC tournament.

After more than two decades as coach, the Jacobson era came to an end on March 30, 2026, as it was confirmed he would become the next head coach at Utah State.

After the departure of Jacobson, UNI hired Kyle Green, the associate Head Coach from Iowa State's Men's Basketball Team, on April 1, 2026 to be the 26th Head Men's Basketball Coach in school history.

== Notable players ==
- A. J. Green
- Darian DeVries
- Ali Farokhmanesh
- Jon Godfread
- Paul Jesperson
- Adam Koch
- John Little
- Greg McDermott
- Jeremy Morgan
- Nick Nurse - Coached Toronto Raptors to 2019 NBA Championship and named NBA Coach of the Year in 2020.
- Seth Tuttle
- Wes Washpun

== Rivalries ==
The school has several statewide and national rivalries. In Iowa, UNI used to play two, if not three of its Iowa neighbors for the Iowa Big Four men's college basketball mythical championship. The university also used to play either the Iowa Hawkeyes or Iowa State Cyclones in the Hyvee Big Four Classic held at Wells Fargo Arena in Des Moines. UNI’s MVC rivals are UIC, Bradley, and the Drake Bulldogs.
