= Frank Little =

Frank Little may refer to:

- Frank Little (unionist) (1879–1917), American IWW labor leader
- Sir Frank Little (bishop) (1925–2008), Australian Roman Catholic archbishop
- Frank Little (tenor) (1939–2006), operatic tenor
- Frank Little, one of The Littles, fictional characters from the series of children's novels by John Peterson
- Frank Little (sport shooter) (1936–1993), American Olympic shooter

== See also ==
- Francis Little (disambiguation)
