= Kentucky Derby Festival Basketball Classic =

American high school all-star basketball game

The Kentucky Derby Festival Basketball Classic was an annual American all-star game featuring high school basketball players. Started in 1973, it was part of the Kentucky Derby Festival in Louisville, Kentucky, leading up to the Kentucky Derby horse race. The Classic was sponsored by the local McDonald's restaurants of Kentuckiana for over 20 years from its inception until 1996. It was played at Freedom Hall, except for one year at the KFC Yum! Center in 2011. The Classic was canceled in 2018 due to declining attendance and financial losses. It had been the country's longest-running high school all-star basketball game. Star players who participated included Shai Gilgeous-Alexander, Penny Hardaway, Moses Malone, Jamal Mashburn, Donovan Mitchell, Victor Oladipo, Isiah Thomas, and Dominique Wilkins.

== History ==
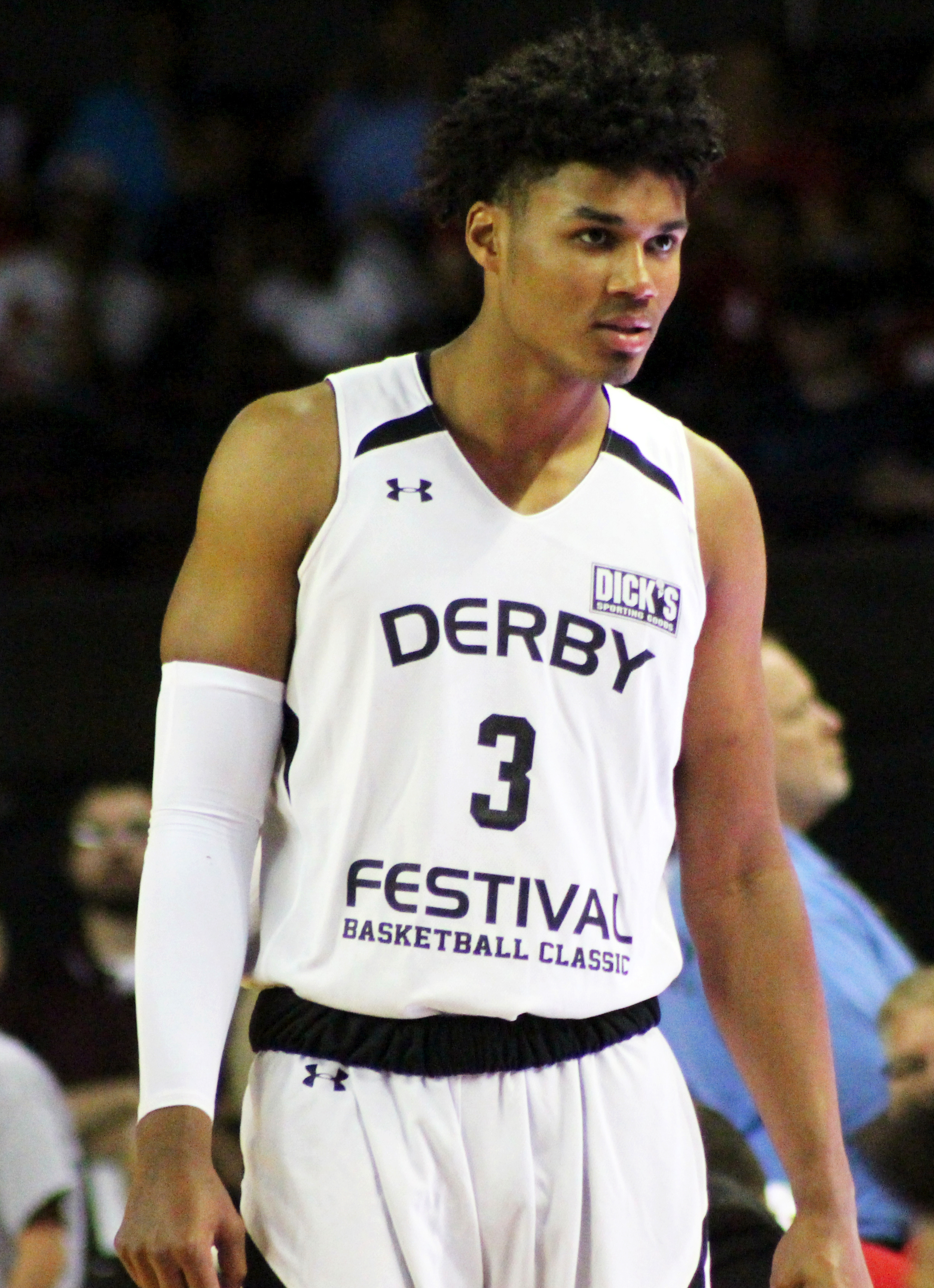
Justin Smith at the Derby Classic in 2017

The Derby Classic began in 1973 after Max Rein, who worked in the local radio industry, presented the idea to Jack Guthrie, who was the CEO of Kentucky Derby Festival Inc. Primarily focused on horse racing at the time, the festival added many new events that year and billed itself as a "people festival", offering something for everyone. Basketball was popular in the region. "The two most important things to these people are their church and their high school basketball team," said Rein. The Classic showcased players who had signed with the local college programs of the Kentucky Wildcats, Louisville Cardinals, and Indiana Hoosiers. The game was preceded by a skills event, the Night of Future Stars, which began in 1988.

The Classic began with one squad of five top players each from the states of Indiana and Kentucky against 10 of the best from the rest of the country. In 1981, the National Collegiate Athletic Association (NCAA) restricted incoming high school players to all-star games whose participants were from a two-state area around the game site. However, as games had already been planned, waivers were granted to the Derby Classic and the three other national all-star games—the Capital Classic, McDonald's All-American Game and Roundball Classic. The NCAA also limited players to playing in two all-star games. That year, the Derby Classic had only one player from Indiana, as most of the state's top players opted to attend a two-game Indiana–Kentucky series held in June.

The following year in 1982, the NCAA voted to again permit national all-star games. However, all of Indiana's top players and most of Kentucky's passed over the Derby Classic that year to attend the Indiana–Kentucky series. About 6,000 fans turned up for the Classic, compared to its then-high of 17,528 from 1976. After having won the first two games in 1973 and 1974, the Kentucky-Indiana squad lost its 10th straight game to the U.S. All-Stars. (Note: Two games were played each year in 1979 and 1980.) The Classic was canceled in 1983 before returning the following year. It was aided by an NCAA rule change allowing players to participate in two all-star games in their senior year and two after graduating, (Note: The NCAA removed the two-game senior-year limitation in 2013.) removing contention between the Derby Classic and the Indiana–Kentucky series. The Classic also changed its format to two national teams divided between the North and South. The game's highest attendance was 19,041 in 1987 at Freedom Hall; that contest featured Kentucky signee LeRon Ellis, ranked among the top 20 prospects in the nation. In the 1990s, the Classic stopped getting Indiana's signees, who opted instead to play in all-star games organized by Tim Knight, the son of Indiana's then-coach, Bobby Knight.

After its sponsorship with McDonald's ended, the Classic partnered with Nike, which was a successful relationship until Nike made its Jordan Brand games its priority, first with the Jordan Brand Capital Classic and later the Jordan Brand Classic. The Derby Classic was then sponsored by Adidas. The game was canceled in 2018 due to falling attendance, fighting to reach 5,000 fans, and growing financial losses. Competing all-star games were drawing the top talent, including the McDonald's All-American Game, Jordan Brand Classic, and Nike Hoop Summit. Another contributing factor that year was a college basketball investigation by the Federal Bureau of Investigation that drained Louisville's recruiting class.
