= Paul Jesperson =

American basketball player (born 1992)

Valley Suns
- Position: Head coach
- League: NBA

Personal information
- Born: December 2, 1992 (age 33) Merrill, Wisconsin
- Listed height: 6 ft 6 in (1.98 m)
- Listed weight: 205 lb (93 kg)

Career information
- High school: Merrill (Merrill, Wisconsin)
- College: Virginia (2011–2013); Northern Iowa (2014–2016)
- NBA draft: 2016: undrafted
- Playing career: 2016–present

Career history

Playing
- 2016: Rio Grande Valley Vipers
- 2016–2017: Oviedo

Coaching
- 2024–2025: Valley Suns (assistant)
- 2025–present: Valley Suns

Career highlights
- MVC All-Newcomer Team (2015)

Paul Jesperson (born December 2, 1992), is an American former basketball player who currently serves as the head coach for the Valley Suns of the NBA G League.

In the 2023-24 season, Jesperson joined the University of Oklahoma men's basketball staff as director of player development/assistant coach. Jesperson spent the previous three seasons with the Atlanta Hawks, serving as player development coach for two seasons from 2021-23 and assistant video coordinator during the 2020-21 campaign. He played college basketball for the Northern Iowa Panthers.

== College career ==
Jesperson attended Merrill High School where he became the school's all-time leading scorer. Jesperson attended the University of Virginia for two years before transferring to the University of Northern Iowa.

In an NCAA tournament game versus the sixth-seeded University of Texas, Jesperson hit a half-court buzzer beating shot to win the game. The shot was featured in the 2016 edition of One Shining Moment.

=== Freshman season ===
Jesperson averaged 10.5 minutes, 1.5 points, 0.8 rebounds, and 0.2 assists per game.

=== Sophomore season ===
Jesperson averaged 25.7 minutes, 4.7 points, 2.2 rebounds, and 0.9 assists per game.

=== Junior season ===
Jesperson averaged 18.2 minutes, 5.9 points, 2.3 rebounds, and 0.3 assists per game.

=== Senior season ===
Jesperson averaged 30.3 minutes, 10.8 points, 4.0 rebounds, and 0.9 assists per game. In the Round of 64, he made a buzzer beater from half court to beat Texas 75–72.

== Professional career ==
After going undrafted in the 2016 NBA draft, Jesperson signed with the Rio Grande Valley Vipers of the NBA Development League on October 31, 2016. On November 15, he made his professional debut in a 152–128 win over the Maine Red Claws, playing two minutes off the bench. Seven days later, he was waived by the Vipers. On November 30, Jesperson signed with Spanish team Oviedo CB until the end of the 2016–17 season. In January 2017, he won with the club the Copa Princesa de Asturias.

== Coaching career ==
On October 31, 2024, Jesperson was hired to be an assistant coach by the Valley Suns of the NBA G League.

On May 30, 2025, the Sacramento Kings hired Jesperson to serve as their head of player development. However, on August 18, Jesperson was named as the Valley Suns' head coach for the 2025–26 season.
