= Clan Little =

Scottish clan

- Crest: A demi lion Sable powdered with saltires Argent, armed Gules, in dexter paw a cutlass Proper and in sinister a saltire Argent
- Motto: Concedo nulli or Fidei coticula crux

Profile
- Region: Borders
- Clan Little no longer has a chief, and is an armigerous clan
- Historic seat: Meikledale
- Last Chief: Little of Meikledale

Clan Little is a Scottish clan of the Borders. The clan does not currently have a chief and is therefore considered an armigerous clan. The Clan Little Society had a Guardian in place of a clan chief but, since his death in 2007, no suitable successor has appeared.

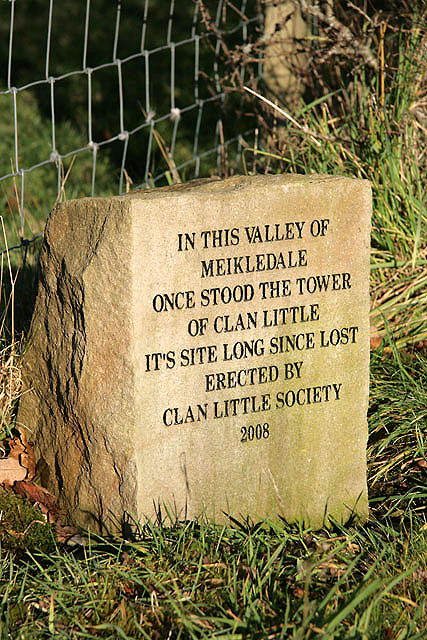
Marker for the now-gone tower of Clan Little, Meikledale Valley

== History ==
=== Origins of the clan ===
According to Black, Little is a descriptive name and was originally written in Latin documents as parvus meaning little or small. Given that the name is descriptive it is impossible to find any clear origin of the Little name in Scotland.

In the 12th century, David I King of Scots appointed Walter fitz Alan, an Anglo-Norman from Shropshire, as High Steward of Scotland. In his capacity as Steward, Walter granted lands at Cairntable, Ayrshire to Alan Little, a former neighbour on the Shropshire-Cheshire border. By 1300 the Littles had settled in Dumfriesshire where Nicol Little was recorded as Conservator of the Peace for Lochmabenston in the Scottish West March of the Anglo-Scottish border.

Sometime before 1426, Simon Lytil was granted tenure of Meikledale, Sorbie and Kirktoun in Ewesdale, Dumfriesshire by the then regent, Robert Stewart, 1st Duke of Albany. The grant was confirmed in 1426 shortly after James I returned from his captivity in England. Simon Little, 1st Laird of Meikledale, is therefore considered to be the first chief of the name.

In 1587 the Parliament of Scotland passed a statute: "For the quieting and keping in obiedince of the disorderit subjectis inhabitantis of the borders hielands and Ilis." Attached to the statute was a roll of surnames from both the Borders and Highlands. The Borders portion listed 17 "clannis" with a Chief and their associated Marches. Little was listed as a clan of the West March. [Great Britain III Acts of the Parliament of Scotland pp. 466–467].

=== Wars of Scottish Independence ===
About the time of Alan Little's grant of land at Cairntable, Walter the Steward granted lands near Kilmarnock, Ayrshire to Richard le Waleys, also of Shropshire. This Richard was the great-great-grandfather of Sir William Wallace, one of the main leaders in the early Wars of Scottish Independence. Sir William's sister may have married a Little and had a son named Edward, who became a trusted lieutenant. We believe this because Blind Harry the Minstrel mentioned such a person in his poem The Wallace: "And Edward Littil his sisters sone so der / Full wel graithit in till thar armour cler".

=== 15th century ===
Members of the Little clan became established in Ewesdale, Eskdale and Wauchopedale. Following the House of Douglas' forfeiture as tenants-in-chief, following the Battle of Arkinholm in 1455, the Eskdale-Ewesdale lands passed to the Maxwell clan. The exceptions were the homes of the Littles at Meikledale and the Elliots at Arkelton, which were not feudal property.

=== 16th century ===
By the start of the 16th century, Clan Armstrong had risen to power such that it was reputed in 1528 that they could muster 3,000 horsemen, Littles amongst them. Their leader, Johnnie Armstrong of Gilnockie, posed a threat to King James V, who arranged in 1530 to meet him at Caerlanrig. The Armstrong retinue was surprised by the king's men, and then 33 Armstrongs, Littles, Elliots and Irvings, including Johnnie, were hanged on the spot. In 1568 over 100 Littles rode with Batysons, Armstrongs, Glendinnings and Thompsons on John Maxwell, 8th Lord Maxwell's raid on Stirling. Family tradition has it that the Littles returned with many more horses than they set out with. They were pardoned in 1585, while Maxwell was briefly serving as the Earl of Morton.

=== 17th century ===
The Union of the Crowns in 1603 meant that James I of England and VI of Scots no longer had a need for strong men in his 'Middle Shires'. The Border reivers had become a nuisance to the king, and efforts were made to disband them using fire, noose and sword. Many Borderers were transported to Ireland, and others fled into north-west Cumberland. At this time Simon Little of Meikledale was chief, followed by his son, Thomas, and grandson, David, chief in 1670.

=== 18th century ===
David Little was the last Little to be Laird of Meikledale. Following the Pacification of the Border, the lairdship passed to Thomas Beattie, and David was given work as a groom at Windsor Castle. The senior line continued to David's two g-g-grandsons: Simon Little of Nittyholm who had seven daughters, and Matthew (William?) Little who lived in Reading and 'went to sea' in 1745. Any descendants of Matthew have yet to be traced.

Throughout the 18th and 19th centuries, Littles migrated throughout the United Kingdom and to North America, Australia, South Africa and New Zealand.

== Clan symbols ==
=== Arms ===
The chiefly Arms of the Lairds of Meikledale were: sable a saltire argent. David Little, the last Little to be Laird of Meikledale, had the chiefly Arms confirmed in 1670.

Archibald Little (1759-1844) had Arms granted to his late father, Matthew Little of Demainholm, Baron Baillie of Langholm, in 1814: sable a saltire engrailed argent. Many armories include the latter Arms and these have been confused as the chiefly Arms in some publications referencing the armories. Simon Little of Nittyholm (1704-1760), the g-g-grandson of David Little, Laird of Meikledale, was probably the last to hold the chiefly Arms, meaning they were no longer in use when the armories were published.

In 1997, the Clan Little Society (Scotland & Worldwide) secured a Grant of Arms from Lord Lyon King of Arms. The blazon is: sable a saltire argent in chief point a winged stirrup or on a chief or four chain links fesswise gules.

=== Crest badge ===
The Clan Crest badge is made up of the last chief, The Little of Meikledale's heraldic crest and motto:

- Meikledale's motto: Concedo nulli, or Fidei coticula crux.
- Meikledale's crest: A demi lion Sable powdered with saltires Argent, armed Gules, in dexter paw a cutlass Proper and in sinister a saltire Argent.

=== Mottoes ===
Concedo Nulli – I yield to none.

Magnum in Parvo – Great in little.

Fidei Coticula Crux – The cross is the test of truth.

=== Tartan ===
Members of the Clan Little Society may wear the Little of Morton Rigg tartan. This sett was designed by Dr James "Johnnie" Crawford Little of Morton Rigg, then clan guardian, in 1991. It incorporates elements of the Wallace tartan (alluding to the historical connection to Sir William Wallace claimed by "Blind Hary" in his epic poem) and the Shepherd tartan. Photographs of Littles and other Borderers from the 19th century regularly show them in European clothing and maud (plaid) of simple, black and white checked Border tartan or, occasionally, European clothing with trousers made of Border tartan. In contrast to Highland Dress conventions Border clansmen occasionally wear non-matching plaids. For example, it is acceptable to wear trews in the Little of Morton Rigg tartan and a maud in Border tartan.

=== Livery colours ===
Black and white, taken from the Lairds of Meikledale's arms.

=== Clan plant ===
Heather.

=== Clan march ===
The Reivers of Meikledale, a 2/4 march written for the clan in 1993 by John Mason MBE. Music to The Reivers of Mikledale can be found in the February 2013 edition of the Sprig of Heather - Clan Little Newsletter

== See also ==
Little (surname)
