= Harry Little =

Harry Little may refer to:

- Harry Little (baseball) (1850–1927), American Major League Baseball player
- Harry Little (architect) (1882–1944), American architect

== See also ==
- Henry Little (disambiguation)
- Harold Little (1893–1958), Canadian rower
