= Music Arts School =

Coordinates: 42°11′19.1″N 87°47′57.7″W

Music Arts School was a community music school in Highland Park, Illinois from 1952 to 2007. It offered private lessons on guitar, bass guitar, piano, keyboard, Drums, world percussion, violin, viola, cello, saxophone, clarinet, flute, recorder, and voice. It also had a curriculum of group classes including programs for both adults and young children.

Music Arts School began as a private music school in 1952. Pianist Mortimer Scheff founded the school and continued to head it until retiring in 2005. From 2001 to 2007, the school functioned as a non-profit.

In September 2007, Music Arts School merged with the Music Institute of Chicago. Now known as the Highland Park Campus of MIC, the school continues to serve the North Shore of Chicago with individual music lessons and group music classes.

In the years since becoming a non-profit organization, the school has grown upon its base of individual instruction by creating a curriculum of group music classes. Current subjects include Suzuki method, Adult Group Guitar, Musikgarten (early childhood music education), and Musicianship (music theory and history).
