= Steve Little =

Steve Little may refer to:

- Steve Little (American football) (1956–1999), American football kicker and punter
- Stephen Little (born 1954), Asian art scholar
- Steve Little (boxer) (1965–2000), American boxer
- Steve Little (actor) (born 1972), American comic actor
- Steve Little (rugby league) (born 1953), Australian rugby league player

== See also ==
- Steven Van Zandt (born 1950), aka Little Steven
