= Chicken Little (disambiguation) =

Henny Penny is a fable, also known as Chicken Little or Chicken Licken.

Chicken Little may also refer to:

- Chicken Little (1943 film), a Disney short film based on the folk tale
- Chicken Little (2005 film), a Disney animated film loosely based on the folk tale
- Chicken Little (video game), a video game based on the 2005 Disney animated film
- "Chicken Little", a song by Herbie Mann
- In the novel The Space Merchants, "Chicken Little" was the name of a genetically engineered food source, from which slices of meat were carved for sale.
- Alice Barker, American chorus line dancer
