= Henry Little =

Henry Little may refer to:

- Henry F. W. Little (1842–1907), sergeant in the Union Army and Medal of Honor recipient in the American Civil War
- Henry Little (jockey) in Prince of Wales Stakes

== See also ==
- Harry Little (disambiguation)
