= Alice Barker =

American dancer (1912–2016)

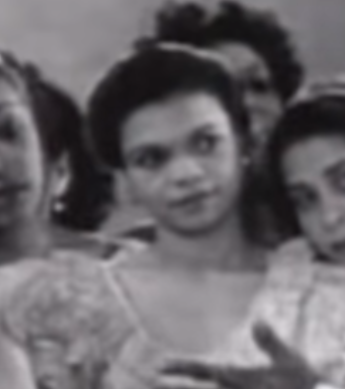
- Barker in "Legs Ain't No Good" in 1942
- Born: Alice Mary Barker; July 30, 1912; New Orleans, Louisiana, US
- Died: April 6, 2016 (aged 103); Brooklyn, New York, US
- Burial place: Cemetery of the Evergreens, Brooklyn, New York, USA
- Other names: Alice Baker, Chicken Little
- Era: Harlem Renaissance
- Spouse: Wallace Bishop (m. 1932)
- Website: alicebarkernotbaker.com

Alice Mary Barker (Note: Known by maiden name, albeit listed as Bishop on husbands Draft Registration. Barker´s maiden name was often misspelled as Baker; noted by Barker in a popular YouTube video.) (July 30, 1912 – April 6, 2016), sometimes known by her stage nickname, Chicken Little, was an African American chorus line dancer active during the Harlem Renaissance.

== Early life ==
Alice Mary Barker was born in New Orleans, Louisiana on July 30, 1912, to African American parents Ernest Alred Barker and Corinne Barker (née. Davis), Barker picked up a talent for dancing in her youth. In a video interview, Barker recounted,

"My mother told me she was getting ready to bathe me, and on the corner was a band playing. She had forgotten something, and she went back in the house to get it. And when she came [back], I was gone, and I was down there naked, just going, dancing. And I can see me down there [now], naked, just dancing. And then if the band would stop playing, I'd look at them and say, 'Come on, let's get it going!"

Barker married Wallace Bishop, a jazz drummer, in 1932.

== Career ==
Barker performed during the Harlem Renaissance era of the 1930s and 1940s, with "The Zanzibeauts" tap ensemble. Barker also performed in "Soundies," a type of musical film short popular at the time. She performed in many famous clubs, including The Apollo, the Cotton Club, and the Cafe Zanzibar. She performed with legends such as Frank Sinatra, Gene Kelly, and Bill "Bojangles" Robinson.

During her career, Barker picked up the nickname, "Chicken Little." Barker recounted as to the origins of the nickname, "Whenever we'd go somewhere to eat, and the server came and asked what we was gonna' eat, I'd always say chicken."

== Internet fame ==
Barker was featured in a YouTube video, uploaded in April 2015, titled "102 y/o Dancer Sees Herself on Film for the First Time" which attracted over 40 million views on the site. This fame led her to receive thousands of fanmail, and on her 103rd birthday, she received a letter from The White House.
