= John Little (cricketer) =

New Zealand cricketer

Personal information
- Born: 11 February 1927; Wellington, New Zealand
- Died: 28 September 2004 (aged 77); Tauranga, New Zealand
- Source: Cricinfo, 24 October 2020

John Little (11 February 1927 – 28 September 2004) was a New Zealand cricketer. He played in two first-class matches for Wellington in 1947/48.
