= John Little (American painter) =

John Little (1907 in Jones Mill, Alabama – July 30, 1984, in East Hampton, New York) was an American abstract expressionist painter and wallpaper and fabric designer.

== Early life and education ==
Born in 1907 in Jones Mill, Alabama, Little studied art at the Buffalo Fine Arts Academy, New York City's Art Students League under Georg Grosz, and finally with painter Hans Hoffmann at his schools in New York City and Provincetown, Massachusetts.

== Career ==
Little started a fabric and wallpaper company, John Little Studio, in 1921, which sold "high-quality designs [at] affordable prices" and which were "inspired by abstract expressionism." By the 1950s, he wound-up the business, and moved to East Hampton, becoming a full time artist.

In addition to painting, Little also made bronze sculpture.

He taught at the University of California, Berkeley. He also helped run the Signa Gallery, which sold work by East Hampton artists in the late 1950s and early 1960s.

Little's solo shows included a 1946 exhibit at the California Palace of the Legion of Honor. He exhibited paintings and collages at the UC Berkeley's Worth Ryder Art Gallery in 1963. In 1981, he showed the previous decade's work at the Stony Brook University's Fine Arts Center. Finally, a retrospective of his career was held at Long Island's Guild Hall Museum in 1982.

== Personal life ==
Little was married to Josephine Little (née Watkins) until his death in 1984 and had two daughters.

== Collections ==
An early drawing is held by the Metropolitan Museum of Art. His papers are included in the Archives of American Art.
