= George Little =

George Little may refer to:

== Politics and government ==
- George E. Little, Pentagon/Department of Defense press secretary
- George Little (Manitoba politician) (died 1940), Manitoba MLA
- George Little (naval officer) (1754–1809), American naval officer during the Revolutionary War
- George Little (New Brunswick politician) (1937–2021), leader of the New Democratic Party of New Brunswick
- George Little (North Carolina politician) (1942–2024), Republican politician from North Carolina
- George W. Little, New York politician

== Sports ==
- George Little (American football coach) (1889–1957), American football and basketball coach, 1914–1926
- George Little (defensive lineman) (born 1963), American football player
- George Little (footballer) (1915–2002), English professional footballer
- Dan McLeod (wrestler) (1860–1958), Scottish wrestler, born George Little

== Entertainment ==
- George L. Little (c. 1950–2014), American costume designer
- George Little (actor) (1928–2022), English television actor, father of Tasmin Little
