= Petit (disambiguation) =

Petit is a French-language surname

Petit or petite may also refer to:

- Petit (crater), a small, bowl-shaped lunar crater on Mare Spumans
- Petit (EP), a 1995 EP by Japanese singer-songwriter Ua
- Petit Le Mans, a sports car endurance race in Georgia, United States
- Petit (typography), another name for brevier-size type
- Petite sizes in women's clothing
- Petit (singer) (born 2005), Italian singer-songwriter
- Petite (comedian), Filipino actor and comedian
