= Henny Penny (disambiguation) =

Henny Penny is a fable, also known as Chicken Licken or Chicken Little.

Henny Penny may also refer to:

- Henny Penny, an Australian chain of restaurants based in Newcastle
- Henny Penny (manufacturer), an American manufacturer of food equipment
