= Frank Little (tenor) =

American opera singer

Frank Little (né Francis Easterly Little, on March 22, 1936; died on February 22, 2006) was an operatic lyric tenor and educator.

Born in Greeneville, Tennessee, in the Smoky Mountains, he matriculated at East Tennessee State University, Cincinnati College-Conservatory of Music, and Northwestern University. Little's official debut was as Normanno in Lucia di Lammermoor, in 1970, at the Lyric Opera of Chicago, his first of many appearances with that theatre, including the world premiere of Penderecki's Paradise Lost (as Michael), in 1978, which was seen at the Teatro alla Scala the following year. He also gave a private, command performance for Pope John Paul II.

With the Metropolitan Opera, the tenor debuted as Narraboth in Salome, opposite Maralin Niska, conducted by Erich Leinsdorf, in 1977. He then portrayed Jonas in John Dexter's new production of Le prophète, with Marilyn Horne, Renata Scotto (later Rita Shane), and James McCracken, also in 1977. From 1978 to 1980, Little sang Cassio in Otello, opposite Jon Vickers (later Richard Cassilly), Katia Ricciarelli, and Cornell MacNeil, conducted by James Levine. He also recorded Cassio for RCA, in 1978, with Plácido Domingo, Scotto, and Sherrill Milnes, under Levine.

In 1980 and 1981, Little was heard as The Painter/The African Prince in the Met's premiere of the completed version of Lulu, with Teresa Stratas (later Julia Migenes), conducted by Levine, in Dexter's production, which was televised.

Elsewhere, the tenor was heard with the companies in Vancouver, Florence, Canary Islands, Milwaukee, New Orleans (Ægisth in Elektra, 1982), Philadelphia, San Antonio, Washington DC, etc. A champion of contemporary opera, other roles in his repertoire were the Tambourmajor (in Wozzeck), and Tom Rakewell (in The Rake's Progress).

In 1982, Little left the stage and embarked on a career in arts administration and as an educator. He held positions with DePaul University, Furman University, and Music Center of the North Shore (later renamed the Music Institute of Chicago from where he retired in 2003. While he was at the music institute, he helped develop the Institute for Therapy through the Arts.

At the age of sixty-nine, Frank Little died of complications from cardiac arrest in Skokie, Illinois, leaving behind a wife and four children.

== Videography ==
- Berg: Lulu (Migenes, Lear, Riegel, Mazura; Levine, Dexter, 1980) [live] Metropolitan Opera

== Bibliography ==
- Who's Who in Opera, edited by Maria F. Rich, Arno Press, 1976.
- "Frank Little 1936-2006," by Dave Wischnowsky, Chicago Tribune, February 27, 2006.
- "Tenor Frank Little Dies at 69," by Vivien Schweitzer, Playbill, March 6, 2006.
