= Andrew Little =

Andrew Little or Andy Little may refer to:

- Andrew Little (Canadian politician) (1919–1993), member of the Alberta Legislative Assembly
- Andrew Little (footballer) (born 1989), Northern Irish footballer
- Andrew Little (New Zealand politician) (born 1965), leader of the New Zealand Labour Party (2014–2017)
- Andrew George Little (1863–1945), English historian
- Andrew Little (rugby) (1880–1960), Scottish rugby union and rugby league player
