= Jack Little =

Jack Little may refer to:

- John N. Little, known as Jack, American electrical engineer and CEO of MathWorks / co-author of MATLAB.
- Jack Little (songwriter) (1899–1956), British-born American composer and songwriter
- Jack Little (outfielder) (1891–1961), American baseball outfielder
- Jack Little (pitcher) (born 1998), American baseball pitcher
- Jack Little (rugby league), Australian rugby league footballer
- Jack Little (broadcaster) (1908–1986), American-Australian radio and television presenter, wrestling commentator
- Jack Little (politician) (1914–1988), Australian politician
- Jack Little (American football) (1931–2016), American football player and coach
- Jack Little (footballer) (1885–1965), footballer for Crystal Palace

== See also ==
- John Little (disambiguation)
