= Mark Little =

Mark Little may refer to:

- Mark Little (Australian actor) (born 1959), Australian actor, television presenter and comedian
- Mark Little (journalist) (born 1968), Irish journalist, television presenter and author
- Mark Little (baseball) (born 1972), former baseball player
- Mark Little (footballer) (born 1988), English footballer
- Mark Little (Canadian comedian), member of the sketch-comedy group Picnicface, based in Halifax, Nova Scotia

== See also ==
- Mark Littell (1953–2022), baseball player
