= Walter Little =

Walter Little may refer to:

- Walter Little (politician) (1877–1961), Canadian politician
- Wally Little (footballer) (1897–1976), English footballer
- Wally Little (speedway rider) (1909–1974), Australian speedway rider
- Walter Little (rugby union) (born 1969), former New Zealand rugby player
- Walter J. Little (1894–1960), served in the California legislature
