= Henry F. W. Little =

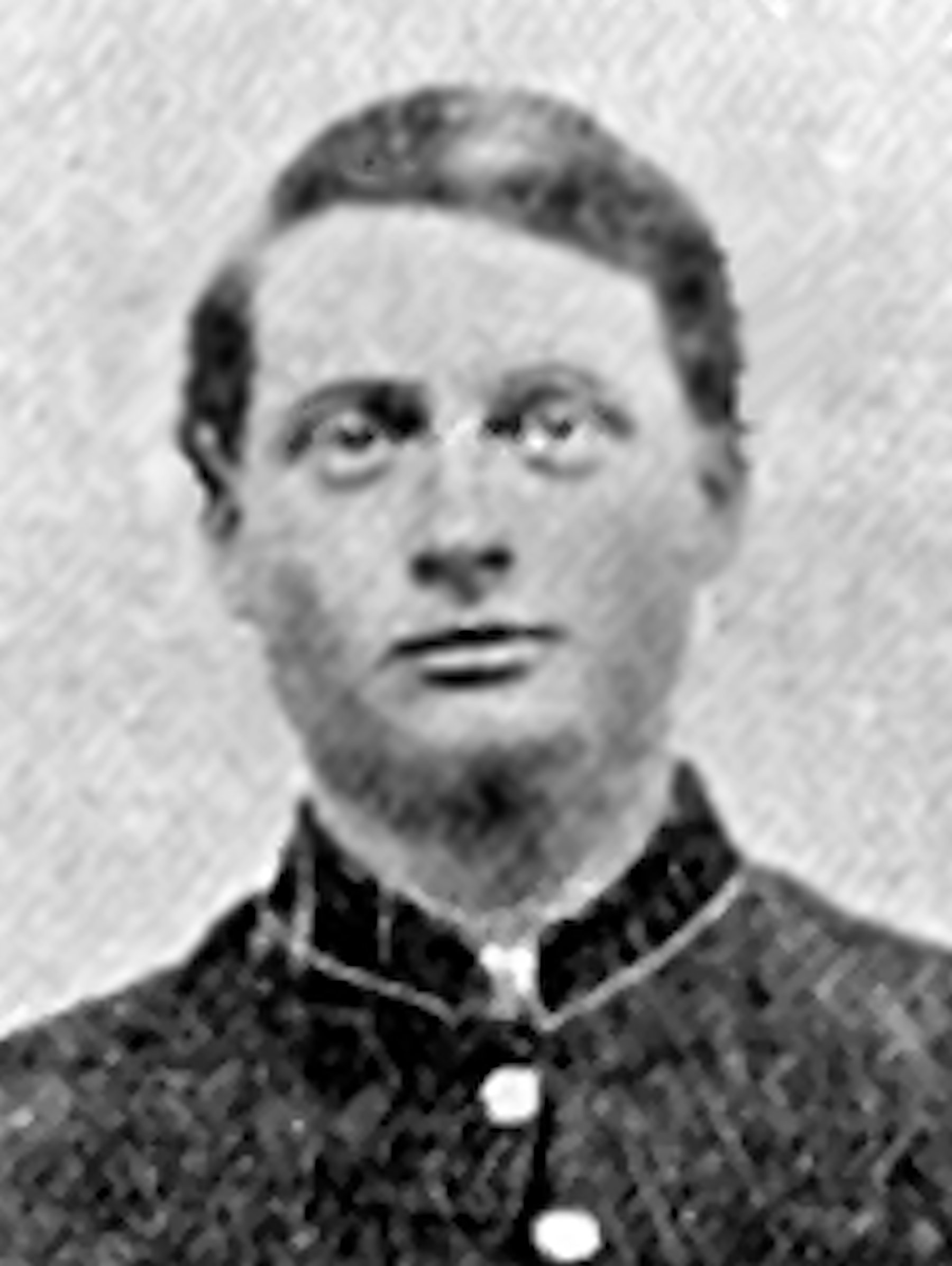
- Henry F. W. Little c1865
- Born: June 27, 1842; Manchester, New Hampshire
- Died: February 7, 1907 (aged 64)
- Burial place: Manchester, New Hampshire
- Military career
- Allegiance: United States of America; Union
- Branch: United States Army; Union Army
- Rank: Sergeant
- Units: Company D, 7th New Hampshire Volunteer Infantry Regiment
- Conflicts: American Civil War
- Awards: Medal of Honor

Henry F. W. Little (June 27, 1842 – February 7, 1907) was a Sergeant in the 7th New Hampshire Infantry, Union Army, and a Medal of Honor recipient for his actions in the American Civil War.

In 1896, he published a history of his regiment under the title The Seventh Regiment New Hampshire Volunteers in the War of the Rebellion.

== Medal of Honor citation ==
Rank and organization: Sergeant, Company D, 7th New Hampshire Infantry. Place and date: Near Richmond, Va., September 1864. Entered service at: New Hampshire. Birth: Manchester, N.H. Date of issue: January 14, 1870.

Citation:

Gallantry on the skirmish line.

== See also ==
- List of Medal of Honor recipients
- List of American Civil War Medal of Honor recipients: G–L
