= John Little (basketball) =

American basketball player and coach (born 1984)

Phoenix Suns
- Title: Assistant coach
- League: NBA

Personal information
- Born: September 24, 1984 (age 42) Peoria, Illinois, U.S.
- Listed height: 6 ft 0 in (1.83 m)
- Listed weight: 197 lb (89 kg)

Career information
- High school: Richwoods (Peoria, Illinois)
- College: Northern Iowa (2002–2006)
- NBA draft: 2006: undrafted
- Playing career: 2007–2016
- Position: Shooting guard
- Coaching career: 2019–present

Career history

Playing
- 2008–2011: BG Göttingen
- 2011–2013: s.Oliver Baskets
- 2014–2015: MHP Riesen Ludwigsburg
- 2015–2016: Fraport Skyliners
- 2016: Science City Jena

Coaching
- 2019–2023: Wisconsin Herd (assistant)
- 2023–2024: Maine Celtics (assistant)
- 2024–2025: Valley Suns
- 2025–present: Phoenix Suns (assistant)

Career highlights
- FIBA Europe Cup champion (2016); EuroChallenge champion (2010)

John Emery Little (born September 24, 1984) is an American basketball coach and former player who currently serves as an assistant coach for the Phoenix Suns of the National Basketball Association (NBA). In his playing career, Little played the shooting guard position.

== Playing career ==
On October 10, 2016, Little signed a four-year deal with the German club Science City Jena, but two sides parted ways on November 18.

== Coaching career ==
Following the close of his professional career, Little became video coordinator at his alma mater, Northern Iowa for two seasons. Little was announced as a part of the Wisconsin Herd coaching staff on September 24, 2019.

On November 2, 2023, Little was named Associate Head Coach by the Maine Celtics.

After a season up in Maine, Little would be promoted to head coach for the inaugural season of the Valley Suns in the NBA G League. On July 19, 2025, Little was hired to serve as an assistant coach on the Phoenix Suns' coaching staff under head coach Jordan Ott.
