= Jason Little =

Jason Little may refer to:

- Jason Little (singer-songwriter), American singer, songwriter
- Jason Little (cartoonist) (born 1970), American cartoonist
- Jason Little (rugby union) (born 1970), Australian rugby union player
