= William Little =

William Little or Billy Little may refer to:

- William Brian Little (1942–2000), founding partner of Forstmann Little & Company, a private equity firm
- William Carruthers Little (1820–1881), Ontario farmer and political figure
- William H. Little, founder of the Little Motor Car Company 1911–1913
- William John Little (1810–1894), English surgeon who identified cerebral palsy in children
- William Little (Australian poet) (1839–1916), Australian fiction writer and poet
- William Little (Pittsburgh mayor) (1809–1887), politician in Pittsburgh
- William Grady Little (born 1950), former manager of the Boston Red Sox and Los Angeles Dodgers
- William Little (politician) (1840–1902), member of the Queensland Legislative Assembly, Australia
- William McCarty Little (1845–1915), United States Navy officer
- William Nelson Little, court martialed in 1915 on charges of negligence during his inspection of the submarine USS K-2
- Billy Little (1940–2026), Scottish footballer
- Billy Little (1900s rugby league), English rugby league footballer who played in the 1930s and 1940s
- Billy Little (rugby league, born 1911) (1911–2004), rugby league footballer who played in the 1930s for England, and Barrow
