= Thomas Little (disambiguation) =

Thomas Little (1886–1985) was a Hollywood set decorator.

Thomas Little may also refer to:

- Thomas Little, pseudonym of publisher John Joseph Stockdale
- Thomas Little (rugby union) (1874–1933), Irish rugby union player
- Sir Frank Little (bishop) (Thomas Francis Little, 1925–2008), Roman Catholic archbishop of Melbourne
- Thomas Shepherd Little (1845–1910), British member of parliament for Whitehaven
- Tom Little (optometrist) (1949–2010), American optometrist killed in Afghanistan
- Tom Little (cartoonist) (1898–1972), Pulitzer Prize–winning editorial cartoonist
- Tommy Little (footballer, born 1872), Scottish footballer for Barnsley, Derby County, Luton Town and Manchester City
- Tommy Little (footballer, born 1890) (1890–1927), English footballer for Bradford Park Avenue and Stoke
- Tommy Little (comedian) (born 1985), Australian comedian, writer, actor, and presenter
- Tom Little (boxer) (born 1987), British former heavyweight professional boxer

== See also ==
- Thomas Little Shell (died 1901), chief of the Ojibwa tribe of indigenous Americans
- Sir Thomas Little Heath (1861–1940), British civil servant, mathematician, classical scholar
