= Bryan Little (disambiguation) =

Bryan Little (born 1987) is a Canadian ice hockey player.

Bryan or Brian Little may also refer to:

- Bryan Little (baseball) (born 1959), American baseball player
- Bryan Little (footballer) (born 1978), Scottish footballer
- Brian Little (born 1953), English football manager and former player
- William Brian Little (1942–2000), known as Brian Little, American businessman
