= David Little =

David Little may refer to:

- David Little (cricketer) (born 1974), New Zealand cricketer
- David Little (linebacker) (1959–2005), professional American football linebacker for the Pittsburgh Steelers
- David Little (tight end) (born 1961), former professional American football tight end for the Philadelphia Eagles
- David John Little (died 1984), MP in the Northern Ireland Parliament for West Down
- David T. Little (born 1978), American composer and drummer
- David M. Little (1861–1923), American businessman and politician from Salem, Massachusetts
