= Valley Suns =

American professional basketball team of the NBA G League

- League: NBA G League
- Founded: 2024
- History: Valley Suns; 2024–present
- Arena: Mullett Arena
- Location: Tempe, Arizona
- Team colors: Purple, orange, black, white
- Main sponsor: Goodwill of Central and Northern Arizona; Gila River Resorts & Casinos
- Team manager: Brendan Sabean
- Head coach: Paul Jesperson
- Ownership: Phoenix Suns
- Affiliation: Phoenix Suns
- Website: valley.gleague.nba.com

The Valley Suns are an American professional basketball team in the NBA G League based in Tempe, Arizona. They are affiliated with the Phoenix Suns, and play their home games at the Mullett Arena on the campus of Arizona State University.

== History ==
On April 12, 2016, the Phoenix Suns announced that they had purchased the Bakersfield Jam and would be relocating the team to Prescott Valley, Arizona, rebranding the team to the Northern Arizona Suns. On July 29, 2020, during the COVID-19 pandemic, the Detroit Pistons announced that they had purchased the franchise from the Phoenix Suns (who were owned by Robert Sarver at the time) and that following the Northern Arizona team skipping out on the pandemic-shortened 2020–21 season entirely, the Pistons would move that team to Detroit to play as the Motor City Cruise. With the creation of the Rip City Remix, the affiliate of the Portland Trail Blazers ahead of the 2023–24 season, the Suns were left as the only team without a G League affiliate. However, months after the NBA approved of Mat Ishbia's primary ownership of the Phoenix Suns after they had previously suspended Sarver for the entire 2022–23 NBA season, Ishbia noted that bringing in a new G League team for the Suns as early as the 2024–25 season would be a top priority for him.

On February 14, 2024, the Phoenix Suns announced that they acquired the right to own and operate their new G League affiliate in Phoenix, marking the first time all 30 NBA teams had G League affiliates. The team revealed their name, logo, and arena on May 22. An expansion draft was held on June 13, where the Suns selected 14 unprotected returning players, with two of them including former NBA champion Quinndary Weatherspoon and former Phoenix Suns player Théo Maledon. On September 3, the G League announced the Valley Suns' inaugural schedule, with their opening game being on the road on November 8 against the Santa Cruz Warriors and their home debut being three days later against the Stockton Kings as a part of the newly minted Tip-Off Tournament. A day after that, the Valley Suns made their first ever trade by trading a 2025 first-round pick in the 2025 NBA G League Draft to the defending champion Oklahoma City Blue in exchange for guard Jaden Shackelford. The Valley Suns would then make three more trades during the month of September and two more trades in the month of October, with two of their moves involving the Austin Spurs and two more moves also involving the Indiana Mad Ants, including one that featured a six-team trade.

During their first season of play, the Valley Suns would lead the entire West Division with a 10–4 record to qualify for the newly rebranded Tip-Off Tournament (formerly known as the Showcase Tournament). However, the Suns squad would falter as the #5 seed to the eventual champions of the tournament, the #4 seed Westchester Knicks by a 127–119 defeat. By the end of their first season of play, the Valley Suns franchise would make it to the G League playoffs, getting in a three-way tie for the last three playoff spots in the Western Conference between the Santa Cruz Warriors and Rio Grande Valley Vipers with a 20–14 record. By virtue of tiebreakers, the Valley Suns acquired the #5 seed ahead of the Vipers, but behind the Warriors and later facing off against them in the first round. The Valley Suns would win their first ever playoff match 131–127 over Santa Cruz, but they would lose their second playoff match in the conference semifinals with a 122–114 loss to the eventual G League champions that season, the #1 seed Stockton Kings.

On July 19, 2025, head coach John Little was hired onto the Phoenix Suns properly as an assistant coach under the coaching staff led by their newest head coach, Jordan Ott. As such, the Valley Suns would enter their second season with a new head coach leading the team, which was announced on August 18, 2025 to be Paul Jesperson (who was an assistant coach for the team the previous season) taking on the role.

== Season-by-season ==
Season	Conference	Regular season				Postseason results	Head coach
Season	Conference	Finish	Wins	Losses	Pct.	Postseason results	Head coach
Valley Suns
2024–25	Western	5th	20	14	.588	Won Conf. Quarterfinals (Santa Cruz) 131–127; Lost Conf. Semifinal (Stockton) 114–122	John Little
2025–26	Western	14th	11	25	.306	Did not qualify	Paul Jesperson
Regular season record			31	39	.443	2024–present	
Playoff record			1	1	.500	2024–present	

== Current roster ==
Valley Suns roster
Players

Pos.	No.	Player	Height	Weight	DOB	From
F	8	Kalib Boone	6 ft 9 in (2.06 m)	215 lb (98 kg)	2000-11-30	UNLV
G/F	14	Koby Brea (TW)	6 ft 5 in (1.96 m)	215 lb (98 kg)	2002-11-06	Kentucky
G	19	Marcus Burk	6 ft 3 in (1.91 m)	205 lb (93 kg)	1997-09-27	IUPUI
F	22	C. J. Huntley (TW)	6 ft 11 in (2.11 m)	230 lb (104 kg)	2002-01-06	Appalachian State
G	4	Kaleb Johnson	6 ft 6 in (1.98 m)	205 lb (93 kg)	1996-11-21	Georgetown
F	3	Sean McDermott	6 ft 6 in (1.98 m)	195 lb (88 kg)	1996-11-03	Butler
G	11	JaQuori McLaughlin	6 ft 4 in (1.93 m)	190 lb (86 kg)	1998-01-29	UC Santa Barbara
G	–	Pat Spencer (TW)	6 ft 2 in (1.88 m)	205 lb (93 kg)	1996-07-04	Northwestern

Coaches
Head coach
- Paul Jesperson
Assistant(s)
- Gerard Martin
- Jimmy King
- Ralik Wise
- Cedric Blossom (player development)
- Rick Carter (player development)
- Coleman Sparling (player development)

Legend
- (DP) Unsigned draft pick
- (FA) Free agent
- (S) Suspended
- (P) Prospects
- (NBA) On assignment from NBA affiliate
- (TW) Two-way affiliate player
- Injured

Roster
Updated: July 1, 2026

== Head coaches ==
#	Head coach	Term	Regular season				Playoffs				Achievements
#	Head coach	Term	G	W	L	Win%	G	W	L	Win%	Achievements
1	John Little	2024–2025				–				–	
2	Paul Jesperson	2025–present				–	—	—	—	—	

== Affiliates ==
- Phoenix Suns (2024–present)
