= Music Institute of Chicago =

Community music school in Illinois

Coordinates: 42°2′55.2″N 87°40′55.5″W

- Established: 1931
- Endowment: $3.5 Million
- Location: Chicago, Illinois
- Website: www.musicinstituteofchicago.org

Music Institute of Chicago (formerly the Music Center of the North Shore) is a non-profit community music school in Illinois with campuses in Chicago, Evanston, Hinsdale, Lake Forest, and Winnetka.

Founded in 1931, by David and Dorothy Dushkin, MIC has expanded over the years to its current status as an institution serving almost 1500 students across Chicagoland. MIC provides music instruction, group classes, early childhood education, music theory, chamber music, adult programs, and performance opportunities for students of all ages.

The organization also operates the Academy, a pre-college conservatory program for advanced young musicians, and Nichols Concert Hall, a concert and performance venue in downtown Evanston. Many years ago, MIC expanded with mergers with two other community schools, Music Arts School and Lake Forest Symphony School.
