= Richard Little =

Richard Little may refer to:

- Rich Little (born 1938), Canadian comedian
- Ricky Little (born 1989), Scottish footballer
- Dick Little (1895–19??), English footballer

== See also ==
- Bingo Little, full name Richard Little, a fictional PG Wodehouse character
- Little Richard (1932–2020), American musician
