= Steve Little (rugby league) =

Australian rugby league footballer

Personal information
- Born: 6 June 1953 (age 72)

Playing information
- Position: Fullback, Wing
Club
Years	Team	Pld	T	G	FG	P
1974–78	South Sydney	57	15	47	0	139

Steve Little (born 6 June 1953) is an Australian former professional rugby league footballer who played for the South Sydney Rabbitohs.

Little, a Zetland junior, featured mostly as a fullback and winger for South Sydney.

He made 57 first-grade appearances from 1974 to 1978.
