= John B. Little (radiobiologist) =

American radiobiologist (1929–2020)

John B. Little (October 5, 1929 – May 24, 2020) was an American radiobiologist who was the James Stevens Simmons Professor of Radiobiology Emeritus at Harvard T.H. Chan School of Public Health from 2006 until his death in 2020. He graduated from Harvard College (physics,1951) and Boston University Medical School (MD, 1955).

== Career ==
At the Harvard T.H. Chan School of Public Health, Little was the director of the John B. Little Center for Radiation Sciences and Environmental Health and of the Kresge Center for Environmental Health.

=== Legacy ===
Little is credited with “discoveries in radiation biology and cancer biology, including mechanistic aspects of DNA repair, mutagenesis, genomic instability, and other nontargeted effects of exposure that each influence radiation response.”
