= An Caisteal (Coll) =

Hill fort on the island of Coll, Scotland

Coordinates: 56°37′46.38″N 6°36′47.86″W

An Caisteal (English: The Castle) is a hill fort located on the island of Coll. This island is one of the islands which make up the Inner Hebrides located on the west coast of Scotland. The fort is located at grid reference NM17185815. Located 1,200 yards (1.1 km) to the north-east of An Caisteal is Dùn Foulag. Dùn Foulag, located at grid reference NM17505908, was once thought to be a dun, though it is now considered to be only a naturally rocky knoll.

== Description ==
Location of duns, hill forts, and crannogs, on Coll.

The fort is known locally as An Caisteal, which translates into English as "the castle". It is located on the Inner Hebridean island of Coll, at grid reference NM17185815; situated about 300 metres (1,000 ft) west-northwest of Ballyhaugh farmhouse. The site is within view of Dùn Beic to the south; and Dùn Foulag, which is 1,200 yards (1.1 km) to the north-east. Dùn Foulag is located at grid reference NM17505908. The early 20th century antiquary Erskine Beveridge considered Dùn Foulag to be a dun and thought he found evidence of a defensive wall. The current opinion, however, is that it is just a naturally rocky knoll. This once supposed dun was visited in 1972 by the Ordnance Survey (OS) who could find no trace of antiquity on site; and currently Historic Environment Scotland classifies it a 'natural feature'. What Beveridge thought was a defensive wall is now considered to be the remains of a modern building; what he thought were "fallen stones" are only beach stones.

Traces of the fort are visible on a rocky boss, which reaches 12 metres (40 ft) above the surrounding ground. Three sides of this cliff are extremely sheer; in some places all the way, 12 metres (40 ft), to the ground below. The rock is inaccessible on these three sides; although it is accessible from the north over a natural terrace. This terrace is a narrow shelf which ascends around the cliff-face to on the north-west of the cliff.

The fort's main wall occupied the crest of a terrace, on the north and east sides; on the south side, the wall followed the cliff-edge. The main wall encloses an area of 29 metres (95 ft) from the north-west, and transversely 26 metres (85 ft) to the south-east. According to the RCAHMS, only a small proportion of this area would have been inhabitable, since large areas of this space are covered with bare rock. Only a band of rubble marks the wall in the east, although the west and south-west wall is in places 0.5 metres (20 in) high. There are traces of an outer wall which would have guarded the easiest approach to the fort. This wall lines a part of the lower terrace on the north-west.

When Beveridge visited and documented An Caisteal he found one of two "doubtful" hammerstones at the site.
