= Dùn Morbhaidh =

Hill fort on the Inner Hebridean island of Coll

Coordinates: 56°40′46.21″N 6°31′1.02″W

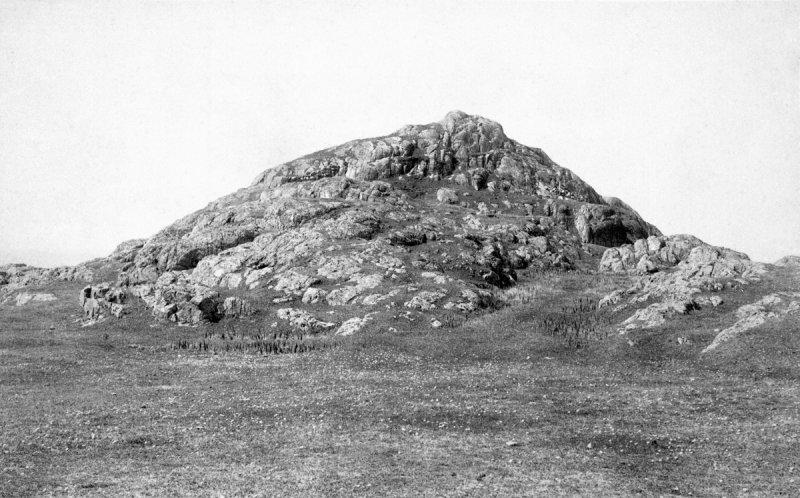
Dùn Morbhaidh, about 1900.

Dùn Morbhaidh, also known as Dun Borbaidh, is a hill fort located on the Inner Hebridean island of Coll. The early 20th century antiquary Erskine Beveridge considered it as one of the four most interesting fortifications on Coll (along with Dùn an Achaidh, Dùn Anlaimh, and Dùn Dubh). The site is located at grid reference NM23456331.

== Etymology ==
The early 20th century antiquary Erskine Beveridge stated his opinion that the correct name for Dùn Morbhaidh was Dun Borbaidh; and in consequence, the name which appeared on maps was probably incorrect. He stated that the fort takes its name from the nearby Eilean Borbaidh, and Traigh Bhorbaidh; and that the local pronunciation was "Borow", or "Borive". Beveridge noted that "Borive" resembles several other Hebridean placenames; and that it appeared to be derived from the Norse language borg.

== Location ==
Location of duns, hill forts, and crannogs, on Coll.

Dùn Morbhaidh is located 2 miles (3.2 km) northeast of Gallanach, on Coll. The site is located at grid reference NM 2345 6331.

== Description ==
Dùn Morbhaidh sits atop a craggy hill, close to the shore. The highest part of the site is located on the west-side and the summit; and measures about 30 by 15 metres (98 ft × 49 ft). This part is guarded on the western side by a wall, which only traces of survive. Two short lengths of the outer face of this wall are visible, and stand at a maximum height of 0.7 metres (2.3 ft), in three courses.

The eastern half of the hill is made up of a series of slopes, terraces, and outcrops. There is visible evidence of the remains of two more walls. The medial wall is, for the most part, placed around a terrace; though it also appears in a narrow gap on the northern part of the same terrace. The outer wall is located around the foot of the hill and faces level ground. Only traces of this wall are visible: on one side of the entrance, and an outer stretch of facing stones are also visible.

== Archaeological finds ==
Beveridge found the remains of midden material, small rounded pebbles, and the abundance of hammerstones (many of which were broken) at the site. He also found several examples of potsherd decorated with incised patterns and finger-impressed cordons. Beveridge considered that some of the finds had been subjected to fire; in his mind, similar to the foundations he described at Dùn an Achaidh. Two of the potsherds bear the incised figures of deer; and are currently kept in the National Museum of Antiquities of Scotland. According to Richard Hingley, potsherd decorated with figures of deer have been found in a number of archaeological sites in the Hebrides (on Bragar, Lewis; Kilpheder, South Uist; Galson, Lewis; and Dùn Morbhaidh). Hingley stated that this would seem to indicate an importance of hunting in some of the Iron Age communities in the Western Isles.

Location of Coll.

The site was visited, in 1972, by the Ordnance Survey, which noted that the site was "probably a dun with outworks". No trace of any midden was found on the site. In 1995, M. W. Holley found some potsherd on the site, located at grid reference NM 2345 6331.

== Tradition ==
Beveridge stated that there was no tradition associated with the fort itself, though he noted that one concerned a cave beneath it. This cave was to have extended from its entrance, on the rocky shore, to far inland. According to Beveridge, the cave was said to have been the scene of a massacre of many natives of the area.
