= Dùn Anlaimh =

Crannog (artificial island) on the Inner Hebridean island of Coll

Coordinates: 56°37′08″N 6°35′06″W

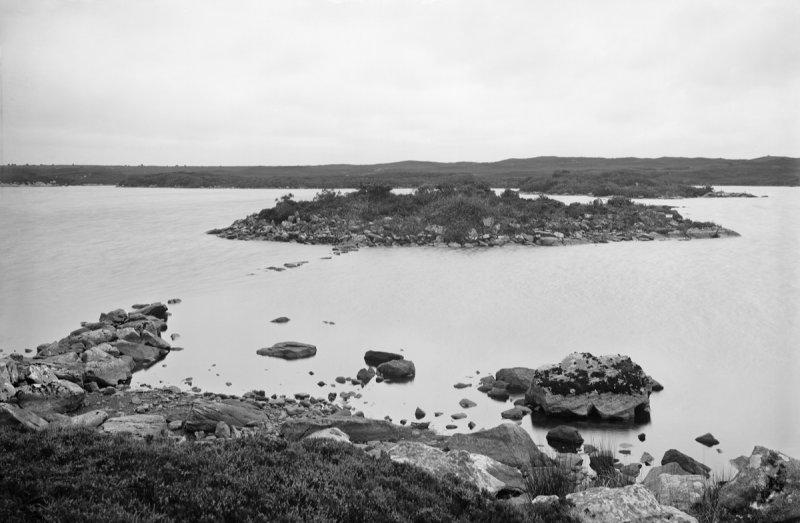
Dùn Anlaimh on Loch nan Cinneachan, about 1905

Dùn Anlaimh, also known as Dùn Amhlaidh, and Eilean nan Cinneachan, is a crannog (an artificial island), located within Loch nan Cinneachan on the Inner Hebridean island of Coll. Upon the crannog there are the remains of walls and several buildings. These remains are not unlike those of other fortified islands found throughout the Outer Hebrides, and it is likely that Dùn Anlaimh dates from the late Middle Ages. According to local tradition on Coll, the fort was once the home of a Norse chieftain who was defeated in battle somewhere nearby. The early 20th century antiquary Erskine Beveridge considered it as one of the four most interesting fortifications, on Coll (along with Dùn an Achaidh, Dùn Dubh, and Dùn Morbhaidh). The site of Dùn Anlaimh is located at grid reference NM18845684. The RCAHMS classifies the site as a 'crannog' and an 'island dwelling'. (Note: The RCAHMS defines an island dwelling as: "A small, sometimes partly artificial, island with evidence of buildings and other structures related to domestic occupation, generally of medieval date"; and a crannog as: "An island, partly or wholly artificial, often formed by dumping timber, earth and stones and revetted with timber piles or a palisade. Built in a loch, wetland or estuary and dating from prehistory to medieval".)

== Description ==
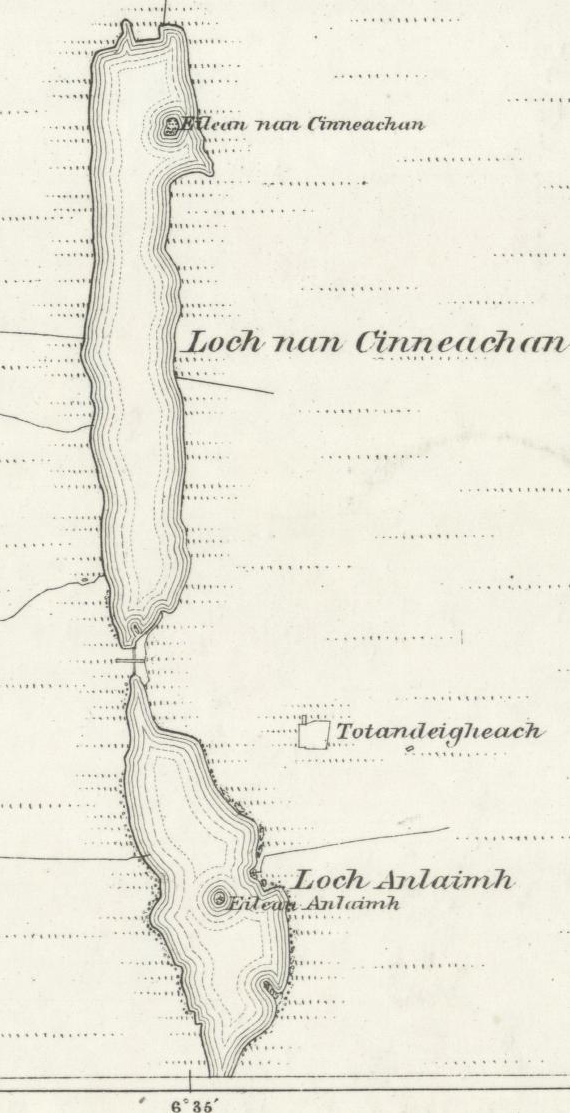
Loch nan Cinneachan and Loch Anlaimh on an 1881 Ordnance Survey map. On this map, Dùn Anlaimh appears as "Eilean nan Cinneachan".

=== Analysis of the island ===
Dùn Anlaimh is a small artificial island located in Loch Nan Cinneachan on Coll (grid reference NM18845684). The loch lies directly north of Loch Anlaimh which also has an artificial island within it. Confusingly, Dùn Anlaimh sometimes appears as "Eilean nan Cinneachan" on maps (see OS map pictured left) and the island in Loch Anlaimh is known as "Eilean Anlaimh". According to the 20th century antiquary Erskine Beveridge, the two lochs probably were joined at one time, and that this would explain why Dùn Anlaimh is not located within Loch Anlaimh. Beveridge also thought the names of the lochs were suggestive. According to him, the Gaelic Loch nan Cinneachan and Eilean nan Cinneachan mean loch and island of the "heathen" or "gentiles". During the early Middle Ages the pagan Vikings were sometimes styled as "Gentiles" within the Irish Annals. The Gaelic personal name Anlaimh can also be linked with the Norsemen as it is a Gaelicisation of the Norse personal name Anlaf.

The island upon which Dùn Anlaimh occupies is roughly oval, almost circular in plan, and was about water level when visited by the RCAHMS in 1975. The RCAHMS recorded the dimensions of the island at about 28 metres (91 ft 10 in) on the north–south axis and about 23 metres (75 ft 6 in) on the east–west axis. In 1995, Mark W. Holley surveyed the site and measured it 28 by 35 metres (91 ft 10 in by 114 ft 10 in) at the base of the island. The island is composed of about 80% medium-sized boulders and 20% large boulders. The island is situated on the north end of Loch nan Cinneachan and is connected to the east shore by a 29 metres (95 ft 2 in) partly submerged causeway. Holley noted that the causeway had two defensive features. One was a 25 degree bend at the middle of the causeway; and the other was a rocking stone which tilts when under pressure. Holley recorded the depth of the loch around the island at 1 metre (3 ft 3 in) to 1.5 metres (4 ft 11 in) deep, with the deeper water on the western side. He noted that the surrounding water-bed was heavily silted, concealing the bottom; at least 2 metres (6 ft 7 in) deep.

=== Analysis of the ruins ===
According to the RCAHMS, it is difficult to estimate the age of the remains of Dùn Anlaimh. The ruins seem to resemble later fortified islands found in the Outer Hebrides, and it is likely that those of Dùn Anlaimh date to the mediaeval period. Although the site has no recorded history, the local tradition concerning Dùn Anlaimh appears to support the view that it was occupied in the Late Middle Ages.

The remains of on a dry-stone enclosure are sometimes visible on the stony part of the island. The north part of the outer face of these remains stand at a maximum of about 0.8 metres (2 ft 7 in). A small inlet, located in the south-west corner of the island, may indicate the site of a boat landing. The island's summit is about 1.2 metres (3 ft 11 in) above the level plane of the island, and is heavily overgrown with vegetation. The summit is also the site of the remains of three round-angled conjoined buildings that are rectangular in shape. All three buildings are aligned north–south, with their long axis parallel to the shore closest. The two main buildings are situated in a linear plan, aligned north–south. The walls of both structures are of dry-stone construction and are on average about 1.3 metres (4 ft 3 in) thick; standing to a maximum height of 1.5 metres (4 ft 11 in). Building A is 7.1 metres (23 ft 4 in) long and 4.1 metres (13 ft 5 in) wide, with a doorway about 1 metre (3 ft 3 in) wide located on the north end of the west side wall. Building B is 5.6 metres (18 ft 4 in) long and 3.4 metres (11 ft 2 in) wide internally. Building C is a smaller building which abuts the west wall of the main range. It lies adjacent to the entrance doorway of building A. It is 3.2 metres (10 ft 6 in) long from the north-east to south-west corner, and 2.1 metres (6 ft 11 in) transversely. The walls are on average 0.8 metres (2 ft 7 in) thick. The entrance to the building is located on south-west end wall.

Like several other crannogs on Coll—such as those of Loch Anlaimh, Loch an Duin, and Loch Cliad—Dùn Anlaimh appears to have defensive features, in form of a bending causeway, incorporated within it. If the curving causeways of these crannogs were meant to lie under several feet of shallow water, these bends would have served to impede the advancement of enemies unaware of the correct route.

== Tradition of Anlaimh of Dùn Anlaimh ==
Location of duns, hillforts, and crannogs, on Coll.

In the late 19th and early 20th centuries, several Coll traditions were published which concerned several fortifications (hillforts, duns, and crannogs) on the island—one of which was Dùn Anlaimh. One such tradition was collected by Rev. John Gregorson Campbell, a former parish minister of Tiree, and published in 1895 Campbell's version runs as follows:

The Laird of Dowart was on his way to gather rent in Tiree, and sent ashore to Kelis (Caolas), Coll, for meat (biadhtachd). The woman of the house told MacLean was not worth sending meat to, and Dowart kindly came ashore to see why she said so. She said it because he was not taking Coll for himself. Three brothers from Lochlin had Coll at the time, Big Annla (Annla Mòr) in Loch Annla, another in Dun bithig in Totronald, and the third in Grisipol hill. She had thirty men herself fit to bear arms. Dowart went to Loch Annla fort late in the evening alone, and was hospitably received. Annla's arrows were near the fire, and Dowart gradually edged near them till he managed to make off with them. This led to a fight at Grimsari and is perhaps the reason why Dowart encouraged Iain Garbh to make himself master of Coll.

According to Beveridge in 1903, the forts mentioned within this tradition are Dùn Anlaimh, Dùn Beic at Totronald, and Dùn Dubh. The Iain Garbh mentioned was a son of Lachlann Bronnach, chief of the Macleans of Duart (d. after 1472). Iain Garbh (b. c. 1450) is claimed to be the ancestor of the Macleans of Coll. Beveridge also made note of traditions of another battle fought near Grishipol, in which Iain Garbh and his followers defeated a force led by his step-father Gilleonan, chief of the MacNeils of Barra. Beveridge reasoned that this particular battle against the MacNeils probably took place around 1470–1480; and wondered if there could be some sort of confusion between this conflict with the MacNeils and that of the Norsemen.

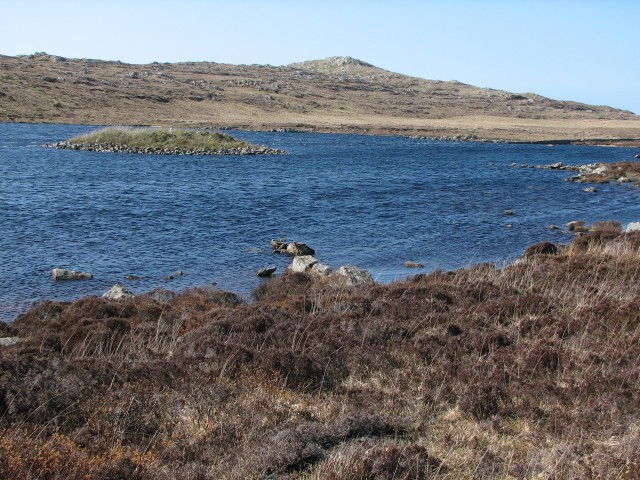
Dùn Anlaimh on Loch nan Cinneachan, in 2006.

In 1903, without prior knowledge to Campbell's tradition, Beveridge published another version of the 'Norsemen tradition' quoted above; one in which he had obtained viva voce. According to Beveridge, the events within this version of the tradition were said to have taken place at the precise date of 1384. However, he conceded that this date was calculated by the fact that when the Macleans of Coll sold their estate on the island in 1854, it was believed that they had owned their lands there for exactly 472 years. Beveridge also noted that the first historical connection between any Maclean and the island of Coll appears in a charter of confirmation, dated 1495, which states the Macleans were granted a charter to the island in 1409. Beveridge's version of the tradition runs as follows:

Concerning the first of these two island-forts,—Dun Anlaimh, in the Upper Mill Loc,—there runs a somewhat detailed tradition to the effect that in it lived the Norse chief who held Coll long after the neighbouring islands had been abandoned by his comrades. It is said that MacLean of Duart already possessed Tiree, and that one of his sons determined to attack the Norseman (presumably an Olaf) in this islet stronghold. The Norweigens, finding themselves overcome, threw their weapons into the loch, to put these beyond the reach of their victors.

A version very similar to Beveridge's appears in the 1906 monograph written by Rev. Dugald MacEchern which was published in 1922. MacEchern acknowledges the work of Beveridge and his version runs as follows:

... according to Coll tradition, Maclean of Duart, on his way to Tiree calling at Coll for provisions, was told by a woman that he was unworthy of them so long as he allowed Lochluinnich or Norsemen to possess Coll. He thereupon attacked the three brothers from Lochlinn who held Coll then, viz., Amlamh Mór on the island fort Dun Anlaimh in Loch nan Cinneachan, another in Dun Bithig in Totronald, and another at Dun Dubh in Grisbol hill. The fight took place at Grimsary.

The tradition of Dùn Anlaimh has led some modern historians and scholars to regard the defeated Anlaimh as a possible progenitor of the MacAulays of North Uist, a family who are traditionally said to have settled on Uist after emigrating from the Inner Hebrides.

== See also ==
- Dùn an Achaidh, another dun on Coll traditionally linked to an Amlamh, or Olaf
- Scotland in the Late Middle Ages

== Notes ==
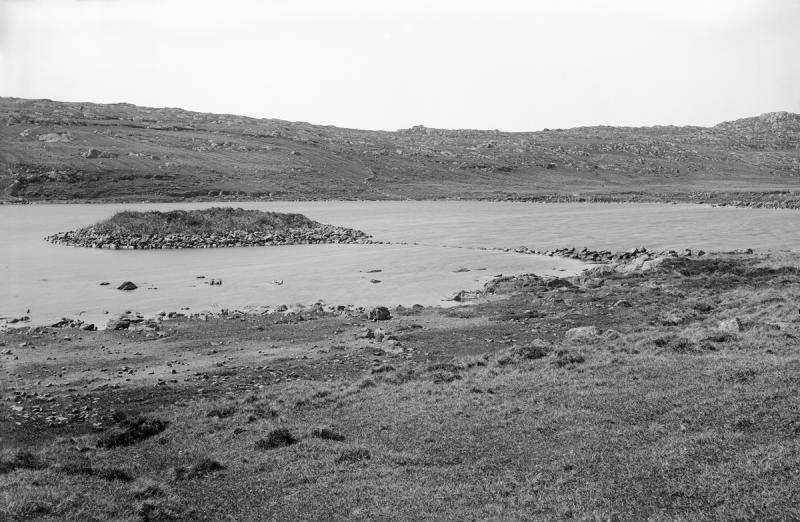
Dùn Anlaimh in 1905.
