= Dùn Dubh =

Hillfort on the Inner Hebridean island of Coll

Coordinates: 56°38′29.88″N 6°35′43.83″W

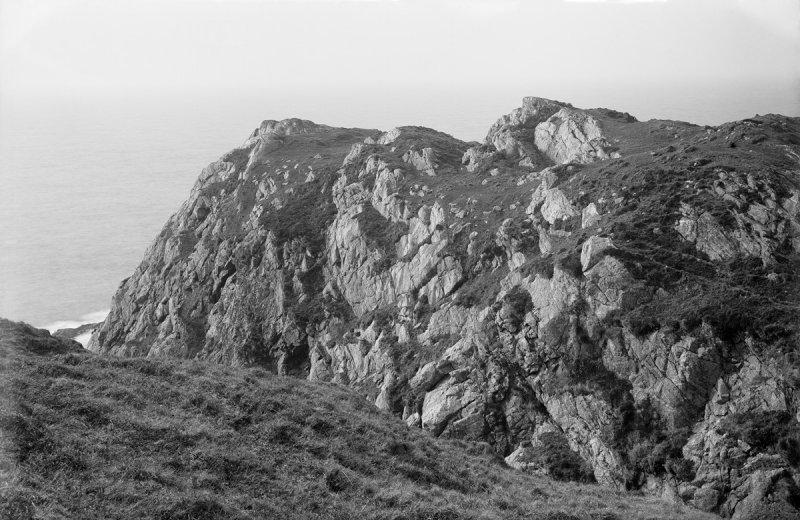
Dùn Dubh, from the southeast, in about 1900.

Dùn Dubh is a hillfort, located on the Inner Hebridean island of Coll. The fort is one of three associated with a local tradition which states that they were once the fortresses of Norsemen before being defeated by a Maclean chieftain. The early 20th century antiquary Erskine Beveridge considered it as one of the four most interesting fortifications, on Coll (along with Dùn an Achaidh, Dùn Anlaimh, and Dùn Morbhaidh). The site is located at grid reference NM18365942.

== Etymology ==
Location of duns, hillforts, and crannogs, on Coll.

Dùn Dubh translates from Scottish Gaelic as "the black dun".

== Location ==
Dùn Dubh is located on a rocky ridge, on the northern coast of Coll. It is about 620 metres (2,030 ft) north-northeast of Clabhach.

== Description ==
The fort sits upon a rocky ridge, which runs north-west and southeast. There is a high, rocky boss on the southeast end of the ridge, and a series of terraces on the northwest. These terraces drop steeply on the west end of the ridge, and almost vertically on the south end. Beveridge considered the fort to have been built on a very strong site since the west and south sides were inaccessible due to the sheer precipices. He likened the cliff, or ridge, on which the fort sits, to the one that Dùn Beic occupies.

The eastern side of the ridge is guarded by a series of walls. The innermost wall (wall A), runs along the crest of the ridge. This wall stands 0.3 metres (0.98 ft) in two courses; the inner core reaches a height of about 1 metre (3.3 ft), Within wall A there are the remains of two sub-circular stone enclosures. These enclosures are made of stone from gathered from the ruins of the fort. The larger of the enclosures measures about 4.6 by 3.7 metres (15 ft × 12 ft) internally; and stands about 0.5 metres (1.6 ft) tall. Only the foundation of the other enclosure survives.

Location of Coll.

About 2.5 metres (8.2 ft) down the slope, below wall A, there is another wall (wall B). This wall stands about 1 metre (3.3 ft) in four courses. The north-east flank is defended by another wall. This wall stands, in its best preserved state, a height of 1.2 metres (3.9 ft), in six courses. One northern stretch of this wall seals a narrow gully.

Beveridge made note of a ravine, about 30 yards (27 m) north of the fort; within which he noted a heap of large stones, which appeared to have formed a well. In 1972, the site was visited by the Ordnance Survey who could find no trace of the well and determined that the only stones in the area were from the fort itself. The 1976 Ordnance Survey map, however, shows a well about 50 metres (160 ft) southeast of the fort, at grid reference NM18415939.

== Archaeological finds ==
Beveridge noted several archaeological finds at Dùn Dubh, including hammerstones, fragments of coarse pottery, and small rounded pebbles which were similar to ones found at Dùn Beic.

== Traditions concerning Dùn Dubh and other nearby fortifications ==
In the late 19th and early 20th centuries, several Coll traditions were published which concerned several fortifications (forts, duns, and crannogs) on the island—one of which was Dùn Dubh. One such tradition was collected by Rev. John Gregorson Campbell, a former parish minister of Tiree, and published in 1895. Campbell's version runs as follows:

The Laird of Dowart was on his way to gather rent in Tiree, and sent ashore to Kelis (Caolas), Coll, for meat (biadhtachd). The woman of the house told MacLean was not worth sending meat to, and Dowart kindly came ashore to see why she said so. She said it because he was not taking Coll for himself. Three brothers from Lochlin had Coll at the time, Big Annla (Annla Mòr) in Loch Annla, another in Dun bithig in Totronald, and the third in Grisipol hill. She had thirty men herself fit to bear arms. Dowart went to Loch Annla fort late in the evening alone, and was hospitably received. Annla's arrows were near the fire, and Dowart gradually edged near them till he managed to make off with them. This led to a fight at Grimsari and is perhaps the reason why Dowart encouraged Iain Garbh to make himself master of Coll.

According to Beveridge in 1903, the forts mentioned within this tradition are Dùn Anlaimh, Dùn Beic at Totronald, and Dùn Dubh. The Iain Garbh mentioned was a son of Lachlann Bronnach, chief of the Macleans of Duart (d. after 1472). Iain Garbh (b. c. 1450) is claimed to be the ancestor of the Macleans of Coll. Beveridge also made note of traditions of another battle fought near Grishipol, in which Iain Garbh and his followers defeated a force led by his step-father Gilleonan, chief of the MacNeils of Barra. Beveridge reasoned that this particular battle against the MacNeils probably took place around 1470–1480; and wondered if there could be some sort of confusion between this conflict with the MacNeils and that of the Norsemen.

In 1903, without prior knowledge to Campbell's tradition, Beveridge published another version of the 'Norsemen tradition' quoted above; one in which he had obtained viva voce. According to Beveridge, the events within this version of the tradition were said to have taken place at the precise date of 1384. However, he conceded that this date was calculated by the fact that when the Macleans of Coll sold their estate on the island in 1854, it was believed that they had owned their lands there for exactly 472 years. Beveridge also noted that the first historical connection between any Maclean and the island of Coll appears in a charter of confirmation, dated 1495, which states the Macleans were granted a charter to the island in 1409. Beveridge's version of the tradition runs as follows:

Concerning the first of these two island-forts,—Dun Anlaimh, in the Upper Mill Loc,—there runs a somewhat detailed tradition to the effect that in it lived the Norse chief who held Coll long after the neighbouring islands had been abandoned by his comrades. It is said that MacLean of Duart already possessed Tiree, and that one of his sons determined to attack the Norseman (presumably an Olaf) in this islet stronghold. The Norweigens, finding themselves overcome, threw their weapons into the loch, to put these beyond the reach of their victors.

A version very similar to Beveridge's appears in the 1906 monograph written by Rev. Dugald MacEchern which was published in 1922. MacEchern acknowledges the work of Beveridge and his version runs as follows:

... according to Coll tradition, Maclean of Duart, on his way to Tiree calling at Coll for provisions, was told by a woman that he was unworthy of them so long as he allowed Lochluinnich or Norsemen to possess Coll. He thereupon attacked the three brothers from Lochlinn who held Coll then, viz., Amlamh Mór on the island fort Dun Anlaimh in Loch nan Cinneachan, another in Dun Bithig in Totronald, and another at Dun Dubh in Grisbol hill. The fight took place at Grimsary.

== See also ==
- Dùn Anlaimh, one the duns associated with Dùn Dubh in Coll tradition.
