= Totamore dun =

Coordinates: 56°37′14.45″N 6°36′18.11″W

Location of duns, hillforts, and crannogs, on Coll.

Totamore Dun is a dun located at grid reference NM17625713; near the settlement of Totamore, on the Inner Hebridean island of Coll. It occupies the summit of a rocky boss, on the eastern edge of the sand-hills located 300 metres (984 ft 3 in) north of Totamore. The dun is well protected by cliffs up to 19 metres (62 ft 4 in); although the approach from the north-northeast is almost level. The dun was protected by wall which would at one time have been about 3m thick; and would have run along the summit. This wall would have enclosed an area of about 25 by 20 metres (82 ft 0 in by 65 ft 7 in). The current condition of the wall is, however, very poor and only a few fragments of it survive today. The entrance is 3.3 metres (10 ft 10 in) long by 1.2 metres (3 ft 11 in) wide; and is bordered on the northern side by a course of large blocks. These blocks measure up to 0.7 metres (2 ft 4 in) long and 0.4 metres (1 ft 4 in) high. Only a single facing-stone remains on the southern side of the entrance.
