= Dùn Beic =

Dun located on the Inner Hebridean island of Coll

Coordinates: 56°36′47.57″N 6°38′19.92″W

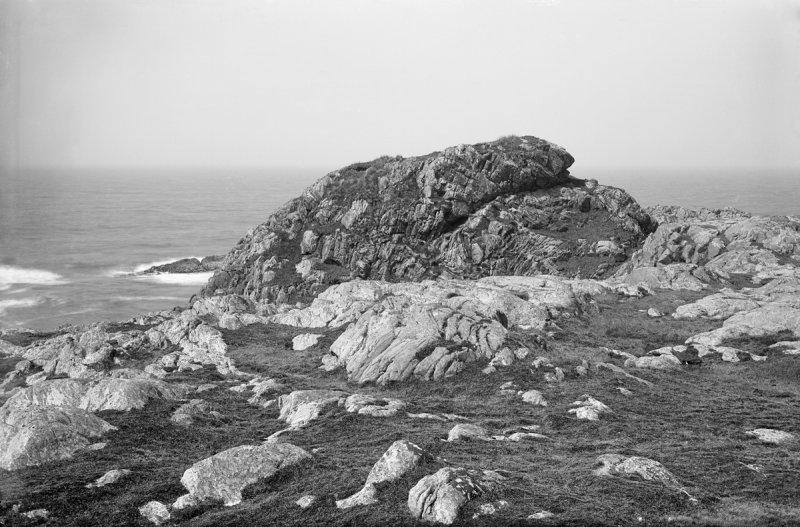
Dùn Beic, about 1900.

Dùn Beic is a dun located on the Inner Hebridean island of Coll. It is located at grid reference NM15495644 and is thought to date to between 1000 BCE to 1000 CE. The etymology of the dun's name is uncertain; one possibility is that it could be made up of a personal name. The dun appears in local legend as being one of several fortresses held by Norsemen, who were defeated in battle against the ancestor of the Macleans of Coll. There have been several archaeological finds at Dùn Beic; these include pieces of flint, burnt bone, and fragments of incised pottery.

== Etymology ==
The early 20th-century antiquary Erskine Beveridge was uncertain of the etymology of Dùn Beic. He noted that Beic is pronounced "Veyik" and speculated that it could be the Gaelic for "peak" or "beak". He also considered the possibility that the name could be of non-Gaelic origin. Another possibility he considered was that it could represent a proper name and noted a historical figure—a Dál Riatan king named Béc. According to the 19th-century historian W. F. Skene, Béc was the head of the branch of Cenél nGabráin, who possessed the southern half of Kintyre. Skene stated that they were descended from Conaing, one of the sons of Áedán mac Gabráin. Béc is recorded in the Annals of Ulster as being killed in the year 707 ("Béc grandson of Dúnchad was killed"). According to Beveridge, he was slain by members of Cenél Loairn.

== Description ==
Location of Coll.

Dùn Beic is located on the Inner Hebridean island of Coll. It is situated on the island's northeast coast, about 1.2 kilometres (0.75 mi) west-northwest of Totronald. It occupies the crest of a jutting cliff surrounded by the sea, which stands 18 metres (60 ft) high.

A dun is a building, or enclosed settlement, with a circular stone wall; usually situated on an elevated position. Dùn Beic's wall runs around the margin of the summit, though it has almost completely disappeared from sight. A few stretches of it are visible in the east, where the remains of the wall's rubble core and three courses of outer facing-stones stand 0.7 metres (2 ft 4 in) high. The wall's course in the southwest and west is marked by a grassy bank. The plan of Dùn Beic's wall appears to have been oval-shaped, about 20.0 metres (65 ft 7 in) northeast to southwest by 15.0 metres (49 ft 3 in).

In 1903, Beveridge stated that upon the summit there were the scanty remains of several small buildings. In the centre of the west-most building, Beveridge dug a hole and found several round or oval stones which measured on average about an inch in length. When the site was visited by the Ordnance Survey (OS) in 1972, there was no evidence for any of these buildings. The OS, however, did find a rectangular-shaped hollow, about 6.5 metres (21 ft 4 in) by about 3.0 metres (9 ft 10 in), which was considered to have been his excavation. In 1980, a group representing the Royal Commission on the Ancient and Historical Monuments of Scotland (RCAHMS) visited the site and their survey of the interior of the dun described much of it as being unsuitable for habitation because of the rocky outcrops. The RCAHMS group discerned that the rest of the summit was occupied by a single building, of which only the foundation remains. This building lies on its long axis northwest and southeast. It measures 3.0 metres (9 ft 10 in) 7.6 by 4.6 metres (24 ft 11 in by 15 ft 1 in); the walls are on average 0.6 metres (2 ft 0 in) thick and 0.3 metres (1 ft 0 in) high. Near the centre of the north-eastern wall, there is an entrance which leads to an irregular hollow between two outcrops. At the northern end of the site there is minor landslip which shows that the surrounding soil contained some burnt bone and potsherds; and that it had accumulated 0.6 metres (2 ft 0 in) deep before the construction of the rectangular-shaped building.

Below the cliff, in the east, there is a natural gully within the rock. Beveridge stated that this natural rampart was likely artificially strengthened; however, the OS found no evidence to support this. The OS group could not find any evidence for an entrance to the dun, but noted that it was presumed to have been located in the northeast.

== Archaeological finds ==
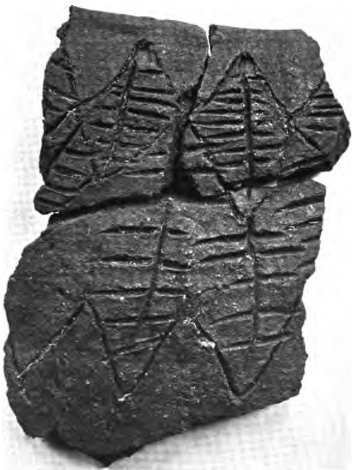
Patterned pottery found in the midden of Dùn Beic.

In 1903, Beveridge excavated the centre of one of the buildings he claimed to have been located at the summit. He found several round or oval stones which measured on average about an inch in length; and noted that such finds were commonly found on the duns of Coll and Tiree. Along the southwest edge of the dun, upon the top of the cliff, Beveridge found more of the same pebbles, as well as many fragments of hammerstones and pottery (some of which he described as "well patterned"). Along the dun's almost non-existent walls, he found two pieces of flint (although he consented that they were rough and of poor quality). Beveridge noted that finds of flint were scarce throughout the duns on Coll and the nearby island of Tiree.

The OS team which visited the site in 1972 noted that there were many fragments of pottery in the area, particularly on the western side, where the remains of part of a flat-bottomed pot were found. Another fragment, decorated with horizontal grooves, was found on site. These finds were described as being typical of the coarse gritty ware found in other locations on Coll. In 1975–76, Iron Age sherds and slag from the site were donated to the National Museum of Antiquities of Scotland (NMAS) by the RCAHMS. Later, M. W. Holley found 24 potsherds on the surface, located at grid reference NM15445644. This find included four decorated rim sherds, which were found within the dun. Holley found 13 potsherds at grid reference NM154564; and 23 potsherds at grid reference NM15485642.

North of Dùn Beic, located at grid reference NM1572056524, there are the remains of field walls and evidence of cultivation, showing that the local area was worked in the recent past.

== Dùn Beic in Coll tradition ==
Location of duns, hillforts, and crannogs, on Coll.

In the late 19th and early 20th centuries, several Coll traditions were published which concerned several fortifications (hillforts, duns, and crannogs) on the island—one of which was Dùn Beic. One such tradition was collected by Rev. John Gregorson Campbell, a former parish minister of Tiree, and published in 1895 Campbell's version runs as follows:

The Laird of Dowart was on his way to gather rent in Tiree, and sent ashore to Kelis (Caolas), Coll, for meat (biadhtachd). The woman of the house told MacLean was not worth sending meat to, and Dowart kindly came ashore to see why she said so. She said it because he was not taking Coll for himself. Three brothers from Lochlin had Coll at the time, Big Annla (Annla Mòr) in Loch Annla, another in Dun bithig in Totronald, and the third in Grisipol hill. She had thirty men herself fit to bear arms. Dowart went to Loch Annla fort late in the evening alone, and was hospitably received. Annla's arrows were near the fire, and Dowart gradually edged near them till he managed to make off with them. This led to a fight at Grimsari and is perhaps the reason why Dowart encouraged Iain Garbh to make himself master of Coll.

According to Beveridge in 1903, the forts mentioned within this tradition are Dùn Anlaimh, a crannog in Loch nan Cinneachan; Dùn Beic; and Dùn Dubh. The Iain Garbh mentioned was a son of Lachlann Bronnach, chief of the Macleans of Duart (d. after 1472). Iain Garbh (b. c. 1450) is claimed to be the ancestor of the Macleans of Coll. Beveridge also made note of traditions of another battle fought near Grishipol, in which Iain Garbh and his followers defeated a force led by his step-father Gilleonan, chief of the MacNeils of Barra. Beveridge reasoned that this particular battle against the MacNeils probably took place around 1470–1480; and wondered if there could be some sort of confusion between this conflict with the MacNeils and that of the Norsemen. In 1903, without prior knowledge to Campbell's tradition, Beveridge published another version of the 'Norsemen tradition' quoted above; one in which he had obtained viva voce. According to Beveridge, the events within this version of the tradition were said to have taken place at the precise date of 1384. However, he conceded that this date was calculated by the fact that when the Macleans of Coll sold their estate on the island in 1854, it was believed that they had owned their lands there for exactly 472 years. Beveridge also noted that the first historical connection between any Maclean and the island of Coll appears in a charter of confirmation, dated 1495, which states the Macleans were granted a charter to the island in 1409. Beveridge's version of the tradition runs as follows:

Concerning the first of these two island-forts,—Dun Anlaimh, in the Upper Mill Loc,—there runs a somewhat detailed tradition to the effect that in it lived the Norse chief who held Coll long after the neighbouring islands had been abandoned by his comrades. It is said that MacLean of Duart already possessed Tiree, and that one of his sons determined to attack the Norseman (presumably an Olaf) in this islet stronghold. The Norweigens, finding themselves overcome, threw their weapons into the loch, to put these beyond the reach of their victors.

A version very similar to Beveridge's appears in the 1906 monograph written by Rev. Dugald MacEchern which was published in 1922. MacEchern acknowledges the work of Beveridge and his version runs as follows:

... according to Coll tradition, Maclean of Duart, on his way to Tiree calling at Coll for provisions, was told by a woman that he was unworthy of them so long as he allowed Lochluinnich or Norsemen to possess Coll. He thereupon attacked the three brothers from Lochlinn who held Coll then, viz., Amlamh Mór on the island fort Dun Anlaimh in Loch nan Cinneachan, another in Dun Bithig in Totronald, and another at Dun Dubh in Grisbol hill. The fight took place at Grimsary.
