= Dùn an Achaidh =

Architectural structure in Argyll and Bute, Scotland

Coordinates: 56°35′53.14″N 6°35′26.52″W

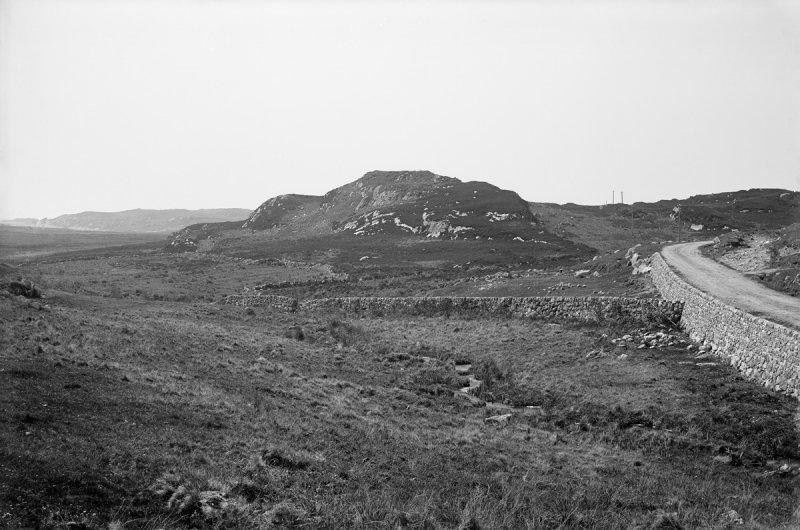
Dùn an Achaidh about 1900.

Dùn an Achaidh, sometimes Anglicised as Dun Acha, is a dun located near the village of Acha on the Inner Hebridean island of Coll. It is considered the best preserved dun on the island. The site of Dùn an Achaidh is located at grid reference NM18335456. According to local tradition, the dun was the stronghold of, and named after, the son of a Norse king. The early 20th century antiquary Erskine Beveridge considered it as one of the four most interesting fortifications on Coll (along with Dùn Anlaimh, Dùn Dubh, and Dùn Morbhaidh).

== Etymology ==
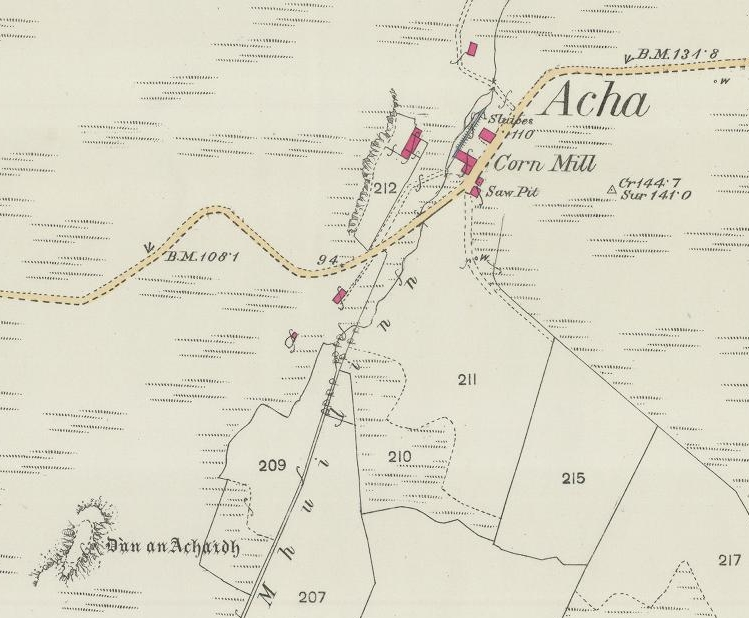
OS map of Dùn an Achaidh, near Acha.

Dun an Achaidh takes its name from the Scottish Gaelic An t-Achadh, which translates into English as "the field".

According to the early 20th century antiquary Erskine Beveridge, the dun was known in local tradition by the Scottish Gaelic name, Dun Bhorlum mhic Anlaimh righ Lochlinn (see Lochlann). He gave two translations for this: "the fort of ridge of the son of Olaf, King of Norway"; or "the fort of Borlum, son of Olaf, King of Norway". Beveridge noted that borlum is an old Gaelic word meaning "ridge"; and that this thoroughly described the site of Dùn an Achaidh. According to Rev. Dugald MacEchern, borlum means "board-land", which is "the home farm of a residence or mansion". MacEchern also noted that the locals considered Borlum to be a personal name.

== Location and description ==
Dùn an Achaidh is located about 350 metres (1,150 ft) south-west of Acha Mill on Coll. Of all the duns on Coll, it is the second furthest from the shore (the dun atop Druim an Airidh Fhada being furthest). Dùn an Achaidh sits atop a rocky ridge which is 22 metres (72 ft) high above the surrounding land which is drained by Allt a' Mhuilinn (translates into English as "the stream of the mill"). Dùn an Achaidh is situated about 2.1 kilometres (1.3 mi) south of the crannog, Dùn Anlaimh.

== Ruins and archaeological finds ==
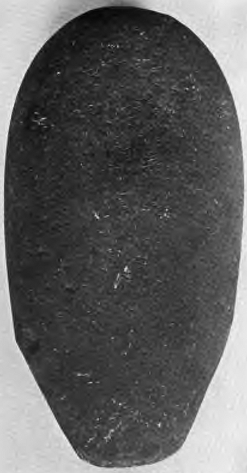
Stone implement or weapon found at Dùn an Achaidh.

The wall of the dun is considered to have originally been about 2.5 metres (8.2 ft) thick. It runs along a ridge on the ridge and encloses an area of 32 metres (105 ft), from north-east to south-west, by a maximum of 9 metres (30 ft). An entrance is located on the north-east end of the dun. The approach to this entrance is protected by a wall which lies about 5 metres (16 ft) below the summit area. This wall measures, in area, 2 metres (6.6 ft); and is made of large boulders.

There have been several archaeological finds at the site; including decorated pottery, a slate whorl, and a stone pounder. These finds are now located in the National Museum of Antiquities of Scotland.

== History ==
Location of Coll, within the Hebrides.

Beveridge suggested that it was very likely that several of the duns of Coll, and the nearby island of Tiree, were occupied by the Norse during the Viking Age. He noted that the names that some of them bear; and in the cases of Dùn an Achaidh and nearby Dùn Anlaimh, the local traditions would also seem to confirm this.

In 1587, atrocities committed between warring west highland clans had escalated to such an extent that the Scottish parliament devised what is known as the General Band, in an effort to quell hostilities. The band, or bond, was signed by landowners throughout the Scottish Highlands, borders and the islands. The signing chiefs and landowners were required to come up with sureties equal to their wealth and lands for the peaceful conduct of their followers and those who lived upon their lands. One of the lists drawn up was titled "The roll of the names of the landislordis and baillies of landis in the hielandis an isles, quhair brokin men hes duelt and presentlie duellis". The laird of Coll (Hector Maclean of Coll) was one of the chiefs listed on this roll. 'Broken men' were generally men who had no chief and who were often outlaws. Beveridge wrote that these men adopted "the Viking principle of living at the expense of those who were weaker than themselves". Beveridge proposed that the 'broken men' on Coll, mentioned in 1587, would have likely dwelt in the more remote areas on the island; and that the old duns would have offered such men a certain amount of defensive security. He concluded that there was no doubt that some of the duns on Coll were inhabited well within historic times.

Beveridge wrote that it was said, locally on Coll, that Samuel Johnson visited Dùn an Achaidh during his tour of the Hebrides. However, Beveridge noted neither Johnson, nor James Boswell, made mention of visiting any of the duns on the island.

== Traditions associated with Dùn an Achaidh ==
Location of duns, hillforts, and crannogs, on Coll.

Beveridge stated that according to local tradition the dun was the stronghold of a Norseman, named as the son of a king named Anlaimh (Olaf). The story was that the local islanders revolted under his tyranny and attacked the dun at night; setting fire to it and routed the Norse occupiers. Beveridge noted that the tradition of setting fire to the dun seemed to have been validated by the evidence of fire still visible on the dun's foundations (evidence which Beveridge came across before knowing the local legend).

In the early 20th century, Rev. Dugald MacEchern detailed a tradition concerning Dùn an Achaidh.

Acha, and Dun Acha, but its full name is Dun Acha Bhorrolam; also Dun Bhorlum Mhic Anlaimh righ Lochlainn. The tradition is that on this height or short ridge, which itself is a natural castle, there was a fort-the stronghold of a Norseman, son of Olaf or Anlamh, and that it was set fire to. There are, it is said, still traces of its having been destroyed by fire. Borlum is "board-land," the home farm of a residence or mansion, and the name as it stands means "the Board-land of the son of Anlaf, king of Lochlann." The people, however take Borlum to be a proper name.

== See also ==
- Dùn Anlaimh, another dun on Coll traditionally linked to an Amlamh, or Olaf
