= An Caisteal (disambiguation) =

An Caisteal may refer to several places in Scotland:

- An Caisteal, a Scottish mountain in the Stirling Council area
- An Caisteal (Coll), a Scottish hillfort on the island of Coll
- An Caisteal, the highest peak of Ben Loyal in Sutherland
