= Project Trust =

Scottish charity

Project Trust, based on the Scottish Inner Hebridean Isle of Coll, is an international volunteering charity for young people.

== Work of the charity ==
Established as an education charity since 1967, Project Trust offers young people across the UK, Ireland and Europe international volunteering experiences of 8 or 12 months duration. The aim of the volunteering experiences is to empower young people to develop their confidence, resilience, awareness, and leadership skills.

Until 2019, the charity's overseas placements to Africa, Asia and Latin America were solely aimed at school-leavers aged 17–19, with volunteer recruitment achieved through School Talks and an active Project Trust Community of Alumni. In January 2020 a programme opened to 20-25 year olds, yet to be formally launched, to assess the impact of offering an overseas placement to any young person aged 17–25 who meets the minimum criteria.

Volunteers work in a range of local communities overseas through teaching, community and care work, and outdoor education projects. Often based in remote and rural locations, volunteers have first hand experience of cultural exchange and the challenges of global issues and human rights.

Volunteers' selection and training begin many months before going overseas, with a trip to the Isle of Coll followed by several months of fund-raising prior to travelling overseas. This, combined with training on and off the Isle of Coll, a skills framework developed and evolved over many years, and a challenging but exciting overseas placement, offers volunteers opportunity to develop and enhance their resilience, confidence, and other key attributes that are hard to achieve in formal education and qualifications alone.

When volunteers return, a two-day course on the Isle of Coll allows volunteers to reflect on their experiences overseas and celebrate their achievements individually and as a country group. Returning volunteers are actively encouraged to draw upon their unique experiences and enhanced knowledge and understanding of the world to continue to equip others to become positive forces within it. This can be as Project Trust Ambassadors or as part of the wider Project Trust Community of 'Returned Volunteers and Alumni'.

Up to 250 young people travel overseas to around 23 countries each year, with the charity having spent 1.9 million pounds on its activities in 2018.

== History ==
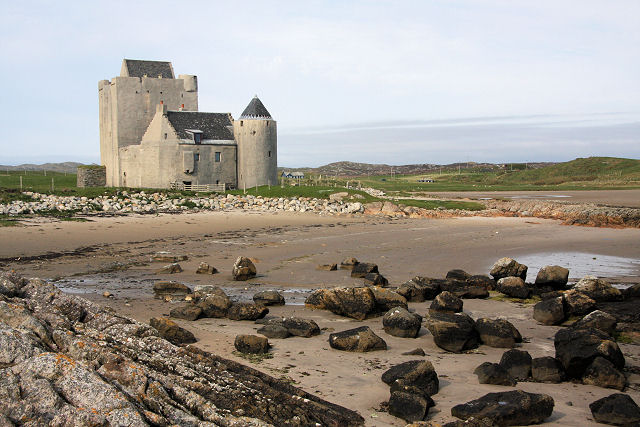
Breachacha Castle, first HQ of Project Trust

The organisation was founded by Nicholas Maclean-Bristol OBE while on secondment from the army, where he held the rank of Major. Mclean-Bristol met the grandson of Emperor Haile Selassie of Ethiopia while serving with the King’s Own Scottish Borderers and the first project was to send three volunteers to Ethiopia in 1967. As of 2020, over 8,000 young people have volunteered with Project Trust in 60 countries.

The charity's headquarters is on the Isle of Coll in Scotland, and has been since 1974; first at Breacachadh Castle, Maclean-Bristol's ancestral home, then moving to Bousd in the east of Coll. It is currently based at the Hebridean Centre at Ballyhaugh which opened in 1988, with some staff working from the UK mainland and beyond, either permanently in their Glasgow office, temporarily when attending events, supporting the PT Community, meetings, or delivering School Talks for example, or further afield. In August 2025, it was announced that the Trust was putting all of its properties on Coll up for sale

Project Trust, which in 2016 featured in a BBC Scotland documentary How Scotland Works about the Isle of Coll, is the main employer on the island — which, with its population of approximately 150 permanent residents, lies next to and northeast of the Isle of Tiree in the Inner Hebrides, about 40 miles (65 kilometres) west of Oban through the Sound of Mull.

Notable alumni of Project Trust include journalist, author and broadcaster Gary Younge, actress Tilda Swinton and sustainability specialist Ed Gillespie.
