= Acha, Coll =

Hamlet on the Isle of Coll, Scotland

Coordinates: 56.599°N 6.589°W

Acha: Scottish Gaelic: An t-Achadh
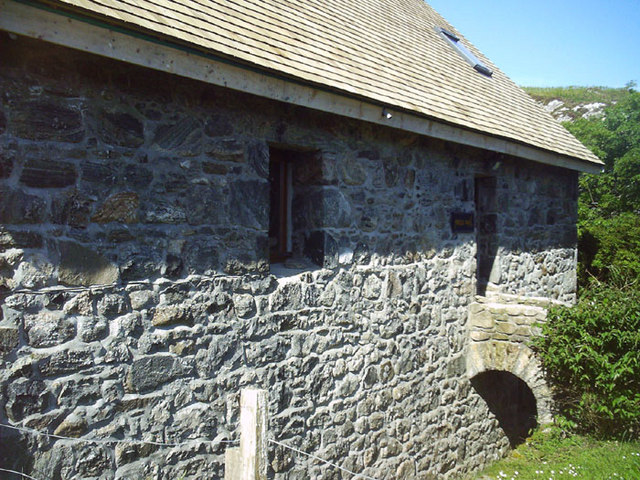
- Acha Mill, a disused and converted watermill

- Location within Argyll and Bute
- OS grid reference: NM1854
- Council area: Argyll and Bute
- Lieutenancy area: Argyll and Bute
- Country: Scotland
- Sovereign state: United Kingdom
- Post town: ISLE OF COLL
- Postcode district: PA78
- Police: Scotland
- Fire: Scottish
- Ambulance: Scottish
- UK Parliament: Argyll, Bute and South Lochaber
- Scottish Parliament: Argyll and Bute

Acha (Scottish Gaelic: An t-Achadh, translating to "The Field") is a small hamlet on the Scottish island of Coll.

== See also ==
- Dùn an Achaidh, a nearby dun
