= Breachacha Castle =

Two related structures on the shore of Loch Breachacha in Scotland

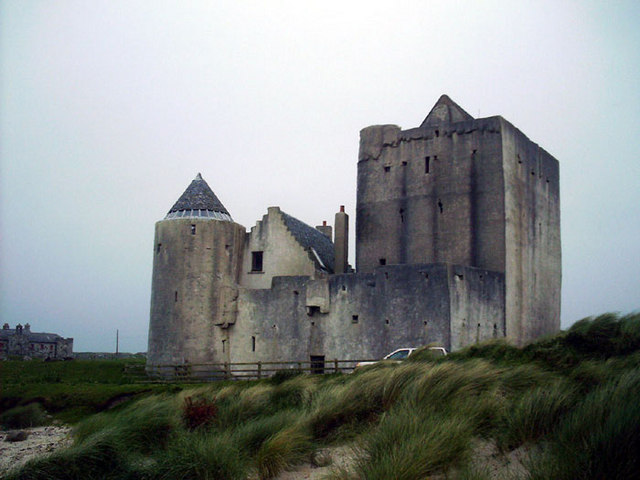
The 15th-century Breachacha Castle

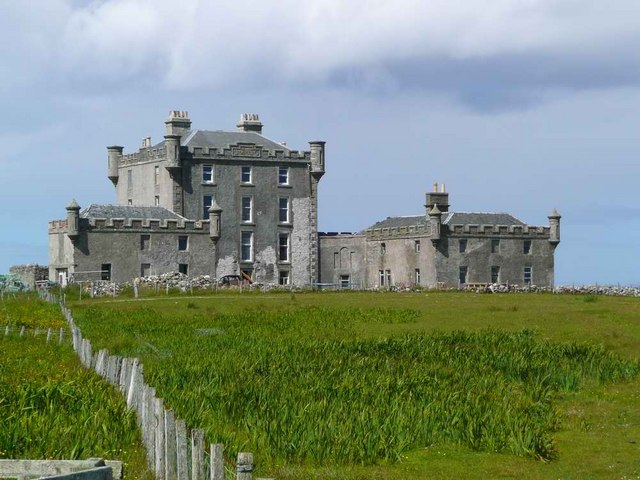
The "new" Breachacha Castle

Breachacha Castle (also spelled Breacachadh) is either of two structures on the shore of Loch Breachacha, on the Inner Hebridean island of Coll, Scotland. The earlier (also called Old Breachacha Castle) is a 15th-century tower house that was a stronghold of the Macleans of Coll, the island having been granted to John Maclean in 1431. This castle was superseded by a new dwelling in 1750 (see below) but continued to be occupied for a time. It fell into a ruinous state only in the mid-19th century.

Work was performed in the 1930s to prevent further dilapidation. A retired Royal Engineer, Brig.-Gen. Ernest Moncrieff Paul (1864–1942), in 1933 obtained permission from Lyon King of Arms to take Stewart of Coll as his surname, and made Breachacha Castle his seat. The castle was restored to livable condition only in the 1960s, by Nicholas MacLean-Bristol and his wife Lavinia. It is a Category A listed building.

The Project Trust had the old castle as their original base until a custom built location on the west of the island was created in 1988.

The newer Breachacha Castle (also known as Breachacha House), which is also a Category A listed building, was constructed in the mid-18th century 140 metres (460 ft) northwest of the old castle (56.5917°N 6.6297°W). Samuel Johnson and James Boswell stayed at the newer castle on their tour of the Hebrides.

As of June 2017 the newer castle is for sale as a listed property in need of great repair.

== Images ==
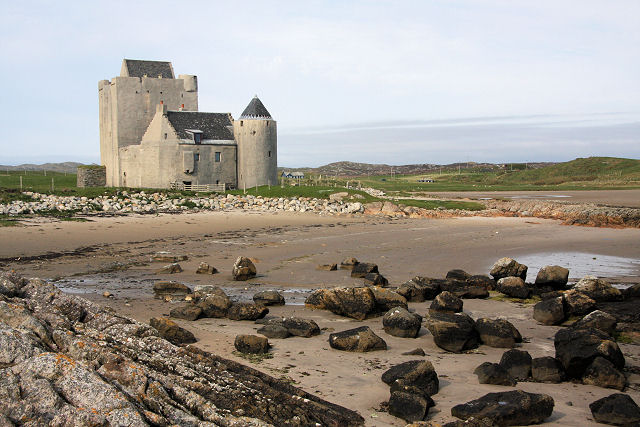
The 15th-century Breachacha Castle
