= Sorisdale =

A small settlement on the Isle of Coll, Scotland

Coordinates: 56.683°N 6.450°W

Sorisdale: Scottish Gaelic: Sòrasdal
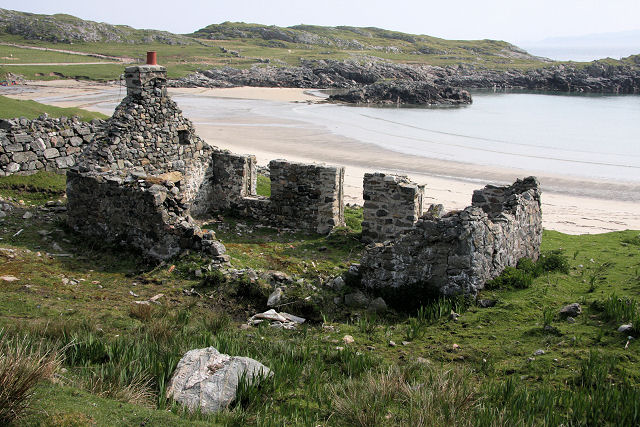

- Location within Argyll and Bute
- OS grid reference: NM 270 632
- Community council: Coll
- Council area: Argyll and Bute
- Lieutenancy area: Argyll and Bute
- Country: Scotland
- Sovereign state: United Kingdom
- Post town: ISLE OF COLL
- Postcode district: PA78
- Dialling code: 01879
- Police: Scotland
- Fire: Scottish
- Ambulance: Scottish
- UK Parliament: Argyll, Bute and South Lochaber
- Scottish Parliament: Argyll and Bute

Sorisdale (Scottish Gaelic: Sòrasdal) is a small, remote settlement on the northern coast of the Isle of Coll, in the council area of Argyll and Bute, Scotland.

== History ==
More than a century ago, it was a thriving community, however, most of Sorisdale now lies abandoned and in ruin, except for a few small, still-occupied homes.

Sorisdale could have been settled as far back as the Mesolithic period.

== Etymology ==
The name Sorisdale originates from the Old Norse words "saurr", meaning mud or silt, and "dalr", meaning a valley or dale.
