= Arinagour =

Village on the Isle of Coll, Scotland

Coordinates: 56.62°N 6.53°W

Arinagour: Scottish Gaelic: Àirigh nan Gobhar
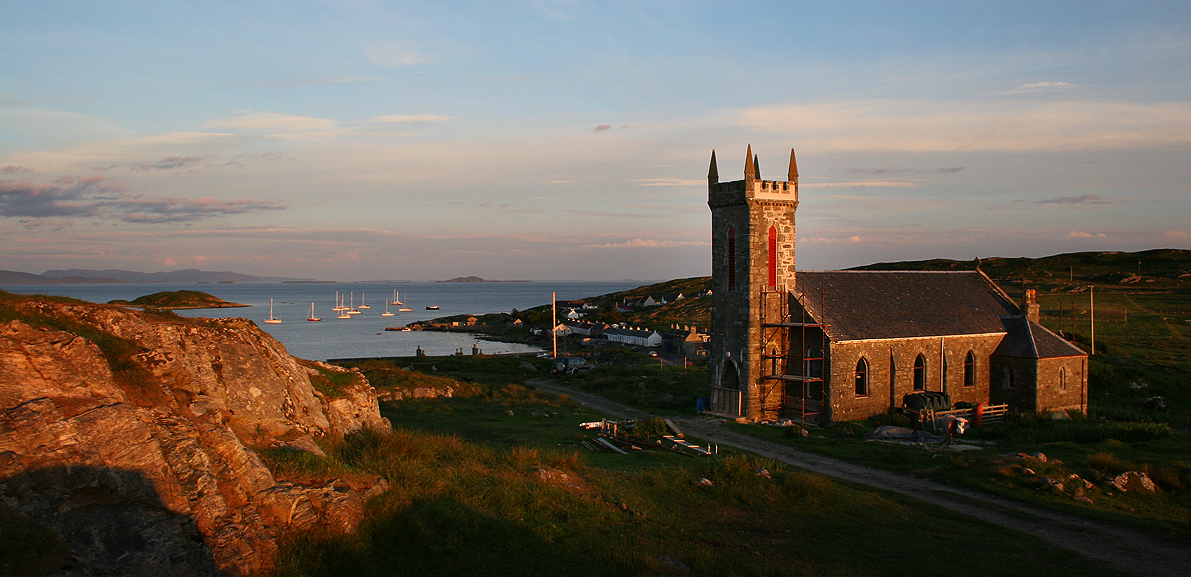
- View over Arinagour and Arinagour Bay

- Location within Argyll and Bute
- Population: 50 (approximate)
- OS grid reference: NM2257
- Council area: Argyll and Bute
- Lieutenancy area: Argyll and Bute
- Country: Scotland
- Sovereign state: United Kingdom
- Post town: ISLE OF COLL
- Postcode district: PA78
- Dialling code: 01879
- Police: Scotland
- Fire: Scottish
- Ambulance: Scottish
- UK Parliament: Argyll, Bute and South Lochaber
- Scottish Parliament: Argyll and Bute

Arinagour (Scottish Gaelic: Àirigh nan Gobhar, "shieling of the goats") is a village on the island of Coll, in the Argyll and Bute council area of Scotland. It is the main settlement on the island, and the location of the island's ferry terminal. It has a population of around 50.

== History ==
Arinagour has been a site of human activity since prehistoric times as evidenced by a standing stone located by the shore.

In 1961 it had a population of 54.

== Buildings ==
Arinagour parish church is a Gothic Revival Church, with a timber roof and lancet windows, that was built in 1907.

Arinagour Free Church was built circa 1880, with a belcote and pointed arch windows it became disused in 2008.

There is a First World War and Second World War memorial in Arinagour, on Shore Street, in the form of a small standing stone with a memorial plaque to those locals who died in the wars.

== Education ==
Arinagour Primary School is located in the village and was built in 1954. In 2022, it was reported as having only 6 pupils.

== Transport ==
Coll's ferry terminal is located on the edge of Arinagour. It is a staffed location, with a pier, vehicle assembly area, passenger facilities and some public moorings. The harbour and pier are also used by leisure craft and small cruise ships.

A ferry operated by Caledonian MacBrayne crosses to Oban and Tiree daily, extending once a week to Castlebay on Barra.
