= John Garbh Maclean, 1st Laird of Coll =

John Garbh Maclean, was the 1st Laird of Coll as an independent unit.

== Biography ==
John was the second son of Lachlan Bronneach Maclean and Fionnaghal, daughter of Sìol Tormoid (Note: also known as the MacLeods of Harris) leader. Fionnaghal was Lachlan's second wife, making John Garbh the third lawful son of Lachlan, and the fourth (and youngest) natural son. Lachlan was the leader of the MacLeans, and his eldest lawful son, Donald MacLean, was his heir.

When John grew into an adult, he gained the sobriquet Garbh, meaning rough, in reference to his gigantic stature and great strength. He was also called John Teomachd, from his cunning and craft.

John's father, Lachlan, was also the grandson of Mary MacDonald, daughter of John of Islay; John's grandfather was thus the cousin of Alexander, the current Lord of the Isles, whose vassals the Macleans were.

Donald MacLean took an armed band to Ardtornish, Alexander's main castle, and demanded a share of the estates Alexander had inherited from John of Islay, on the basis of common descent. After satisfying Alexander's demand that Donald expel the MacMasters (Note: the MacMasters of Ardgour were a small, and somewhat obscure, group among Alexander's vassals, descended from William, a priest who acquired an M.A. in 1400. They are distinct from the similarly named MacMasters of Kintail, who are a branch of the Buchanans. The MacMasters of Ardgour had entered into a confederation with the MacInnes (in a similar manner to the Chattan Confederation).) (with whom Alexander had fallen out) from Ardgour (Note: the MacMasters subsequently allied with Clan Cameron), Alexander awarded him a charter for Ardgour, and other adjacent lands, which were subsequently confirmed by King James I. Having noticed this, John Garbh decided to try his luck by challenging Alexander in the same way as Donald had; Alexander gave him a charter for:

- Coll (comprising 20 poundlands)
- Quinish (comprising 18 merklands), in Mull
- Loch Eil (comprising 20 poundlands), in Lochaber
- Drimnin and Achalennon (together comprising 6 merklands), in Morvern

King James II confirmed Alexander's grant to John. Afterwards, John claimed purchased the island of Rùm (with the associated islands of Canna and Muck) from Allan MacDonald, leader of Clan Ranald (Note: great-grandson of the founder, Ranald); the price was a galley. However, Clan Ranald refused to acknowledge the sale (Note: According to legend, though the galley provided by John looked in good quality, the interior was rotten); John Garbh consequently seized Allan MacDonald, and held him prisoner on Coll. After 9 months, Allan was released, presumably having agreed to acknowledge a sale; following this, records describe Rùm (with Canna and Muck) as pertaining to John Garbh's descendants, rather than to Clan Ranald.

John Garbh lived feared by his enemies and respected by his friends. He married Isabella, daughter of Fraser of Lovat, predecessor of Lord Lovat. He was succeeded in his estates by his only son, John Abrach MacLean, 2nd Laird of Coll.
