= Coll =

Island and parish in Scotland

Cola (Gaelic)
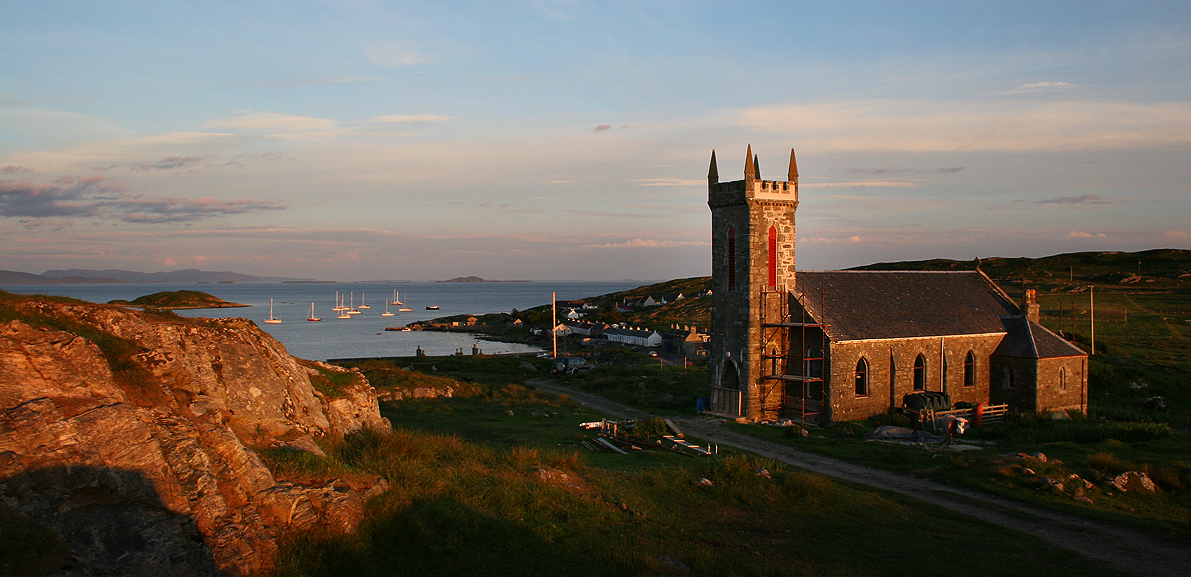
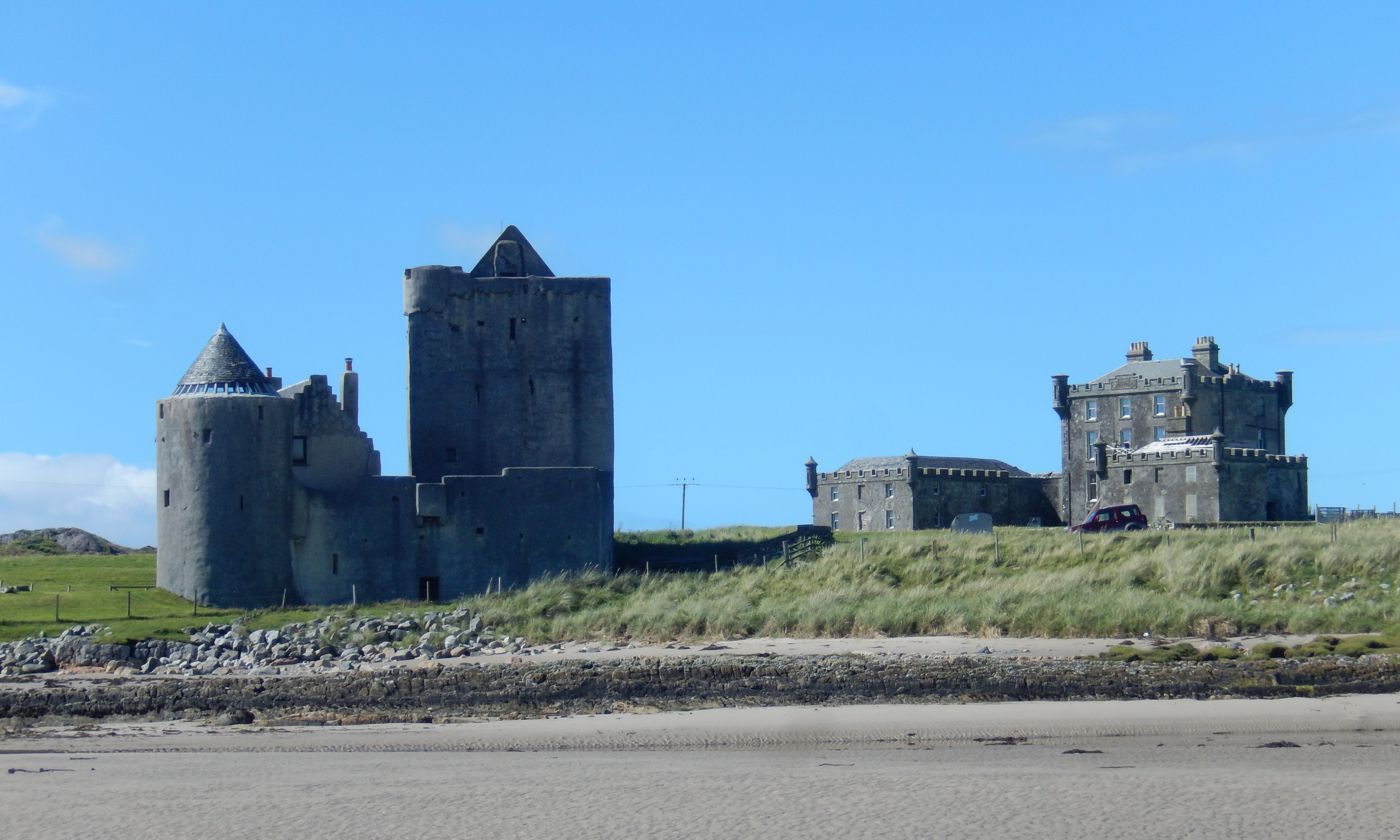
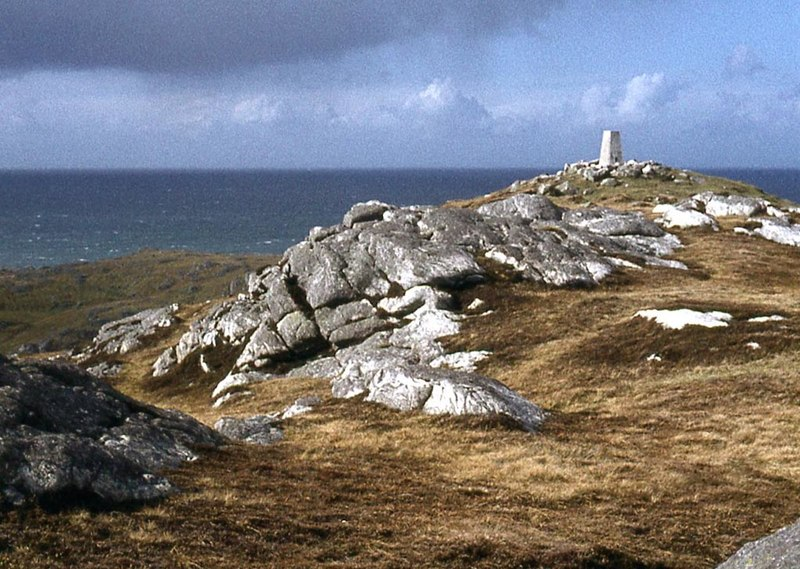
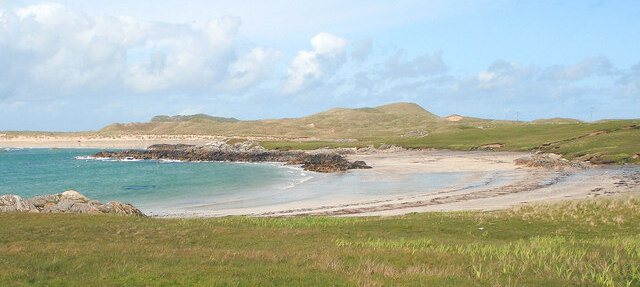
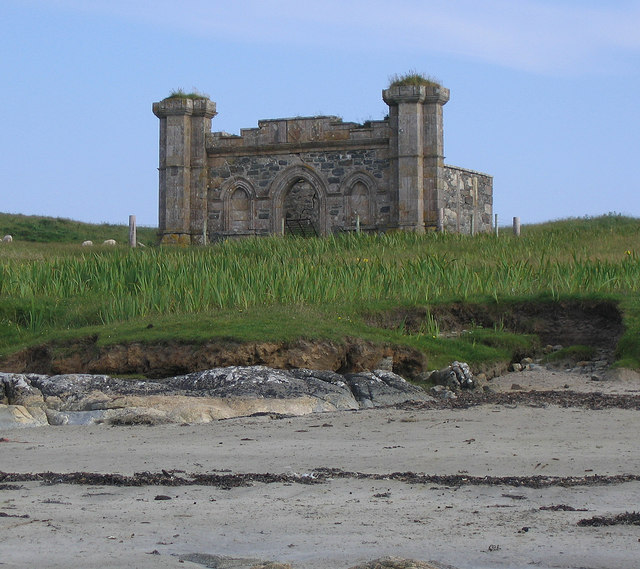
- The main village of Arinagour Breachacha Castles Top of Ben Hogh Tràigh Sgaisteil Maclean's Tomb

Location
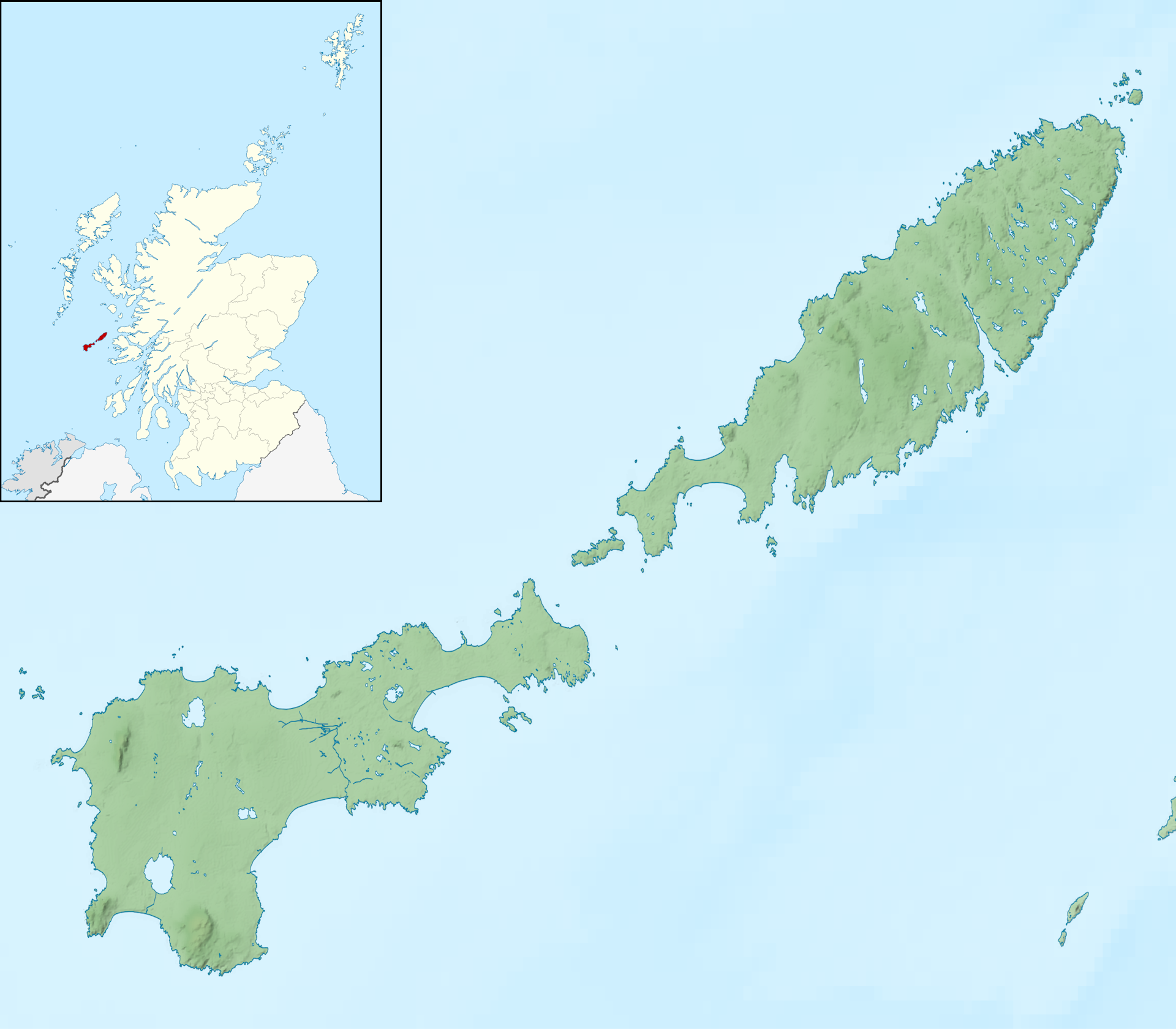
- Coll shown next to Tiree Coll within Argyll and Bute Coll within Scotland
- OS grid reference: NM207584
- Coordinates: 56.64°N 6.55°W

Name
- Gaelic pronunciation: [ˈkʰɔl̪ˠə]
- Name meaning: Pre-Celtic and unclear

Physical geography
- Island group: Mull
- Area: 7,685 ha (29 5/8 sq mi)
- Area rank: 18
- Highest elevation: Ben Hogh 106 m (348 ft)

Administration
- Council area: Argyll and Bute
- Country: Scotland
- Sovereign state: United Kingdom

Demographics
- Population: 176
- Population rank: 37
- Population density: 2.3/km^{2} (6.0/sq mi)
- Largest settlement: Arinagour

Ramsar Wetland
- Designated: 31 March 1995
- Reference no.: 723

Coll (Note: /ˈkɒl/; Scottish Gaelic: Cola) is an island located west of the Isle of Mull and northeast of Tiree in the Inner Hebrides of Scotland. Coll is known for its sandy beaches, which rise to form large sand dunes, for its corncrakes, and for Breacachadh Castle. It is in the council area of Argyll and Bute. Arinagour is the main settlement on Coll. There is a ferry terminal on the island which connects it with the mainland of Scotland. Coll also has a small airport. The island is rural in nature and has been awarded Dark Sky status.

== Geology ==
Coll is formed largely from gneiss forming the Lewisian complex, a suite of metamorphic rocks of Archaean to early Proterozoic age. The eastern part of the island is traversed by numerous normal faults most of which run broadly northwest–southeast. Dolerite and camptonite dykes of Permo-Carboniferous or Tertiary age are also seen in the east of the island. Quaternary sediments include raised beach deposits which are frequent around Coll's coastline whilst stretches of alluvium occupy some low inland areas. There are considerable areas of blown sand in the west and along stretches of the north coast and of peat southwest from Arinagour.

== Geography ==
Coll is about 13 miles (21 kilometres) long by 3 miles (5 kilometres) wide. It had a population of 176 according to the 2022 Census. This was a decline from 195 in 2011. Coll's sandy beaches rise to form large sand dunes. The highest point on Coll is Ben Hogh in the mid-west of the island, which is a ridge with two tops running northwest to southeast. It rises initially to a height of 104 metres (341 feet), with a triangulation pillar, and to 106 m (348 ft) 450 m (490 yd) to the southeast.

=== Settlements ===
Arinagour (Scottish Gaelic: Àirigh nan Gobhar), is the main settlement on the island located at the head of Loch Eatharna, on the east coast. Other inhabited locations include:

- Acha (Scottish Gaelic: An t-Achadh), a crofting settlement located 5 km (3 mi) south-west of Arinagour.
- Arileod (Scottish Gaelic: Àirigh Leòid), located on the west coast; 7 km (4 1/2 mi) south-west of Arinagour.
- Arnabost (Scottish Gaelic: Àrnabost), located 3 km (2 mi) north-west of Arinagour. it is the junction for travel between Sorisdale, Clabhach and Arinagour.
- Ballyhaugh (Scottish Gaelic: Baile Hogh), located on the northern part of Hough Bay; 5 km (3 mi) west of Arinagour.
- Bousd (Scottish Gaelic: Babhsta), located 7 km (4 1/2 mi) north-east of Arinagour.
- Clabhach (Scottish Gaelic: A' Chlabaich), located on the north-west coast; 5 km (3 mi) north-west of Arinagour.
- Cornaigmore
- Crossapol (Scottish Gaelic: Crosabol), located on the south-west coast.
- Grishipoll
- Sorisdale
- Totronald (Scottish Gaelic: Tobhta Raghnaill), located on the west coast 7 km (4 1/2 mi) southwest of Arinagour.
- Uig (Scottish Gaelic: Ùig), located 1 km (1/2 mi) north-east of the head of Loch Breachacha.

== Etymology ==
It has been suggested that Coll is derived from Gaelic coll, meaning 'hazel'. However, the name is given as Colosus in the Life of St Columba by Adamnán, the seventh century abbot of Iona. As /s/ between vowels had been lost in Celtic before Adamnán's time, Watson suggests that Colosus may represent a pre-Celtic name. Richard Coates has proposed that the name may be related to Greek kolossós and may have referred to a humanoid standing stone located on the island, like those still seen on North Uist and Lewis. As Kolossós is not originally a Greek word, Coates suggests that the name could have been given to Coll at a time when the kolossói of Mediterranean culture were well-known, or named "by speakers of a language in which the ancestor of the word was the native term." In Icelandic, the word kollur (Old Norse: kollr, Norwegian: koll or kolle) means "a rounded protrusion, such as a rounded mountaintop, or a tussock".

== History ==
=== Early history ===
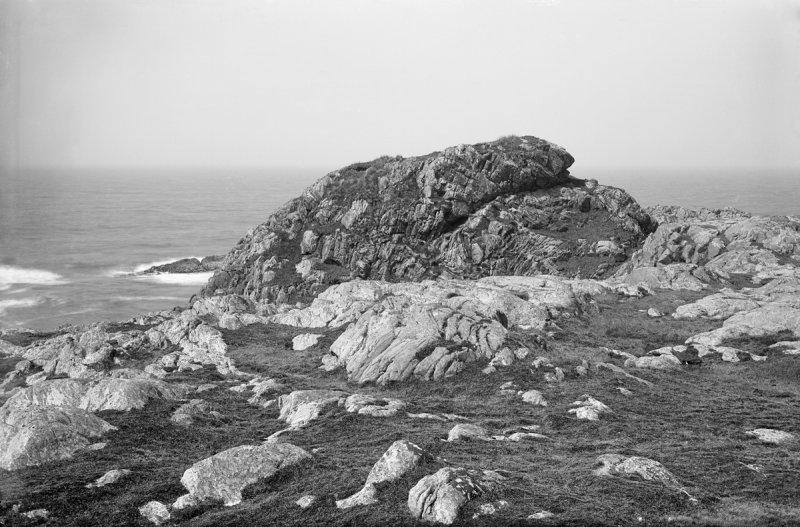
Dùn Beic (in about 1900), one of several Dùn on Coll traditionally claimed to have been Norse strongholds.

In the 6th century, an Irish invasion led to the establishment of the Gaelic kingdom of Dál Riata, which included Coll. Dál Riata was divided into four kin-groups, of which the Cenél Loairn ruled Coll, Mull, and the adjacent mainland, which together consequently became known as Lorn, after them. Coll shared the history of Lorn for the next 1000 years, becoming part of the Kingdom of the Isles under Norwegian dominion, then the MacDougall subdivision of that kingdom after Somerled.

Coll, like other Hebridean islands, has several crannógs (artificial islands) located in some of its lochs, dating from this early period. It is difficult to estimate the exact age of these islands, but several are thought to date to the Norse period; local traditions describe three – Dùn Anlaimh, Dùn an Achaidh, Dùn Dubh – as having been Norse strongholds which survived until they were attacked by the Macleans.

The 1266 Treaty of Perth transferred the Norwegian crown dependency to the Scottish king (Note: rather than Scotland; they remained a crown dependency, like the Isle of Man (which had itself once been part of the Kingdom of the Isles)). Following the MacDougall defeat in the dispute between king John Balliol and Robert de Bruys (they had backed the former), the position of sheriff of Argyll was created to have shrieval authority over Lorn (Note: Over Lorn only. Authority was only extended to the rest of the region now known as Argyll by a gradual process over the following centuries. Kintyre, for example, was dealt with by the sheriff of Tarbert for many centuries after this.), and the MacDougall lands were merged into the Lordship of the Isles. Though MacDougall authority was restored in 1357, by king David II, the MacDougall heir had 3 years previously (Note: 1354), quitclaimed any rights to Mull (including Coll), which therefore remained with the Lord of the Isles.

In 1549 Dean Monro wrote of Coll that it was:

"ane mane fertile Ile inhabite and manurit, with an castell and ane paroch kirk in it, gude for fishing and fowlers, with ane utter fine Falcons nest in it".

He wrote of Rum:

"It pertains to McKenabrey of Coll".

In the 15th century, the island came under the ownership of the MacLeans of Coll who constructed Breachacha Castle. The MacLeans exercised baronial control of the island until 1848. The Maclean ownership of the castle was sold in 1851.

=== Departure ===
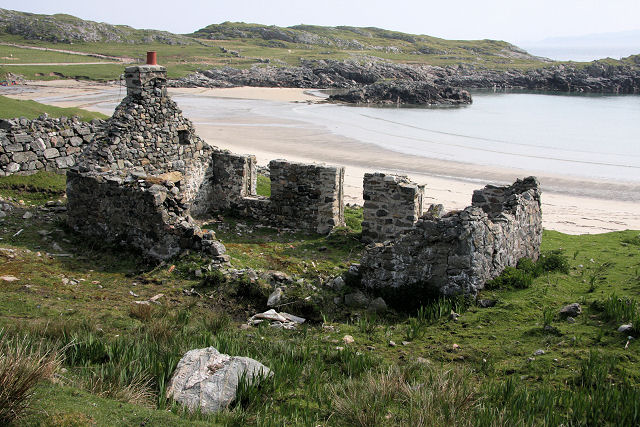
Derelict house at Sorisdale

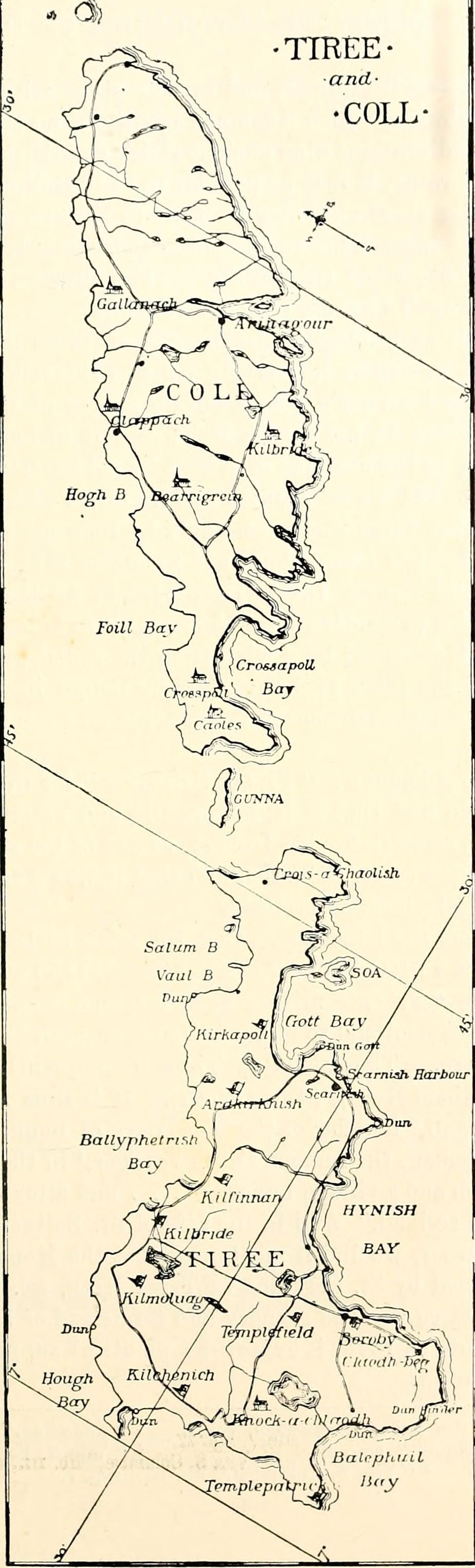
Map of Tiree (bottom, southwest) and Coll (top, northeast), 1899.

In the late 18th century there were about 1,000 people supported by agriculture and fishing. However, the collapse in the kelp market after the end of the Napoleonic Wars, followed by the Highland Potato Famine, caused a great deal of hardship on the island. By the mid 19th century, much of the population had chosen to leave, many of them moving to Australia, Canada, or South Africa in a process referred to as the Scottish diaspora. One source indicates that 23% of the island's population relocated. The process took place alongside the clearances where many were removed from their land. In Coll, overpopulation was cited as a factor.

=== Fishing ===
The Annual Reports of the Fishery Board for Scotland provide an insight into fishing from Coll in the years before the First World War. It is interesting to note that 1897 "three East Coast boats fished cod and ling in the spring".

Fishery Statistics

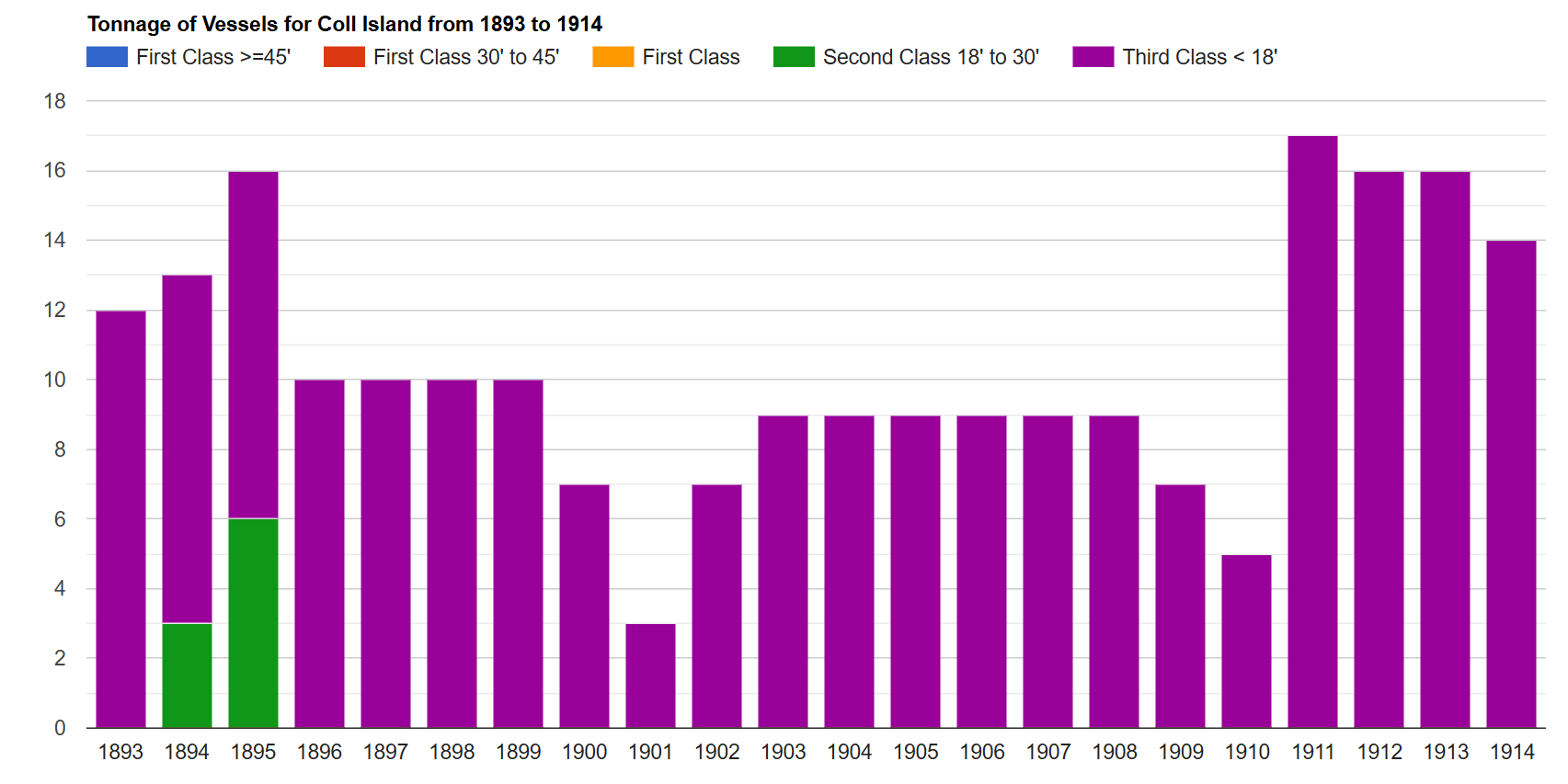
Tonnage of vessels

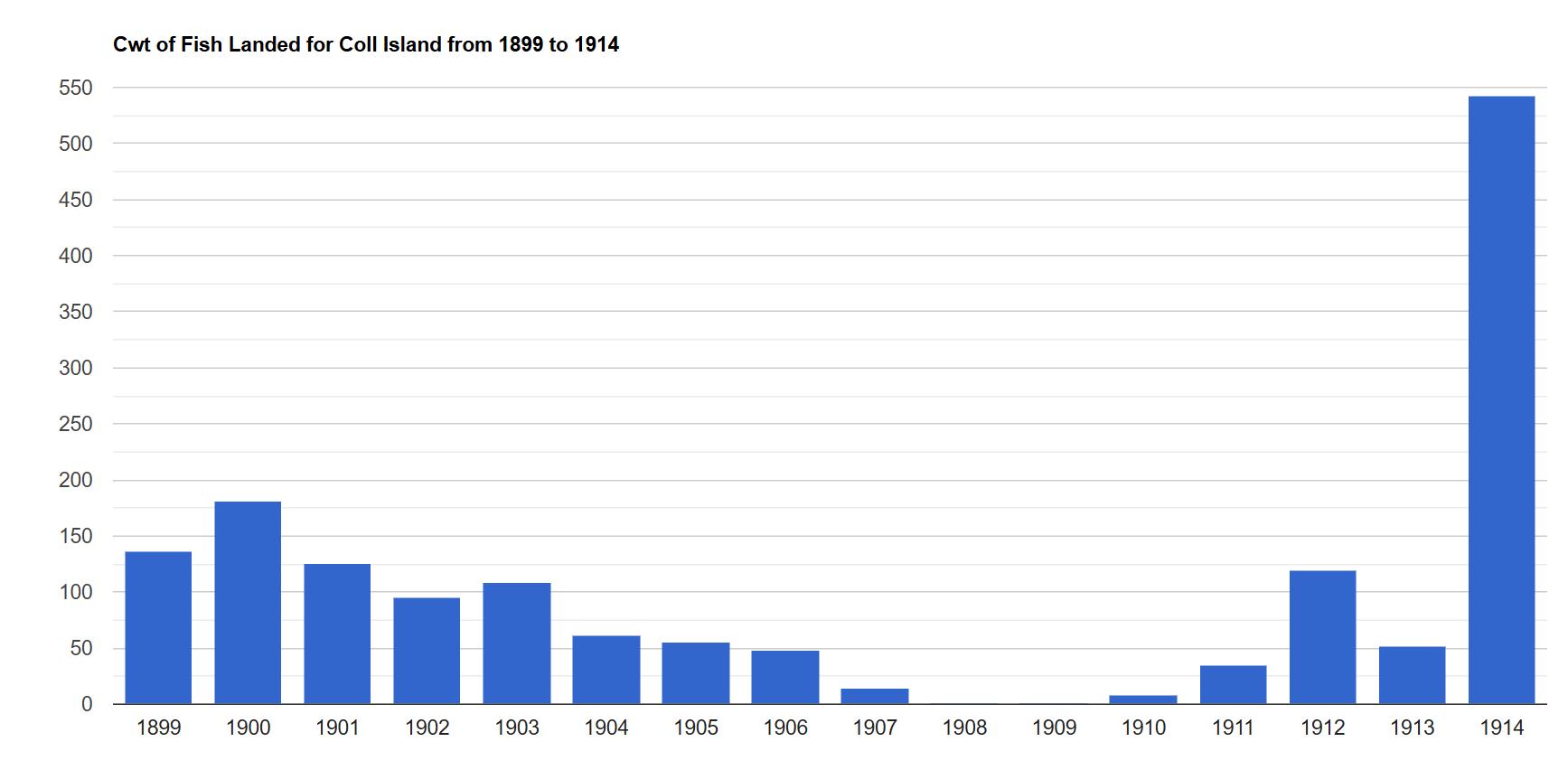
Cwt of fish landed

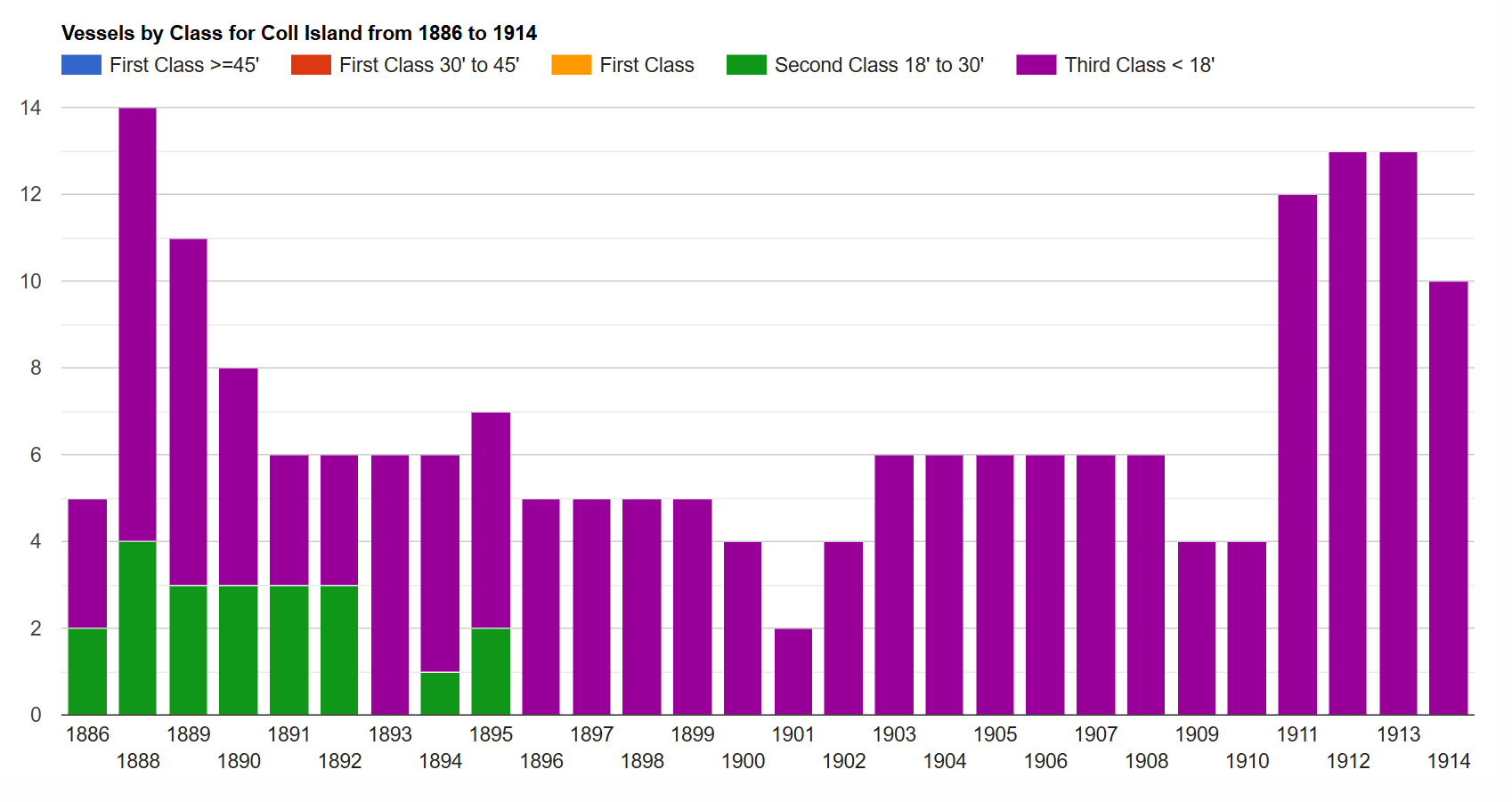
Vessels by class

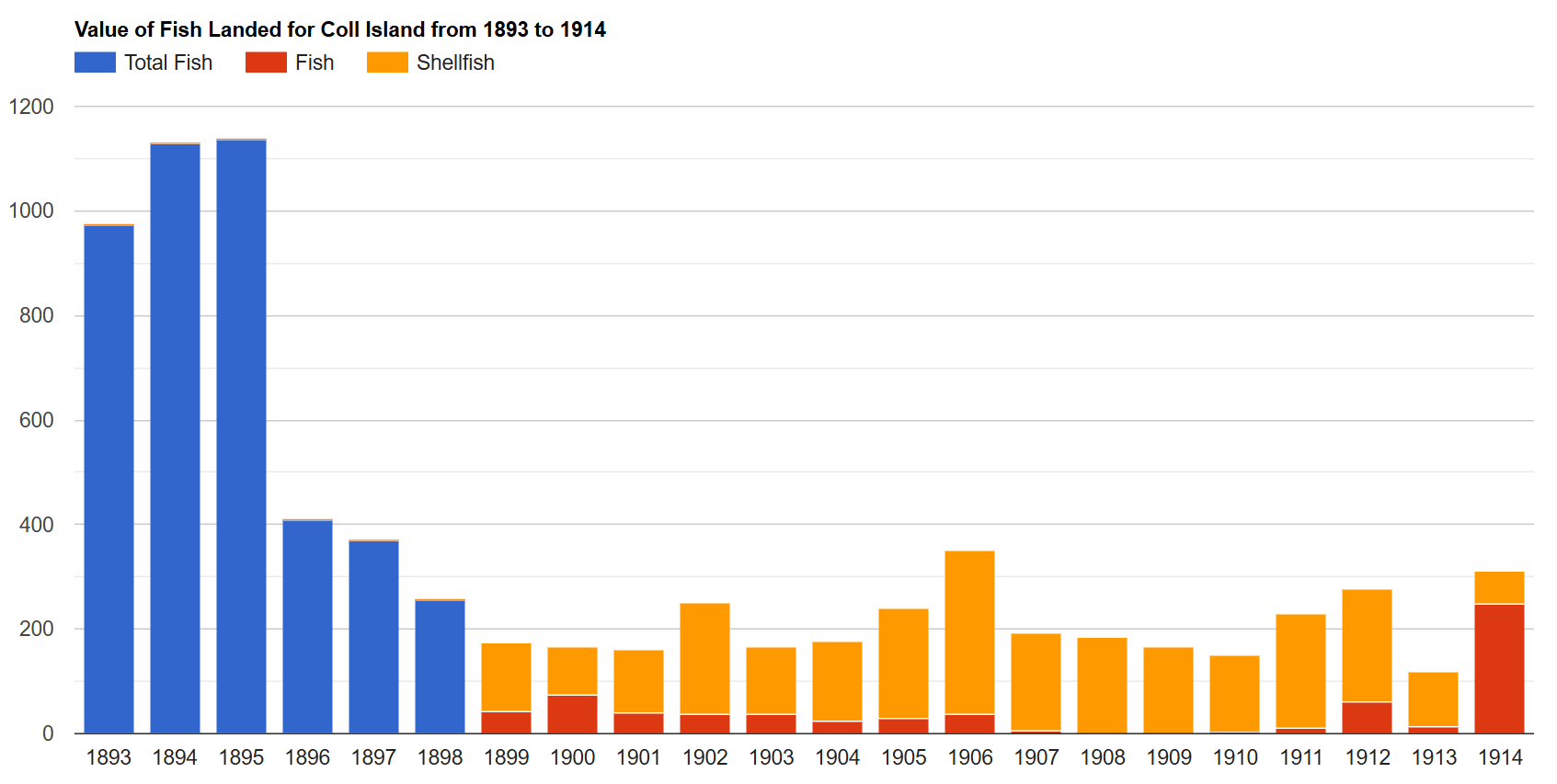
Value (£) of fish landed

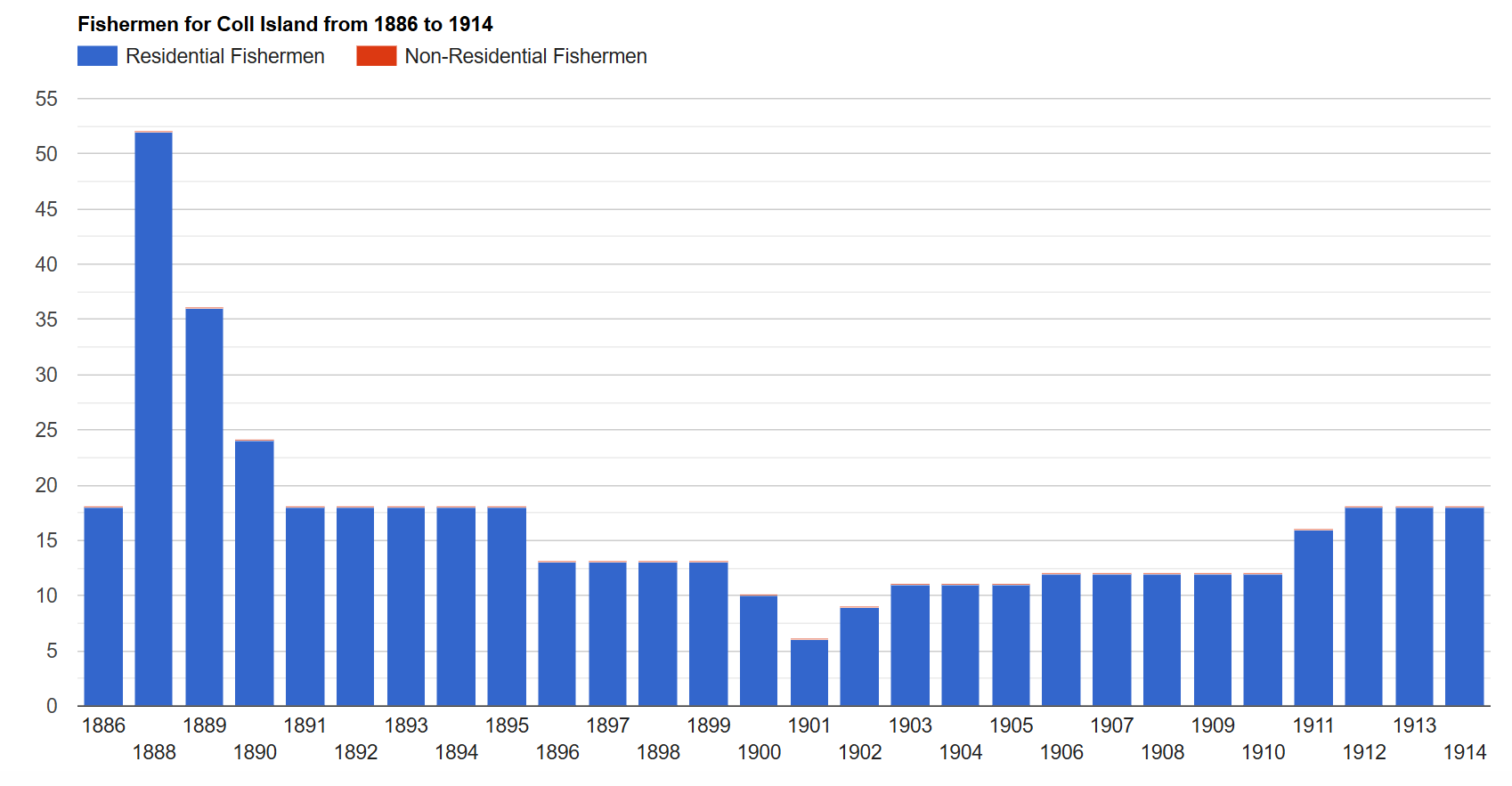
Fishermen

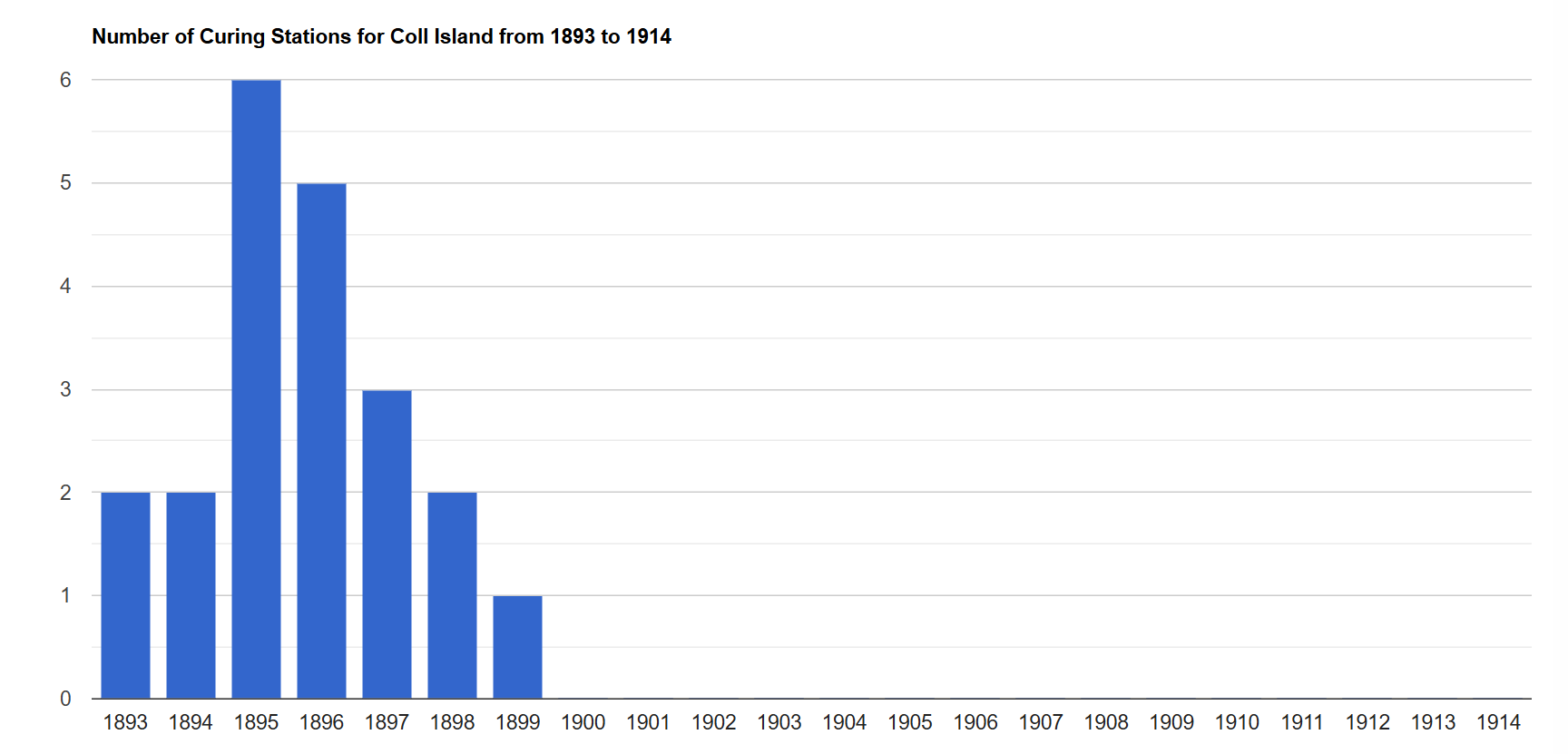
Number of curing stations

=== Present day ===
In the 2011 census, the island's population was recorded as 195, representing an increase over the previous decade of nearly 19% During the same period Scottish island populations as a whole grew by 4% (to 103,702).

In December 2013, Coll secured 'dark skies' status, the second location in Scotland. The island has no street lights and little other light pollution, allowing unobstructed views of the night sky on clear nights. In winter the Northern Lights are often visible.

In January 2024, Coll experienced a 3.3 magnitude earthquake according to the British Geological Survey.

== Transport ==
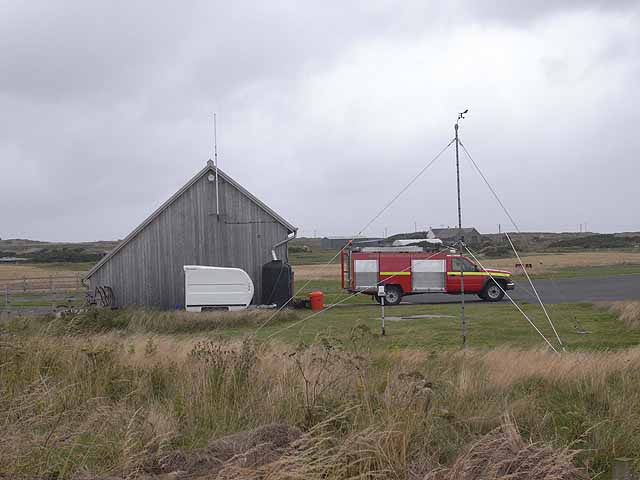
Coll airport

There are only two main roads on Coll. The main hub of the island is the island's largest settlement, Arinagour. Just over a kilometre (0.7 miles) south of Arinagour is the Caledonian MacBrayne ferry terminal. The ferry travels from Oban to Coll to Tiree; and a return trip from Tiree, to Coll, to Oban. The ferry between Oban and Castlebay on Barra goes via Coll and Tiree once a week.

The airport on the island, (IATA: COL) is located between Uig and Arileod. Highland Airways who originally operated the route to Oban went into administration in 2010, but a new operator, Hebridean Air Services now operates the route under a PSO with flights to Oban, Tiree and Colonsay. The aircraft used for the flights are a BN2 Islander (G-HEBS). Hebridean headquarters are at Cumbernauld Airport, North Lanarkshire.

Preceding station	Ferry	Following station
Tiree	Caledonian MacBrayne; Ferry	Oban

== Economy ==
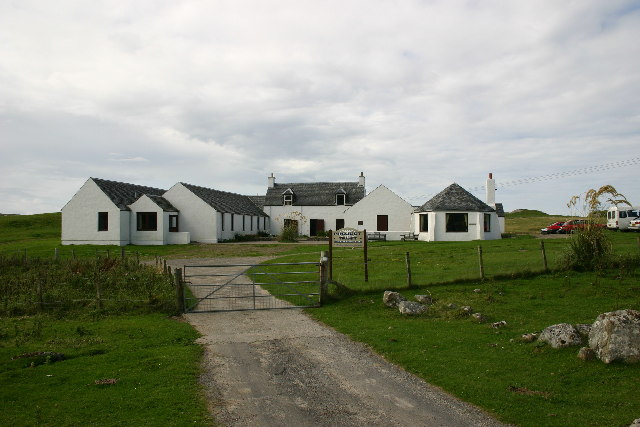
Project Trust centre

Agriculture, primarily land owned farming as opposed to crofting is one of the major employment areas on the island. There are also a few fishing vessels that operate from the island.

The Isle of Coll's community centre, An Cridhe, and hostel, Coll Bunkhouse was opened in July 2012 by Princess Anne. Owned and managed by the community-led organisation Development Coll, the new facilities were built to provide much needed amenities on the island and a social hub for the local community. An Cridhe now hosts a series of annual events such as a half marathon, the Coll Show, a basking shark festival, a bird festival and a chamber music festival, as well as a range of music, comedy, theatre and dance throughout the year. The centre also has a film club, Screen Coll. A remote outdoor disco is also held on the island.

In September 2024, it was reported that the island had one shop, one restaurant, one hotel and a post office in operation.

The charity Project Trust, which organises overseas volunteering and gap-years, has been based on the island since 1974. The founder, Nicholas Maclean-Bristol, also restored Breacachadh Castle. The island also has several tourist businesses.

== Wildlife ==
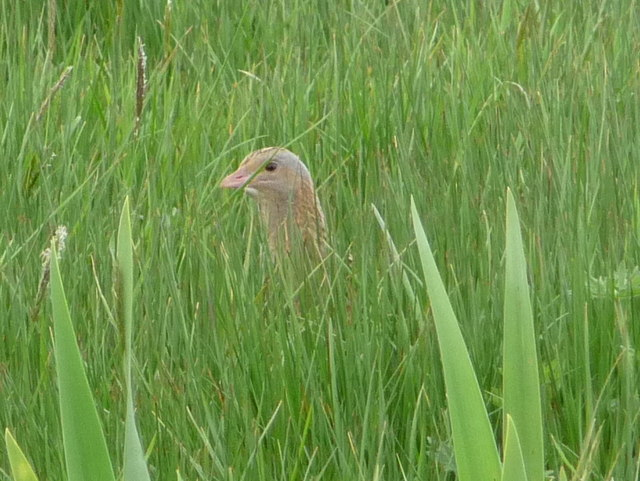
A corncrake, near Arnabost

There is an extensive RSPB reserve towards the west end of the island. One of the main attractions is the rare corncrake, as well as Skylarks. Traditional local farming practices have helped this once common British bird to survive.

In the 1970s, scientists released sand lizards on Coll. There is also a small population of sand lizards, as many as 39 individuals were introduced by scientists to test whether they can survive so far north in the 1970s and are still thriving today.

In 2010, a colony of short-necked oil beetles was found on the island. The beetle, thought to be extinct in the UK, is now known only to occur in southern England and Coll. It is parasitic on ground-dwelling bees, and is also flightless, raising the question of how it arrived on the island. It does not appear to be found on neighbouring Tiree, possibly because of a difference in terrain. Modern farming methods had partly caused its demise elsewhere.

== In fiction ==
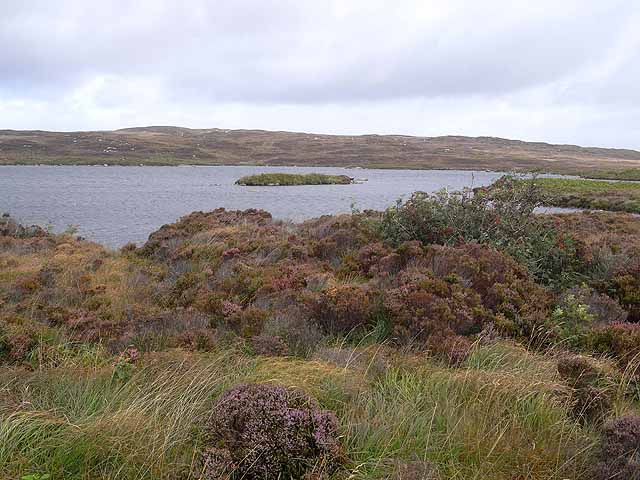
Island on Loch Ronard, one of the many lochans and lochs on Coll. In the foreground, heather and a rowan tree.

Mairi Hedderwick, the illustrator and author, used to live on Coll and has used the island as the setting for her Katie Morag series of children's books. In the books, Coll is known by the fictional name of the Isle of Struay.

In Alexander McCall Smith's The Charming Quirks of Others the protagonist, Isabelle Dalhousie, discusses Coll as a place for a honeymoon.

== See also ==
- List of islands of Scotland
- List of Sites of Special Scientific Interest in Mull, Coll and Tiree
- Cairns of Coll
- Land raid
- Religion of the Yellow Stick

== Bibliography ==
- Haswell-Smith, Hamish (2004). The Scottish Islands. Edinburgh: Canongate. ISBN 978-1-84195-454-7.
- Mac an Tàilleir, Iain (2003) Goireasan Cànain / Language Resources - Tadhail is Ionnsaich : Pàrlamaid na h-Alba. (pdf) Pàrlamaid na h-Alba. Retrieved 26 October 2025.
- Munro, R. W. (1961) Electronic Monro's Western Isles of Scotland and Genealogies of the Clans. Edinburgh and London. Oliver and Boyd.
- Watson, W. J. (1994) The Celtic Place-Names of Scotland. Edinburgh; Birlinn. ISBN 1841583235. First published 1926.
