= Crannog =

Prehistoric lake dwelling

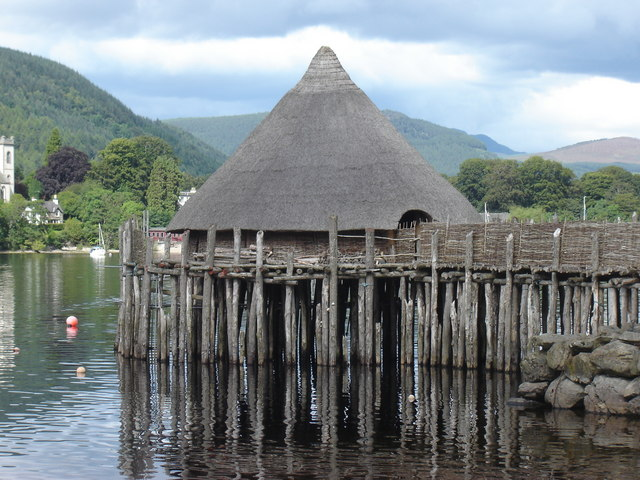
A reconstructed crannog near Kenmore, Perth and Kinross, on Loch Tay, Scotland

A crannog (/ˈkrænəɡ/; Irish: crannóg [ˈkɾˠan̪ˠoːɡ]; Scottish Gaelic: crannag [ˈkʰɾan̪ˠak]) is typically a partially or entirely artificial island, usually constructed in lochs, lakes, bogs and estuarine waters of Ireland and Scotland. Unlike the prehistoric pile dwellings around the Alps, which were built on shores and not inundated until later, crannogs were built in the water, thus forming artificial islands.

Humans have inhabited crannogs over five millennia, from the European Neolithic Period to as late as the 17th/early-18th centuries. In Scotland there is no convincing evidence in the archaeological record of their use in the Early or Middle Bronze Age or in the Norse period; Loch Bhorgastail crannog and Eilean Dòmhnuill crannog are considered one of the oldest, dating to 3380–3630 BC and 3650 to 2500 respectively.

The radiocarbon dating obtained from other sites such as Oakbank and Redcastle indicates at a 95.4 per cent confidence level that they date to the Late Bronze Age to Early Iron Age, after 800 BC.

Some crannogs apparently involved free-standing wooden structures, as at Loch Tay, although more commonly they are composed of brush, stone or timber mounds that can be revetted with timber piles. In areas such as the Outer Hebrides of Scotland, timber was unavailable from the Neolithic era onwards. As a result, crannogs made completely of stone and supporting drystone architecture are common there.

== Etymology and uncertain meanings ==
The Irish word crannóg derives from Old Irish crannóc, which referred to a wooden structure or vessel, stemming from crann, which means "tree", suffixed with "-óg" which is a diminutive ending ultimately borrowed from Welsh. The suffix -óg is sometimes misunderstood by non-native Irish-speakers as óg, which is a separate word that means "young". This misunderstanding leads to a folk etymology whereby crannóg is misanalysed as crann óg, which is pronounced differently and means "a young tree". The modern sense of the term first appears sometime around the 12th century; its popularity spread in the medieval period along with the terms isle, ylle, inis, eilean or oileán.

There is some confusion on what the term crannog originally referred to, as the structure atop the island or the island itself. The additional meanings of Irish crannóg can be variously related as 'structure/piece of wood', including 'crow's nest', 'pulpit', or 'driver's box on a coach'; 'vessel/box/chest' more generally; and 'wooden pin'. The Scottish Gaelic form is crannag and has the additional meanings of 'pulpit' and 'churn'. Thus, there is no real consensus on what the term crannog actually implies, although the modern adoption in the English language broadly refers to a partially or completely artificial islet that saw use from the prehistoric to the Post-Medieval period in Ireland and Scotland.

== Location ==
Crannogs are widespread in Ireland, with an estimated 1,200 examples, while Scotland has 389 sites officially listed as such. The actual number in Scotland varies considerably depending on definition—between about 350 and 500, due to the use of the term "island dun" for well over one hundred Hebridean examples—a distinction that has created a divide between mainland Scottish crannog and Hebridean islet settlement studies. Previously unknown crannogs in Scotland and Ireland are still being found as underwater surveys continue to investigate loch beds for completely submerged examples.

The largest concentrations of crannogs in Ireland are found in the Drumlin Belt of the Midlands, North and Northwest. In Scotland, crannogs are mostly found on the western coast, with high concentrations in Argyll and Dumfries and Galloway. In reality, the Western Isles contain the highest density of lake-settlements in Scotland, yet they are recognised under varying terms besides "crannog". One lone Welsh example exists at Llangorse Lake, probably a product of Irish influence.

In Ireland, crannogs were most prevalent in Connacht and Ulster; where they were built on bogs and small lakes such as Lough Conn and Lough Gara, while being less frequent on larger lakes such as Lough Erne, or rivers such as the Shannon. Today, crannogs typically appear as small, circular islets, often 8–25 metres (30–80 ft) in diameter, covered in dense vegetation due to their inaccessibility to grazing livestock. Reconstructed Irish crannógs are located at Craggaunowen, County Clare, in the Irish National Heritage Park, County Wexford and at Castle Espie, County Down. In Scotland there are reconstructions at the "Scottish Crannog Centre" at Loch Tay, Perthshire; this centre offers guided tours and hands-on activities, including wool-spinning, wood-turning and making fire, holds events to celebrate wild cooking and crafts, and hosts yearly Midsummer, Lughnasadh and Samhain festivals.

== Types and problems with definition ==
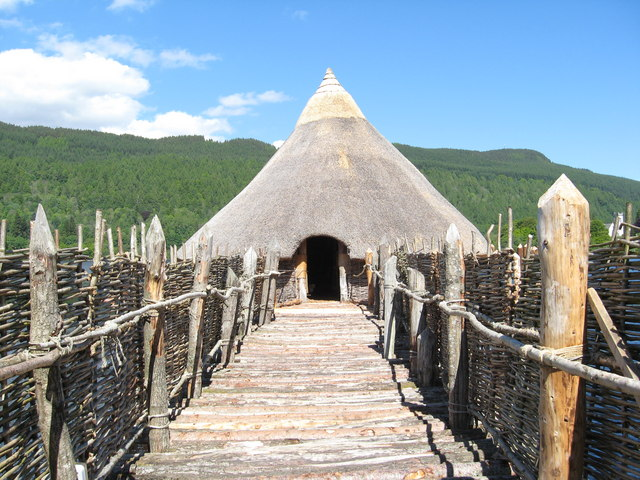
A replica crannóg on Loch Tay

Crannogs took on many different forms and methods of construction based on what was available in the immediate landscape. The classic image of a prehistoric crannog stems from both post-medieval illustrations and highly influential excavations, such as Milton Loch in Scotland by C. M. Piggot after World War II. The Milton Loch interpretation is of a small islet surrounded or defined at its edges by timber piles and a gangway, topped by a typical Iron Age roundhouse.

The choice of a small islet as a home may seem odd today, yet waterways were the main channels for both communication and travel until the 19th century in much of Ireland and, especially, Highland Scotland. Crannogs are traditionally interpreted as simple prehistorical farmsteads. They are also interpreted as boltholes in times of danger, as status symbols with limited access, and as inherited locations of power that imply a sense of legitimacy and ancestry towards ownership of the surrounding landscape.

A strict definition of a crannog, which has long been debated, requires the use of timber. Sites in the Western Isles do not satisfy this criterion, although their inhabitants shared the common habit of living on water. If not classed as "true" crannogs, small occupied islets (often at least partially artificial in nature) may be referred to as "island duns". Rather confusingly, 22 islet-based sites are classified as "proper" crannogs due to differing interpretations of inspectors or excavators who drew up field reports.

Hebridean island dwellings or crannogs were commonly built on both natural and artificial islets, usually reached by a stone causeway. The visible structural remains are traditionally interpreted as duns or, in more recent terminology, as "Atlantic roundhouses". This terminology has recently become popular when describing the entire range of robust, drystone structures that existed in later prehistoric Atlantic Scotland.

The majority of crannog excavations were, by modern standards, poorly conducted in the late 19th and early 20th centuries by early antiquarians, or were purely accidental finds as lochs were drained during the improvements to increase usable farmland or pasture. In some early digs, labourers hauled away tons of materials, with little regard to anything that was not of immediate economic value. Conversely, the vast majority of early attempts at proper excavation failed to accurately measure or record stratigraphy, thereby failing to provide a secure context for artefact finds. Thus only extremely limited interpretations are possible. Preservation and conservation techniques for waterlogged materials such as logboats or structural material were all but non-existent, and a number of extremely important finds were destroyed as a result; in some instances, they were even dried out for firewood.

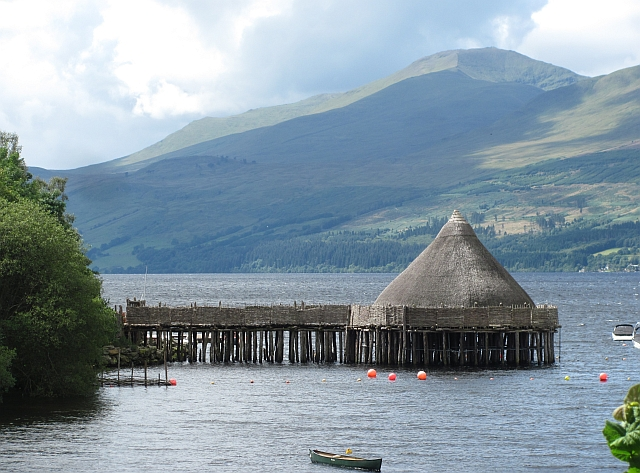
Reconstructed crannog

From about 1900 to the late 1940s there was very little crannog excavation in Scotland, while some important and highly influential contributions were made in Ireland. In contrast, relatively few crannogs have been excavated since the Second World War. This number has steadily grown, especially since the early 1980s, and may soon surpass prewar totals. The overwhelming majority of crannogs show multiple phases of occupation and re-use, often extending over centuries. Thus the re-occupiers may have viewed crannogs as a legacy that was alive in local tradition and memory.

Crannog reoccupation is important and significant, especially in the many instances of crannogs built near natural islets, which were often completely unused. This long chronology of use has been verified by both radiocarbon dating and more precisely by dendrochronology.

Interpretations of crannog function have not been static; instead they appear to have changed in both the archaeological and historic records. Rather than the simple domestic residences of prehistory, the medieval crannogs were increasingly seen as strongholds of the upper class or regional political players, such as the Gaelic chieftains of the O'Boylans and McMahons in County Monaghan and the Kingdom of Airgíalla, until the 17th century. In Scotland, the medieval and post-medieval use of crannogs is also documented into the early 18th century. Whether this increase in status is real, or just a by-product of increasingly complex material assemblages, remains to be convincingly validated.

== History ==
The earliest-known constructed crannog is the completely artificial Neolithic islet of Eilean Dòmhnuill, Loch Olabhat on North Uist in Scotland. Eilean Domhnuill has produced radiocarbon dates ranging from 3650 to 2500 BC. Irish crannogs appear in middle Bronze Age layers at Ballinderry (1200–600 BC). Recent radiocarbon dating of worked timber found in Loch Bhorghastail on the Isle of Lewis has produced evidence of crannogs as old as 3380–3630 BC. Prior to the Bronze Age, the existence of artificial island settlement in Ireland is not as clear. While lakeside settlements are evident in Ireland from 4500 BC, these settlements are not crannogs, as they were not intended to be islands. Despite having a lengthy chronology, their use was not at all consistent or unchanging.

Crannog construction and occupation was at its peak in Scotland from about 800 BC to AD 200. Not surprisingly, crannogs have useful defensive properties, although there appears to be more significance to prehistoric use than simple defense, as very few weapons or evidence for destruction appear in excavations of prehistoric crannogs. In Ireland, crannogs were at their zenith during the Early Historic period, when they were the homes and retreats of kings, lords, prosperous farmers and, occasionally, socially marginalised groups, such as monastic hermits or metalsmiths who could work in isolation. Despite scholarly concepts supporting a strict Early Historic evolution, Irish excavations are increasingly uncovering examples that date from the "missing" Iron Age in Ireland.

== Construction ==
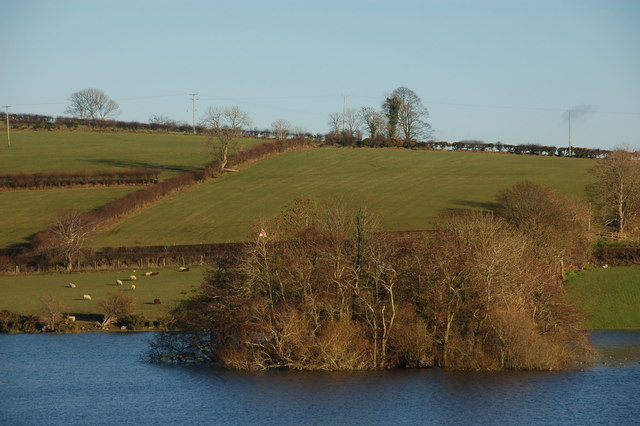
Loughbrickland Crannóg in Northern Ireland.

The construction techniques for a crannog (prehistoric or otherwise) are as varied as the multitude of finished forms that make up the archaeological record. Island settlement in Scotland and Ireland is manifest through the entire range of possibilities ranging from entirely natural, small islets to completely artificial islets, therefore definitions remain contentious. For crannogs in the strict sense, typically the construction effort began on a shallow reef or rise in the lochbed.

When timber was available, many crannogs were surrounded by a circle of wooden piles, with axe-sharpened bases that were driven into the bottom, forming a circular enclosure that helped to retain the main mound and prevent erosion. The piles could also be joined by mortise and tenon, or large holes cut to carefully accept specially shaped timbers designed to interlock and provide structural rigidity. On other examples, interior surfaces were built up with any mixture of clay, peat, stone, timber or brush – whatever was available. In some instances, more than one structure was built on crannogs.

In other types of crannogs, builders and occupants added large stones to the waterline of small natural islets, extending and enlarging them over successive phases of renewal. Larger crannogs could be occupied by extended families or communal groups, and access was either by logboats or coracles. Evidence for timber or stone causeways exists on a large number of crannogs. The causeways may have been slightly submerged; this has been interpreted as a device to make access difficult but may also be a result of loch level fluctuations over the ensuing centuries or millennia. Organic remains are often found in excellent condition on these water-logged sites. The bones of cattle, deer, and swine have been found in excavated crannogs, while remains of wooden utensils and even dairy products have been completely preserved for several millennia.

=== Fire and reconstruction ===
In June 2021, the Loch Tay Crannog was seriously damaged in a fire but funding was given to repair the structure, and conserve the museum materials retained. The reconstructed Crannog will open in June 2026.

== Sources ==
- Burnett, George (1901). Allardyce, J. (ed.). The Family of Burnett of Leys. Aberdeen: New Spalding Club.
- Armit, Ian (2000). Scotland's Hidden History. Tempus Publishing. ISBN 0-7524-1400-3.
- Crone, Anne (2000). The History of a Scottish Lowland Crannog: Excavations at Buiston. Monographs. Edinburgh: AOC/STAR.
- Halsall, Guy (2003). Warfare and Society in the Barbarian West, 450–900. London: Routledge.

== See also ==
- Island castle
