= Iselborgh =

Castle in Scotland

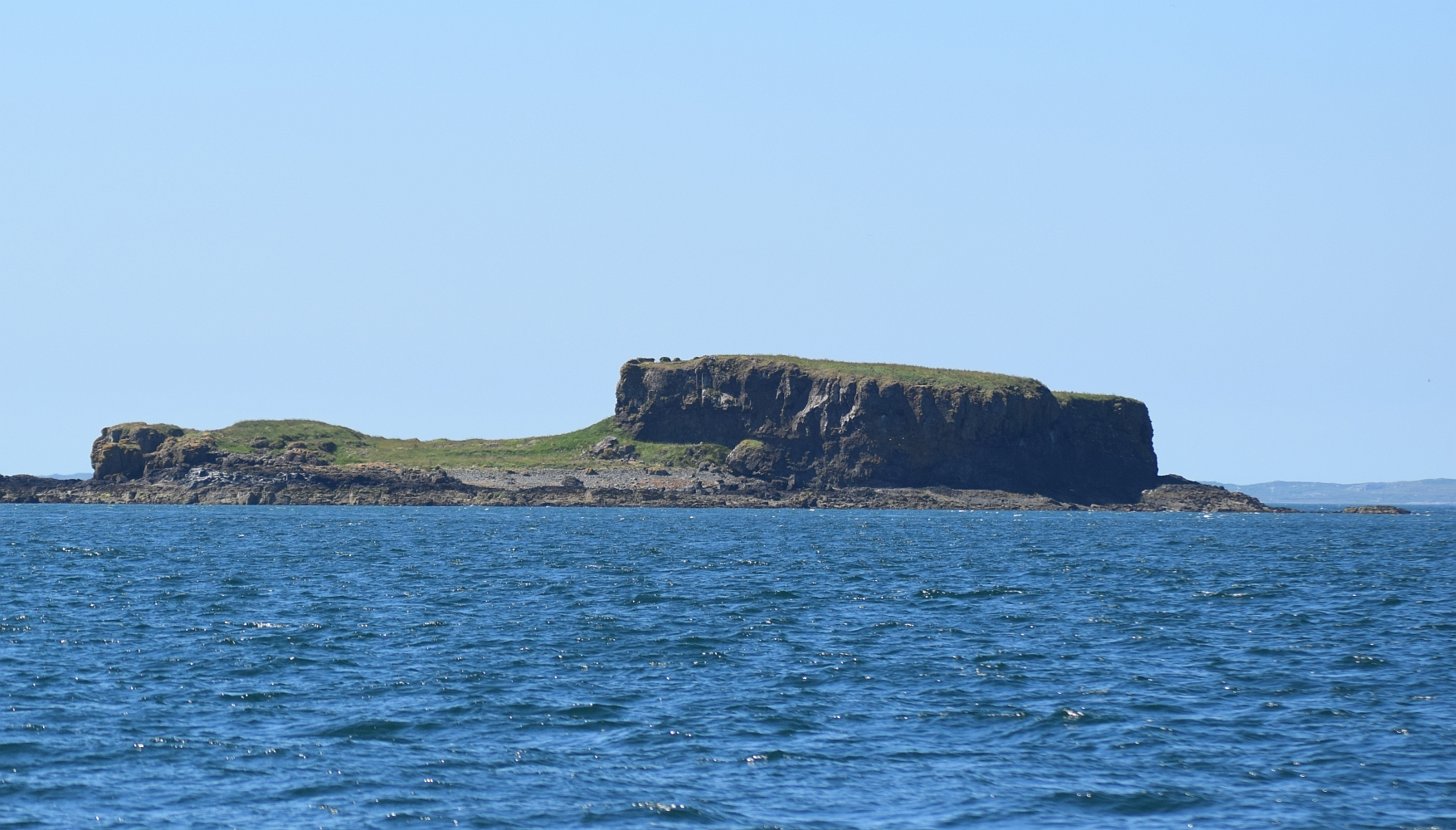
- Cairn na Burgh Beag, a possible location for Iselborgh

- Argyll and Bute showing the location of Cairnburgh Castle. Tiree is to the west, Mull to the east and Coll to the northwest.
- 56.518°N 6.38°W

Iselborgh or Isleborg is a fortification of uncertain location on the western seaboard of Scotland. Suggested sites for the castle are: Cairn na Burgh Beag, the smaller islet that forms part of Cairnburgh Castle; a former castle in Loch an Eilien on Tiree; and somewhere on the nearby islands of Mull and Coll.

There are a few written records of the castle's existence from the 14th to the late 15th century indicating its presence off the coast of Argyll. The name may mean simply "island fort".

== Historical records ==
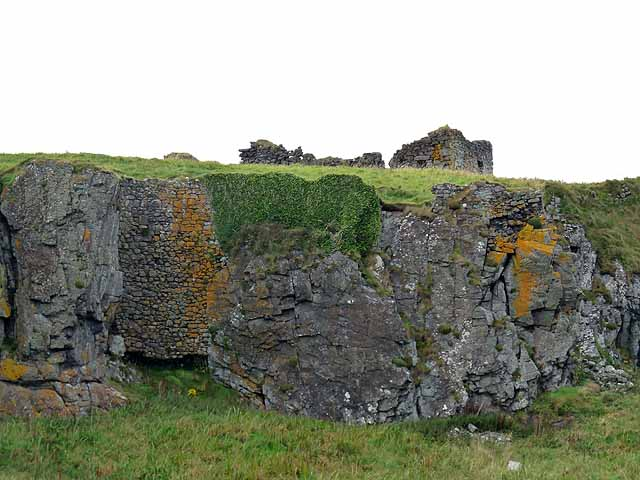
The ruins of Cairnburgh Castle on Cairn na Burgh Mòr

The first certain reference was in 1343 when the castle was granted by David II to John of Islay, Lord of the Isles along with Cairnburgh in the Treshnish Isles and Dùn Chonnuill in the Garvellachs. There is also mention in the 13th century Hákonar saga Hákonarsonar of four castles held by Ewen MacDougall of Lorn from the Norwegian crown. Supposedly, MacDougall met the Scottish king Alexander II circa 1249 and "refused a demand for Cairburngmore and three other castles" so it is possible that Iselborgh was one of them.

In 1354 John Gallda MacDougall of Lorn is recorded as giving up any claim to the castles of "Kerneburch and Hystylburch" to John of Islay, the latter being a presumed reference to Iselborgh.

In a 1495 confirmation of a 1390 charter, John of Islay's son Donald granted "command and possession of the castles of Kernaborg and Isleborg together with small Floda and Lunga" to Lachlan Lùbanach Maclean of Duart.

Hector MacLean of Duart was recorded as the "heritable keeper of the following castles" in 1493:- "Dowart in Mull; Carneburgh in the Treshnish Isles off the north-west coast of Mull; Dunconnell in Scarba; Dunkerd in the Garveloch Isles near Scarba; and Isleborg, the locality of which is uncertain". (Note: "Dowart in Mull" is Castle Duart; "Carneburgh in the Treshnish Isles" is Cairnburgh; "Dunconnell in Scarba" is likely to be Dùn Chonnuill; "Dunkerd in the Garveloch Isles near Scarba" is not of certain location. It was also mentioned in 1390 and may have referred to the buildings separate from the summit castle in the northeastern corner of Dùn Chonnuill that are likely to be of a similar date. The name could be from Dun nan Ceard - fort of the smiths.)

== Etymology ==
"Borgh" is evidently from Old Norse: borg meaning fort. The most straightforward rendering of Iselborg is therefore simply "island fort". Another possibility is that "isel" is a rendering of Scottish Gaelic: iosal meaning "low". There are 46 Scottish placenames that contain this Gaelic word but in no such case does it form the commencement of the name. "Isel" could conceivably come from Old Norse: ila, a well or spring.

== Location ==
=== Cairn na Burgh Beag ===
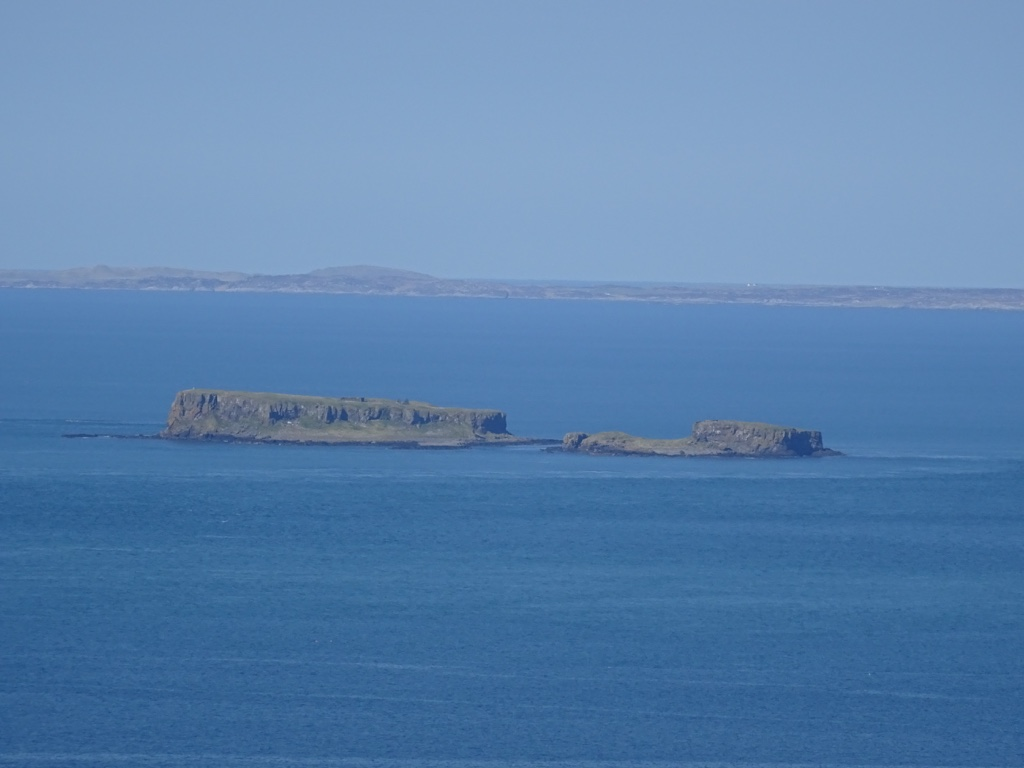
Cairn na Burgh Mòr at left and Cairn na Burgh Beag with Coll in the distance

An unusual feature of the Cairnburgh Castle its that its defences straddle both the island of Cairn na Burgh Mòr itself and its smaller companion isle. Cairn na Burgh Mòr contains a barrack block, chapel, courtyard and guard-house and Cairn na Burgh Beag has another guard-house and a well. Given that "small Floda and Lunga" mentioned in 1495 are also in the Treshnish Isles, Duncan and Brown concluded that Iselborg "certainly lay, with Cairnburgmore, in the Treshnish Group". In 1980 the RCAHMS also believed that "there appear to be good grounds for accepting the view that Isleborgh is an early name" for Cairn na Burgh Beag.

=== Tiree ===
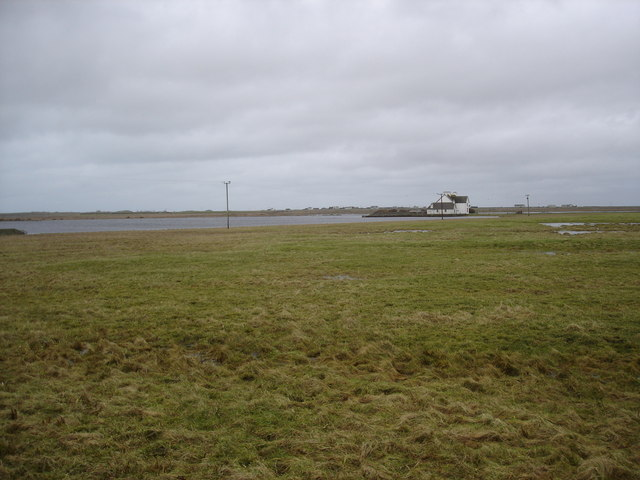
Loch an Eilein on Tiree - the house was constructed in 1748 on a peninsula that was once a small island on which a castle stood

In 1903 Erskine Beveridge had concluded that Loch an Eilien on Tiree was a more likely location for Iselborg. The loch is near the modern settlement of Heylipol which name, with a variety of spellings such as Hilibol, is the second most attested placename on Tiree of Norse origin. Holliday speculates that the first syllable has a similarity to "isel" and that the possibility of isel having a relationship to the Norse ila may be evidence for the two being one and the same. There was certainly a substantial fortification at this location on Tiree, the Old Statistical Account of the late 18th century referring to castle with a drawbridge there at some point in the past. John of Fordun also referred to a turris est fortissima (very strong tower) on the island in the 14th century and Dean Monro in his 16th century Description to "ane fresh water loch, with ane auld castell". By the late 17th century however, it lay in ruins. There is a reference to the "Inch of Teinlipeil" (probably the "island of Hilibol") in relation to the death of Sir Donald Galda MacDonald of Lochalsh in 1519 (Note: Holliday is quoting Gregory but states it is about the death of a Donald Maclean.) but otherwise the castle's name is unrecorded.

The challenge with this option is that although the castle on Tiree clearly had a military importance, the other castles and locations mentioned along with Iselborgh - Dùn Chonnuill, Cairnburgh, Duart, Floda and Lunga are all islands or on the coast and their positions commanded the sea lanes. Loch an Eilien is a freshwater body about 1 km (0.62 mi) from the coast and the castle was on an island in that loch (now a peninsula) with no access to the sea. The Old Statistical Account describes the castle on Tiree as being similar to Breachacha Castle on Coll, although this too is on the coast. Nonetheless, Holliday's conclusion is that if Iselborgh is a "name with no place" and the castle on Tiree is a place with an uncertain name then this is the "most plausible" conclusion to the puzzle.

=== Other Options ===
R.W. Munro, writing in 1973, suggested that there was not "sufficient evidence that Isleborg 'certainly' lay in the Treshnish group, as Kernaborg undoubtedly does; why should there be two castles there?... If therefore we have to look beyond the Treshnish group, why not in Mull, or even in neighbouring Coll or Tiree?" (Note: Two castles in such a small archipelago does seem unlikely but it is clear that Cairnburgh Castle's fortifications lay across the two Cairnburghs.) but does not appear to have offered any specific suggestions.

== See also ==
- Hinba a nearby island of unknown location.
- Jomsborg a legendary Viking stronghold on the coast of the Baltic Sea
- Laithlind, which may have been a Norse kingdom in western Scotland in the 9th century but no certain location is known.
