= Cairn na Burgh Beag =

Island in Scotland

Cairn na Burgh Beag (Gaelic)

Location
- Cairn na Burgh Beag shown relative to Mull
- OS grid reference: NM308449
- Coordinates: 56.52°N 6.38°W

Name
- Name meaning: (small) "fort on good land"
- Old Norse name: Kiarnaborg

Physical geography
- Island group: Treshnish Isles
- Area: 1.2 ha (3.0 acres)
- Highest elevation: 22 m (72 ft)

Administration
- Council area: Argyll and Bute
- Country: Scotland
- Sovereign state: United Kingdom

Demographics
- Population: 0

Cairn na Burgh Beag is one of the Treshnish Isles in the Inner Hebrides, Scotland.

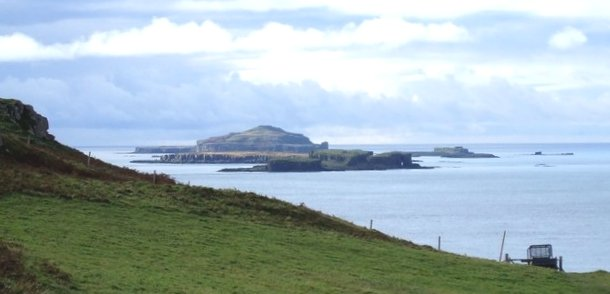
The Treshnish Isles from above Port Haunn on Mull. Nearest are Cairn na Burgh Beag and Cairn na Burgh Mòr. Behind are the low flat island of Fladda and the tallest island, Lunga, which obscures Bac Mòr and Bac Beag beyond.

Cairn na Burgh Beag is the smaller of the two "Carnburgs" (as they are nicknamed) at the northeastern end of the Treshnish Isles in the Inner Hebrides. (The other is Cairn na Burgh Mòr.) Cairnburgh Castle, which guards the entrance to Loch Tuath on the west coast of Mull, is located on the larger of the pair. However, an unusual feature of the castle is that its defences straddle both islands: There is a small guard-house and a well on Cairn na Burgh Beag.

Both of these grassy islands are remnants of ancient lava flows, and both have a distinctive profile; they area flat-topped and trimmed with cliffs.

In 1343 there was a reference to the castle of Iselborgh, which was granted by David II to John of Islay, Lord of the Isles along with Cairn na Burgh Mòr and Dùn Chonnuill in the Garvellachs. Duncan and Brown concluded that Iselborg "certainly lay, with Cairnburgmore, in the Treshnish Group" and in 1980 the RCAHMS also believed that "there appear to be good grounds for accepting the view that Isleborgh is an early name" for Cairn na Burgh Beag. There are however other possible locations for this castle.
