= Bac Beag =

Island in the Inner Hebrides, Scotland

Bac Beag (Gaelic)

Location
- Bac Beag shown relative to Mull
- OS grid reference: NM238377
- Coordinates: 56.451°N 6.483°W

Name
- Name meaning: little bank or obstacle

Physical geography
- Island group: Treshnish Isles
- Area: ha
- Highest elevation: m

Administration
- Council area: Argyll and Bute
- Country: Scotland
- Sovereign state: United Kingdom

Demographics
- Population: 0

Bac Beag is a Scottish island, one of the Treshnish Isles in the Inner Hebrides.

== Origin of name ==
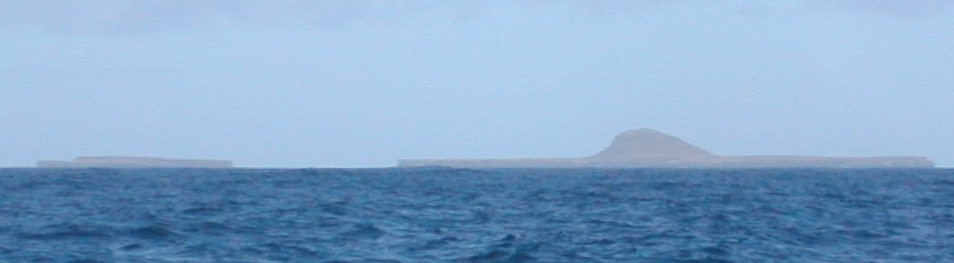
Bac Beag and Bac Mòr

The Gaelic name has several possible interpretations. The meaning of Beag clearly means “small” (as opposed to Bac Mòr, its larger sister), but the word Bac can mean either a "bank", or an "obstacle" or "hindrance".

== Geography ==
Bac Beag, along with its sister island, Bac Mor, lies south of Lunga, and is at the south-western end of the Treshnish Isles’ chain. In contrast to Bac Mòr, Bac Beag is low-lying and fairly flat. It is of volcanic origin.

== Wildlife ==
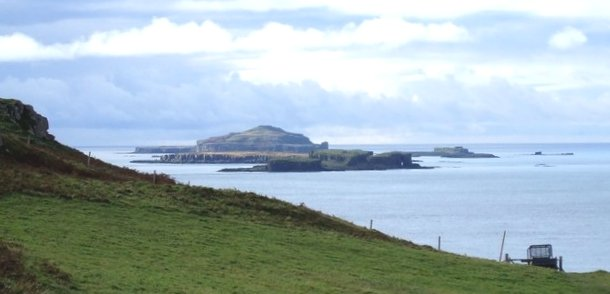
The Treshnish Isles from above Port Haunn on Mull. Nearest are Cairn na Burgh Beag and Cairn na Burgh Mòr. Behind are the low flat island of Fladda and the tallest island, Lunga, which obscures Bac Mòr and Bac Beag beyond.

Like the other Treshnish Isles, Bac Beag is uninhabited and is owned by a charity, the Hebridean Trust. The Treshnish Isles are designated a Site of Special Scientific Interest and a Special Protection Area due to their importance for breeding seabirds.
