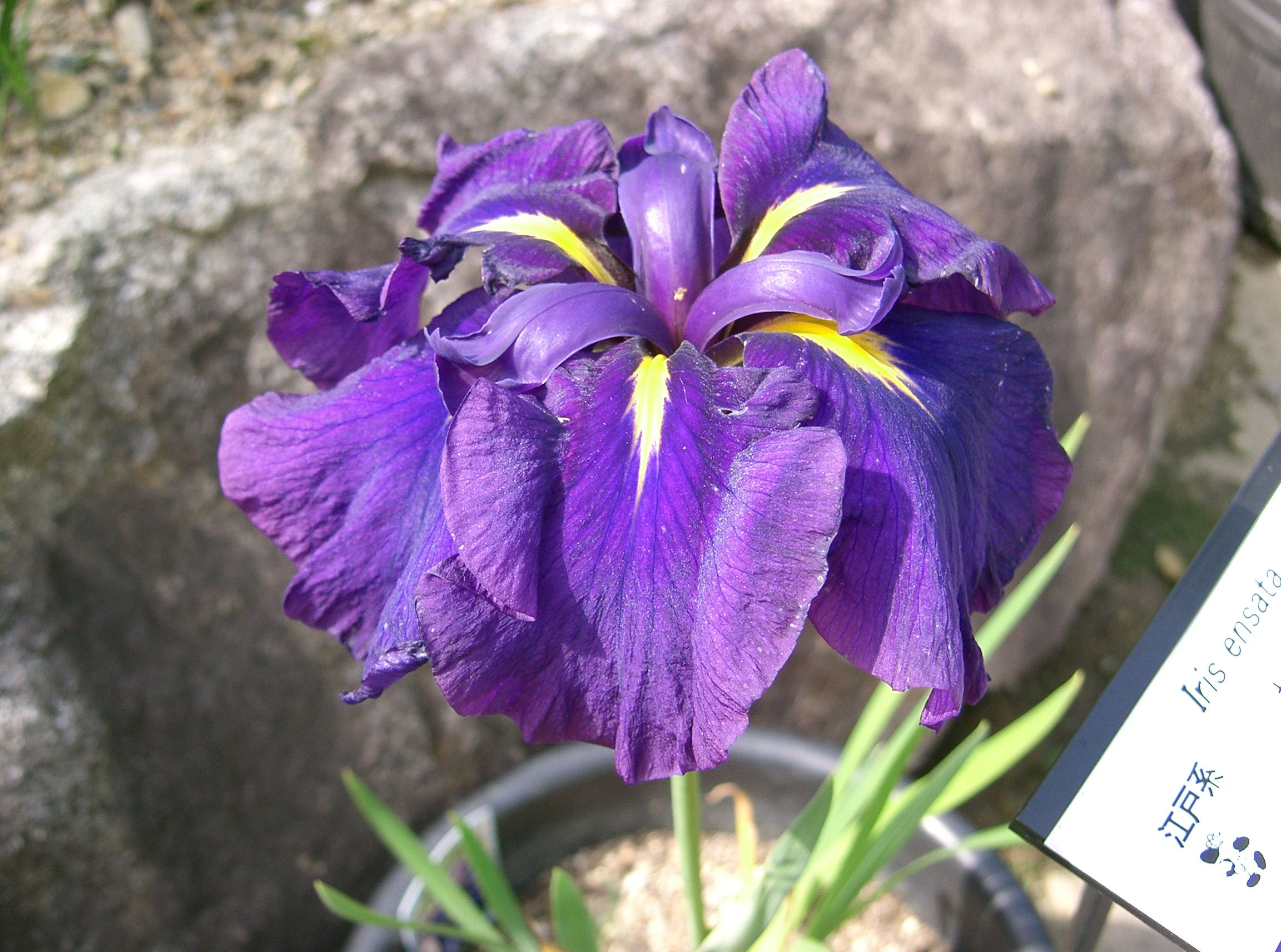
- Iris ensata var. ensata

Scientific classification
- Kingdom: Plantae
- Clade: Tracheophytes
- Clade: Angiosperms
- Clade: Monocots
- Order: Asparagales
- Family: Iridaceae
- Genus: Iris
- Subgenus: Iris subg. Limniris
- Section: Iris sect. Limniris
- Series: Iris ser. Laevigatae; Diels (Lawrence)

Type species
- Iris laevigata

= Iris ser. Laevigatae =

Group of flowering plants

Iris ser. Laevigatae is a series of the genus Iris, in Iris subg. Limniris.

The series was first classified by Diels in 'Die Natürlichen Pflanzenfamilien' (Edited by H. G. A. Engler and K. Prantl) in 1930. It was further expanded by Lawrence in Gentes Herb (written in Dutch) in 1953.

This is a group of mainly moisture loving plants from Europe, Asia and North America. They generally need rich fertile soils, they can tolerate soils with a little lime. They generally flower between early and mid-summer. They have vigorous rhizomes and leaves. They can be easily cultivated in British gardens. The leaves have small blackish spots along the veins. This can be seen when holding the leaf up to the light or under a microscope. This trait means that the species can tolerate moist soils.

They can also cross pollinate between species to create hybrids.

It includes:

Image	Scientific name	Distribution
	Iris ensata Thunb. – Japanese iris, hanashōbu (Japanese) (including I. kaempferi)	Japan, China, Korea and Russia
	Iris laevigata Fisch – rabbit-ear iris, shallow-flowered iris, kakitsubata (Japanese)	Japan
	Iris maackii Maxim.	China and eastern Russia
	Iris pseudacorus L. – yellow iris, yellow flag	Europe, western Asia and northwest Africa.
	Iris versicolor L. – larger blue flag, harlequin blueflag	Eastern Canada and Eastern United States
	Iris virginica L. – Virginia iris	United States from Nebraska to the west, Florida and Texas to the south, New York to the east, and the Canadian border to the north. In Canada, it is native in Ontario and Quebec
