= Cairnburgh Castle =

Castle in Argyll and Bute, Scotland

Coordinates: 56°31′6″N 6°22′52″W

Cairnburgh Castle is a ruined castle that is located on the islands of Cairn na Burgh Mòr and Cairn na Burgh Beag, Argyll and Bute, Scotland. These islands are at the northern extremity of the Treshnish Isles at the mouth of Loch Tuath, Mull north of Iona. 1991's The Changing Scottish Landscape characterizes it as "one of the most isolated fortifications in Britain...[and] also one of the strangest."

== Structure ==
An unusual feature of the castle its that its defences straddle both islands. Cairn na Burgh Mòr contains a barrack block, chapel, courtyard and guard-house and its smaller companion isle has another guard-house and a well.

== History ==
=== 13th century ===
The castle, which may have begun its existence as a Viking fortress called Kiarnaborg, has been held by a variety of individuals since its first recorded appearance in 1249. It is mentioned in the 13th century Hákonar saga Hákonarsonar as the property of an island king of the family of Somerled, demanded of him by Alexander III of Scotland. The Gazetteer for Scotland reports that the castle's owner at least from 1249 to 1269 was Clan MacDougall, descendants of Somerled through his son Dubgall. When the MacDougall clan supported John de Balliol against Robert de Brus in the Wars of Scottish Independence, the Crown seized the castle. Temporarily occupied by Clan MacDonald, it at some point became the property of Clan MacLean.

=== 15th century ===
In 1409, Hector Maclean, chief of Clan Maclean, received a charter from his uncle Donald of Islay, Lord of the Isles for certain lands. In the charter Hector was described as Lord of Duart Castle and constable of the castle of Cairnburg.

=== 16th century ===
While the property of Clan MacLean, the castle was the location of several conflicts, but it was extremely well defended by the cliffs that surrounded it. It was besieged in 1504 by James IV when the MacLeans rebelled in favor of Domhnall Dubh, chief of Clan Donald.

=== 17th century ===
It was briefly taken in 1647 during the War of the Three Kingdoms by General David Leslie. In the next decade, it was torched by Oliver Cromwell's New Model Army. The fire likely caused the demise of a number of manuscripts that had been conveyed to the castle for safety from Iona after the 1561 Act calling for the destruction of "Monuments of Idolatry". In 1679, it stood against the Campbells, but did not stand when attacked again in 1692.

=== 18th century ===
Twice during the Jacobite risings, in 1715 and 1745, the government used Cairnsburgh to house troops. In 1759 it was the birthplace of author Isabella Kelly.
