= Bac Mòr =

Island in Argyll and Bute, Scotland

Bac Mòr (Gaelic)
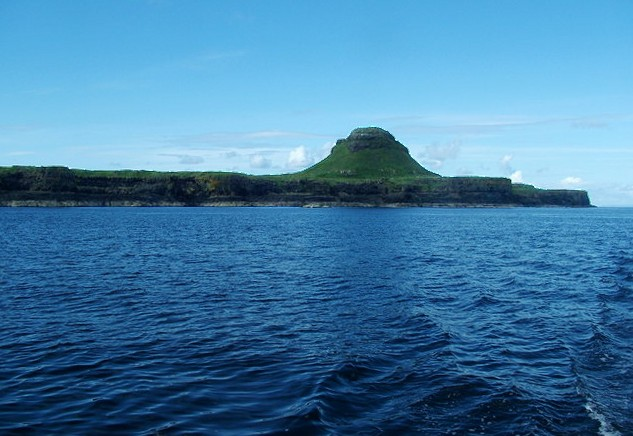
- Bac Mòr viewed from near its shore

Location
- Bac Mòr relative to Mull
- OS grid reference: NM243387
- Coordinates: 56.45°N 6.47°W

Name
- Gaelic pronunciation: [baxk moːɾ]
- Name meaning: large bank or obstacle

Physical geography
- Island group: Treshnish Isles
- Area: ha
- Highest elevation: Dutchman's Cap 86 m

Administration
- Council area: Argyll and Bute
- Country: Scotland
- Sovereign state: United Kingdom

Demographics
- Population: 0

Bac Mòr is a Scottish island, one of the Treshnish Isles, sometimes referred to as The Dutchman's Cap in English because of its shape.

== Origin of name ==
The Gaelic name has more than one possible interpretation. Although Mòr clearly means "large" (as opposed to Bac Beag, its smaller sister), the word Bac can mean either a "bank", or an "obstacle" or "hindrance".

The island's profile is one of the more distinctive amongst the Scottish Islands.

== Geology ==
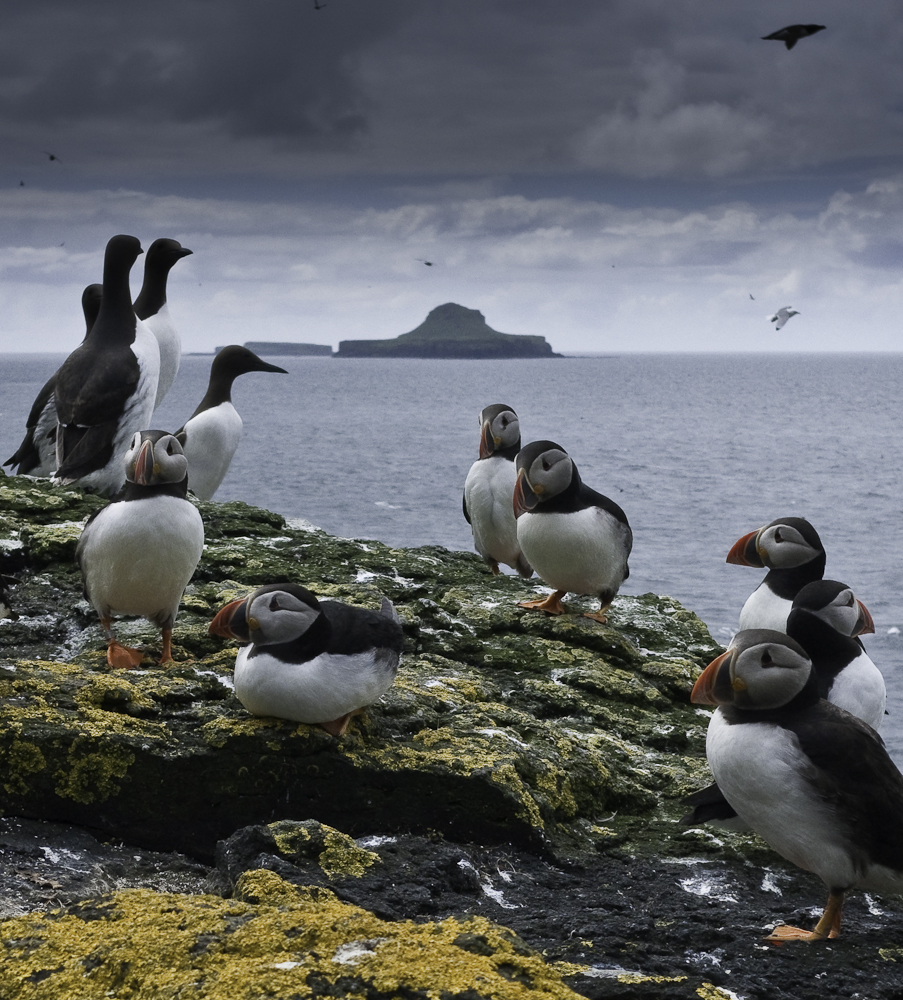
Bac Mòr from Lunga

Bac Mòr is of ancient volcanic origin, and the peak in the middle is a former cone. The low-lying plain surrounding it is a glassy lava field.

The remains of summer sheilings have been found on the island, suggesting that it was inhabited at one time, even though it has no safe landing places.

== Wildlife ==
The Treshnish Isles, which are uninhabited today, are owned by a charity, the Hebridean Trust. They have been collectively designated as a Site of Special Scientific Interest and a Special Protection Area, due to their importance for breeding seabirds. The islands are also home to a number of wildflowers.
