= Isabella Kelly =

Scottish novelist and poet (1759–1857)

Isabella Kelly, née Fordyce, also Isabella Hedgeland (1759–1857) was a Scottish novelist and poet. Her novels have been said to resemble those of Ann Radcliffe.

== Family ==
Isabella Fordyce was born at Cairnburgh Castle in the Scottish Highlands and baptised on 4 May 1759, as the daughter of William Fordyce, Royal Marines officer and later courtier, and Elizabeth (née Fraser). Both her parents had been disowned after their marriage by their wealthy Scottish families.

She married Robert Hawke Kelly (died in or before 1807, probably in Madras), a spendthrift East India Company officer. They had at least three children, including two daughters (one of whom may have died in childhood) and a lawyer son, Fitzroy Edward Kelly, who became Attorney-General. Another son William was strongly befriended as a boy by the writer Matthew Lewis, perhaps with sexual intent. Her second marriage, to a merchant named Hedgeland, ended after a year with his death.

She died aged 98 at 20 Chapel Street (presumably the one in Belgravia), London, on 25 June 1857 and was buried in Kensal Green Cemetery.

== Poems ==
Kelly's Collection of Poems and Fables (1794, 2nd e. 1807) was well subscribed. She claimed that several pieces in it had been written before she was 14. It "includes pathos and social comedy.... She later called her poems 'too personal to please in general'."

== Novels ==
Kelly's ten novels "cater[ed] to popular taste with seemingly haunted abbeys, cross-dressing for disguise, and the fruits of unchastity." She told the Royal Literary Fund in 1832 that she had written ten novels, educational works, and some of a new historical novel that she knew was outdated. Several were published by Minerva Press.

Critics have noted a similarity to the work of Ann Radcliffe in her approach to the Gothic novel. The British Critic, writing in 1798, concedes that Joscelina... is innocent and instructive, but faults it for leading the heroine "through such a variety of trials and miseries, as could hardly fall to the lot of any human creature." In Eva, Kelly was one of several authors of the day, including Matthew Lewis, to attack celibacy, through her character Agatha, who refuses to go into a nunnery because it is cruelly oppressive to deny women "the normal blessings of home and children."

Her novel The Secret was dismissed briefly but squarely by the Monthly Review in October 1806: "Those who delight in useless mysteries and unnecessary horrors may perhaps be gratified by reading these volumes: but, in our judgment, the contemplation of such stories is attended with worse consequences than the mere waste of time. It tends to produce a sickly and irritable state of mind, gives a temporary shock even to intellects that are sound and healthy, but enervates and permanently diseases those which are weak."

- Madeline, or The Castle of Montgomery (1794) (published anonymously)
- The Abbey of St Asaph (1795) ("by the author of Madeline")
- The Ruins of Avondale Priory (1796)
- Joscelina, or The Rewards of Benevolence (1797)
- Eva (1799)
- Ruthinglenne, or The Critical Moment (1801)
- Edwardina (1801) (published under the pseudonym "Catherine Harris")
- The Baron's Daughter (1802)
- A Modern Incident in Domestic Life (1803)
- The Secret (1805)
- Jane de Dunstaneville, or Characters as They Are (1813)

== Non-fiction ==
- A French grammar for children and other educational works
- Instructive Anecdotes for Youth (1819)
- A Memoir of the Late Mrs. Henrietta Fordyce (an elderly relative of hers seen by contemporaries as an archetypal Scots governess, published anonymously, 1823)

== See also ==
- List of Minerva Press authors
- Minerva Press
