= Hinba =

Island in Scotland

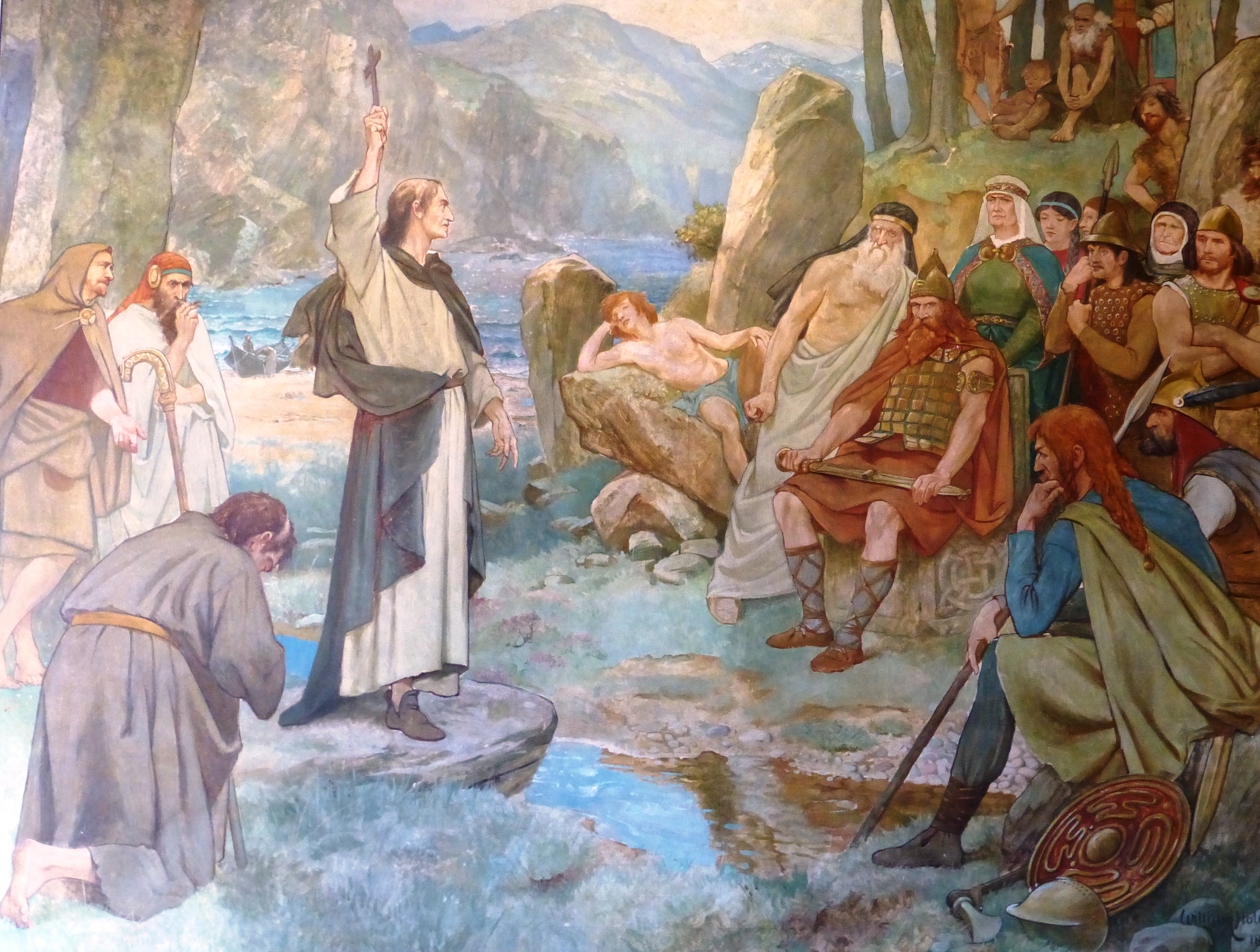
Columba converting Bridei, son of Maelchon, King of the Picts by William Brassey Hole (1899).

Hinba is an island in Scotland of uncertain location that was the site of a small monastery associated with the Columban church on Iona. Although a number of details are known about the monastery and its early superiors, and various anecdotes dating from the time of Columba of a mystical nature have survived, modern scholars are divided as to its whereabouts. The source of information about the island is Adomnán's late 7th-century Vita Columbae.Adomnan

The islands of Eileach an Naoimh, Jura, Colonsay and Oronsay are the most likely candidates, although Seil and Canna are also possibilities.

The origin of the name 'Hinba' appears to be Goidelic. The Hebrides remain the stronghold of the modern Gàidhealtachd and unsurprisingly this language has had a significant influence on the island names still found there. Why then would an island name vanish from the records? As a result of the Norse impact on Scotland from some point prior to 900 AD and for several centuries thereafter many of the Hebridean island names were altered or replaced. It has been argued that these changes to the onomasticon only applied to the islands north of Ardnamurchan and that original Gaelic place names predominate to the south. However, recent research suggests that the obliteration of pre-Norse names throughout the Hebrides was almost total and Gaelic derived place names on the southern islands are of post-Norse origin. Some islands names have been more persistent, especially amongst the larger islands, but it is clear that that is not the case for Hinba.

== Etymology ==
Watson states that the name "Hinba" is "readily explained as a latinised form" of the Old Irish inbe meaning an incision. This was one of the factors that led him to support the deeply indented Jura as the most likely location and in this he was followed by Broderick. However, it is clear that Scottish island names have involved frequent etymological reinterpretation and some of them are pre-Celtic in origin - perhaps even pre-Indo-European - which "leaves us with the thought that practically all the major islands in the Northern and Western Isles have very old names, so old and so linguistically and lexically opaque that we do not have any plausible referents for them elsewhere. They are linguistic fossils, perhaps some three thousand years old or even older." Etymology may therefore not be the best of guides to rely too heavily on in these circumstances.

According to Murray, the name Hinba, derives from the "old" Gaelic in (island) and ba (sea). He speculates that the original name would have been Na Hinba, meaning "the isles of the sea".

== Founding and early administration ==
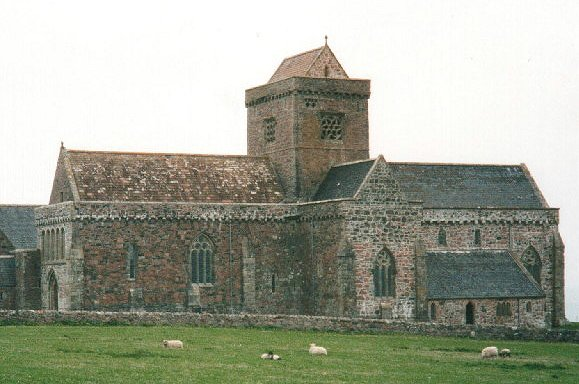
The restored Iona Abbey. In Columba's day all church buildings would have been constructed from wood.

Columba (521–597), the first patron saint of Scotland, arrived in the kingdom of Dál Riata in modern Scotland from his homeland of Ireland in 563, and in the same year was granted land on Iona. This became the centre of his evangelising mission to the Picts. The Celtic monastic system made use of isolated retreat centres they called 'deserts' and there were two or more smaller monastic settlements associated with Iona. Mag Luigne on Tiree was one, Hinba the other, the latter being a favourite destination of Columba's for a period of contemplation. There were also similar outlying colonies on Elene Insula (see below) and Scia (Skye).

It is uncertain when Hinba was founded, but the best estimates put it between 564 and 574, as there is a story (see below) of Columba receiving a message from an angel to ordain Aedan mac Gabrain as King of Dal Riata, which occurred in the year 574. The text of Adomnan's book, also seems to be written as though there was only one monastery on Hinba along with a smaller hermitage.

St. Ernan, superior (praepositus) of Hinba was an uncle of St. Columba and one of the twelve who accompanied Columba from Ireland to Iona. He was appointed head of the community which Columba established on Hinba.

According to Columba's biographer, Ernán was only superior for a few days. In the story recorded, he was told by his nephew before leaving to Hinba that he did not expect to see him again in this life, and several days later, Ernán became sick and went back to Iona to see his nephew, according to his own wish. When Columba was told his uncle had returned, Columba happily went out to meet him in the harbour, but when they were only 50 yards distant, Ernán fell down dead.

Baithéne mac Brénaind was the second abbot of Iona (597–600), and known to have administered the monasteries of both Hinba and Mag Luigne before succeeding to this position.

Adomnán recorded several stories about Columba in relation to the monastery on Hinba. In one, Columba arrived there and granted a relaxation of the dietary rule for penitents. But one individual, named Neman mac Cathir, refused to take this indulgence. Columba then told him that both he and Baithene had given him this relaxation, and someday Neman would find himself in the forest among thieves eating the flesh of a stolen mare. After his penance was finished and he returned to the world, this came to pass.

In another story Columba was on Hinba, excommunicating the sons of Conall mac Domnaill due to their attacks on churches and one of these men came to Columba and attacked him with a spear. One of the monks, who was wearing Columba's cowl, jumped in the way of the attacker and miraculously this garment prevented the spear from penetrating. The attacker then left, thinking he had killed Columba.

== Possible locations ==
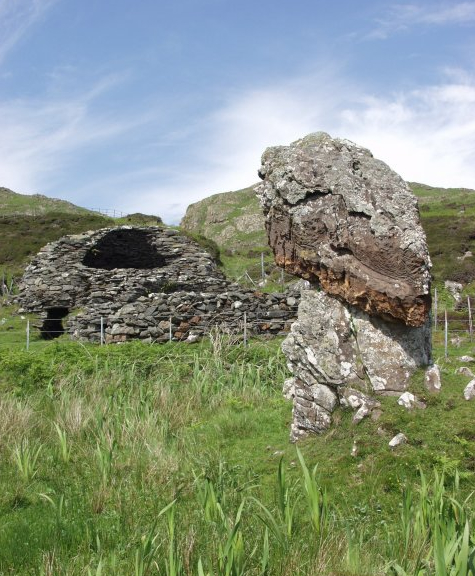
Monk's cell and standing stone, Eileach an Naoimh

=== Eileach an Naoimh ===
This is a rocky islet in the Garvellach group in the Firth of Lorn. Columba is believed to have visited Eileach an Naoimh and it may be the burial site of his mother Eithne. However, Adomnán the chronicler of the life of Columba, describes a settlement that may suggest a larger island than this one, which extends to only 56 ha (138 acres). Adomnán also refers to a place name associated with the island called Muirbolcmar, which is where the hermitage was located. This name is Gaelic for the great sea-bag and its interpretation has proven to be controversial. Watson took the view that it is not an obvious description of anywhere on the rocky coast of Eileach an Naoimh and that Hinba must therefore have been elsewhere.

However, Adomnán notes that Brendan the Navigator set sail from Ireland to visit Columba and found him en route at Hinba. The elderly Brendan might well have chosen to stop off at a monastic settlement he himself had founded many years before on the island of "Ailech". Ailech is "beyond reasonable doubt" Eileach an Naoimh, suggesting that Hinba may have been Ailech continuing under another name. However, Watson suggests that it is "most improbable" that Adomnan would have changed the name "Ailech", the use of which "probably" predates Columba's arrival in the Hebrides, to Hinba and points out that tiny Eileach an Naoimh is "fitted for a penitential station rather than for a self-supporting community such as Columba's monasteries were". Undaunted, writing in 1973 Murray insisted the identification of this island with Hinba "is agreed by all authorities" including William Reeves (1857) and Skene (1876).

=== Jura ===
An alternative proposed by Watson is Jura, some 6 miles (10 kilometres) south east of the Garvellachs. This much larger island is on the main sea route between the heartlands of Dál Riata and Ireland. It contains Loch Tarbert, a large arm of the sea that fits the description of a 'great sea-bag'. An alternative derivation of the name "Hinba" is that it is from the Old Irish inbe meaning 'incision', a description that could fit either Loch Tarbert or the prominent gap between the island's main hills, the Paps of Jura.

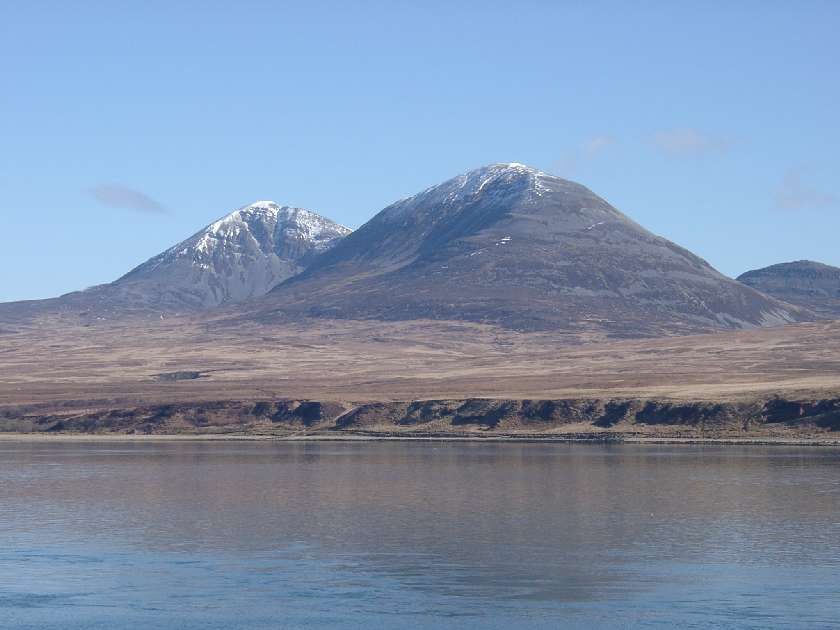
Two of the Paps of Jura.

However, other scholars have taken the view that there is no reason to interpret Adomnán's text to mean that 'Muirbolcmar' is a place on Hinba, but rather that it describes Hinba's position. A 'great sea-bag' is a fair description of the Firth of Lorn. Murray notes that the English version of his proposed derivation from "isles of the sea" is a modern variant name for the Garvellachs, further conflating Hinba with Eileach an Naoimh and its immediate neighbours. Murray goes so far as to say that Watson was "confused" and quotes four other authorities as being satisfied that Eileach an Naoimh and Hinba are the same.

On the other hand, Marsden (1995) describes Watson's arguments as "a very convincing alternative" noting that Watson records a local name for Jura of t-Eilean Ban ('the blessed isle') and a cave on Jura's shores called Uaimh mhuinntir Idhe ('the cave of the folk of Hy [Iona]'). Marsden adds to this that Ernan the one-time prior of Hinba is known to have been buried at Kellernandale on Jura and that an (unidentified) Ancient Monument's Commission report on Iona contains an entry of 'Hinba (Jura?)'.

=== Oronsay ===
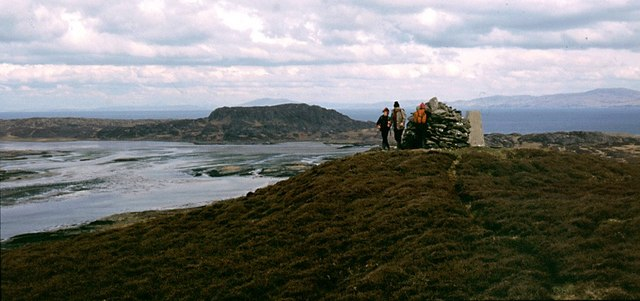
The summit of Beinn Oronsay with Beinn Eibhne on Colonsay beyond

Watson also discusses Oronsay as a possible candidate. This tidal islet had a medieval priory, the tidal bay between the isle and Colonsay has a "bag-like horn" to the north and it is en route from Ireland to Iona. Indeed, Columba first landed here on his initial journey from Ireland to Iona, but continued onwards when he discovered he could still see Ireland from the summit of Oronsay.

The derivation of the name Oronsay may be from Oran's Isle, St Oran being a companion of Saint Columba and the founder of the island's original monastery in 563. Murray states that the original Gaelic name was Eilean Orain (although no source is provided for this statement). Oran's original monastery may have been a dependency of Kiloran Abbey on nearby Colonsay. However, there are other examples of this name elsewhere in the Hebrides where the name comes from Örfirisey which translates from Old Norse as "tidal" or "ebb island" so once again etymology is not conclusive evidence.

The micro-climate of Colonsay/Oronsay is also similar to that of Iona and Tiree, being both sunnier and drier than Jura or Seil.

=== Canna ===
Another possible site is Canna near Rùm, about 64 miles (103 kilometres) north west of the Garvellachs.

Watson wrote that Hinba "appears to have lain in the track of vessels coming from Ireland, at least that seems to be the inference from the fact that Comgell, Cainnech, Brendan, and Cormac, coming from Ireland to visit Columba, found him in Hinba". Canna is a most unlikely landfall if this is the case as it is well to the north of and thus beyond Iona and Tiree he and concluded that the choice of location for Hinba therefore "seems to lie between Colonsy and Jura."

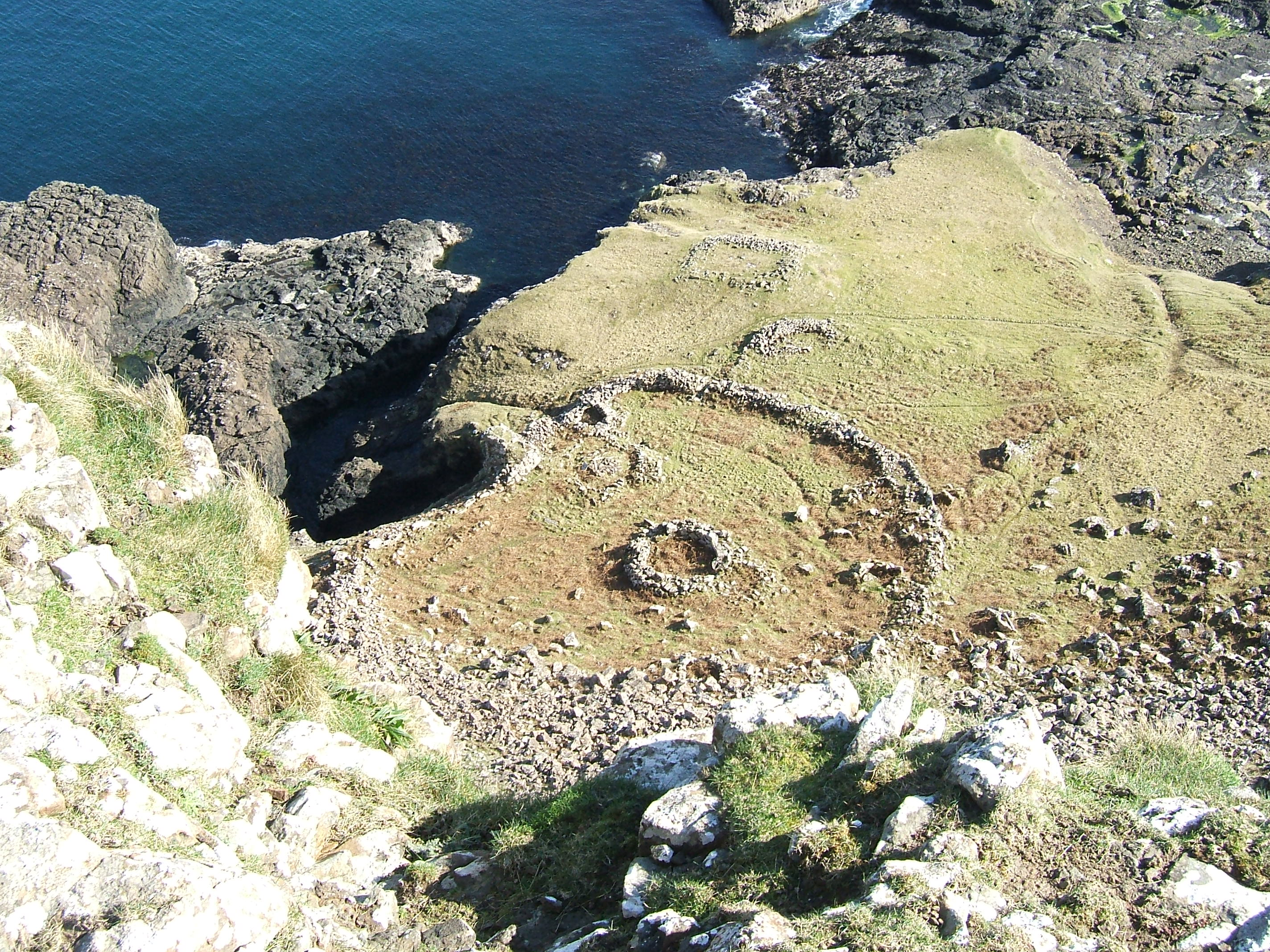
The ruins at Sgorr nam Ban-naomha, on Canna, identified as a possible site for Columba's monastery on Hinba.

Nonetheless, a strong case has been made for Canna based in part on the relative abundance of early Christian artefacts found on the island. O'Neil also argues that the oft-quoted passage from Adomnán's Life:

Alio in tempore iiii. ad sanctum uisitandum Columbam monasteriorum sancti fundatores de Scotia transmeantes in Hinba eum inuenerunt insula (Once, four saints who had founded monasteries in Ireland came to visit St Columba. When they arrived at Hinba, they found him there.)

does not require the saints involved to have travelled from Ireland to Iona via Hinba. She adds that although Watson wrote that Hinba "was not very far from Iona, for Columba often visited it" that this merely reflects the success of "Adomnan's propaganda" in asserting that Iona was at the centre of a "large and powerful ecclesiastical organisation" when the Life makes it plain that Columba was often to be found elsewhere and Iona perhaps only became such after his lifetime. The same author also takes a quite different view of the meaning of muirbolc arguing that this may mean 'a place where rapidly down-flowing water is contained' and offers a site near the modern settlement of A'Chill as a possibility.

The Ravenna Cosmography, which was compiled by an anonymous cleric in Ravenna around AD 700, mentions various Scottish island names. This document frequently used maps as a source of information and it has been possible to speculate about their modern equivalents based on assumptions about voyages made by early travellers 300–400 years prior to its creation. Youngson, who draws heavily on the work of the Gaelic scholar Donald MacEachern for his identifications of Scottish islands mentioned by both Adomnán and in the Cosmography identifies Canna as Elvania in the Ravenna list and by extension as Adomnán's Elena. As it is clear from Adomnán that Elena had a monastery distinct from those on Iona, Tiree and Hinba this identification would not admit Canna as equivalent to Hinba. The Ravenna list however is "obscure in the extreme" and cannot be considered conclusive evidence. For example, Elvania may refer to Loch Awe and the River Awe or Nave Island off Islay.

=== Seil ===
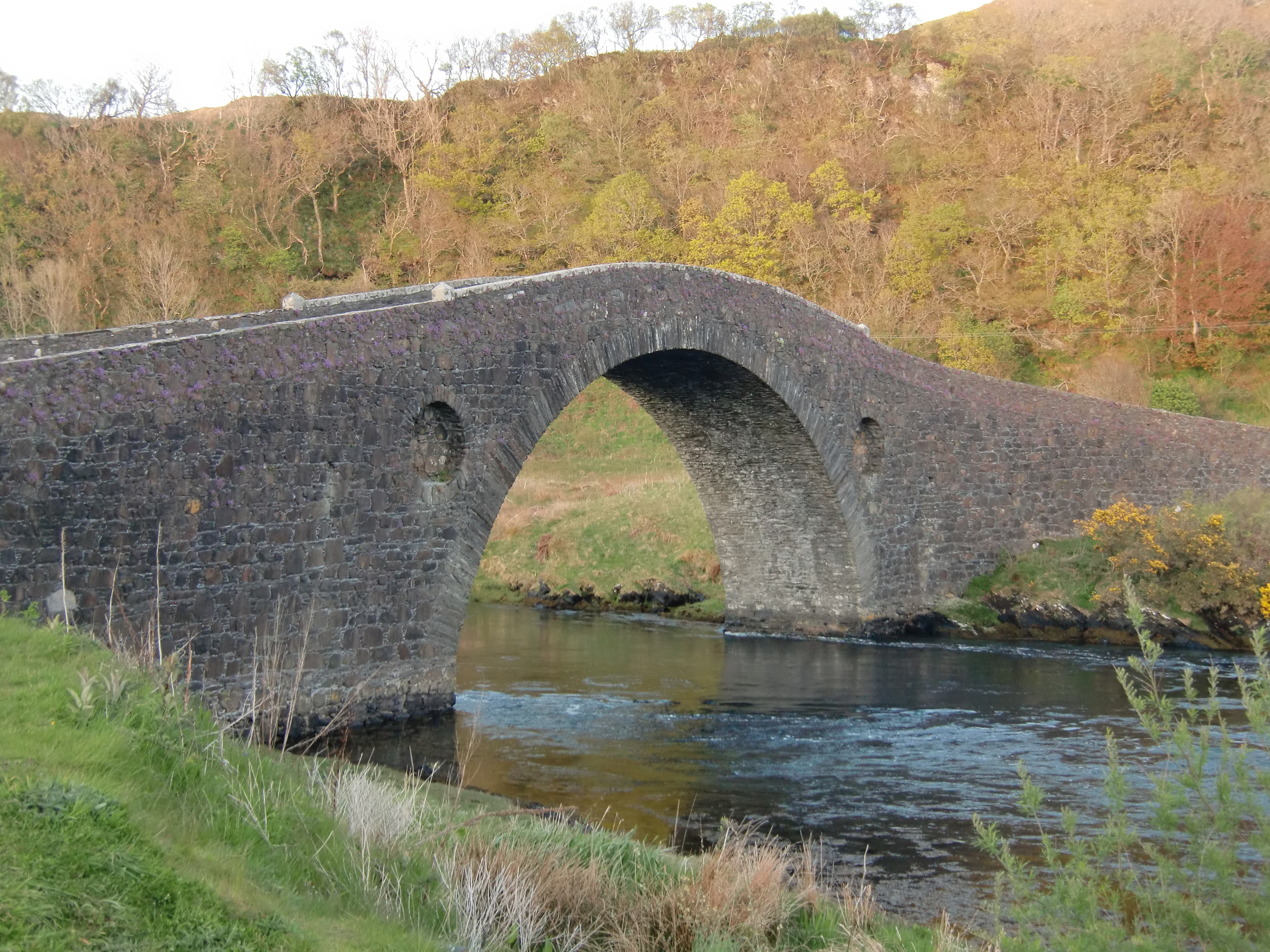
Fast-flowing sea water under the 18th century Clachan Bridge that links Seil to mainland Scotland

The island of Seil lies to the north east of the Gravellachs and close to the mainland. Rae (2011) has suggested it as possible location of Hinba on various grounds. These include its association with Brendan, its location on an inshore trade route from Antrim to the north and its suitability for a substantial settlement. He suggests that the Muirbolcmar could refer to the Seil Sound and narrows at Clachan Bridge where the "bag" captures the rapidly flowing water that floods under the bridge and also argues for this location on etymological grounds. Equating "Hinba" with the Gaelic Inbhir, he notes that the adjacent mainland parish of Kilninver means "church of Inbhir" and suggests that the derivation of "Seil" maybe of Scandinavian origin with similarities to the East Frisian place name Zijl or Syl meaning a "seep or passage of water". This, he proposes, could have been a Norse interpretation of Hinba/Inbhir. However, Mac an Tàilleir (2003) notes that Kilninver or Cill an Inbhir "appears to mean 'church by the river mouth', although an older form of Cill Fhionnbhair, 'Finbar's church' also appears.

It has also been suggested that Seil may be the Innisibsolian referred to in the Chronicle of the Kings of Alba, which records a victory of the Scots over a Viking force during the time of Donald II in the 9th century. Innisibsolian is of Goidelic origin and if Solian is derived from 'Seil' as this early date it is hardly likely to have had a different Gaelic name prior to the arrival of the Norse. Furthermore, although south of Iona, Seil is not on a direct route to Iona from Ireland and there are very strong tides in this area.

=== Colonsay ===
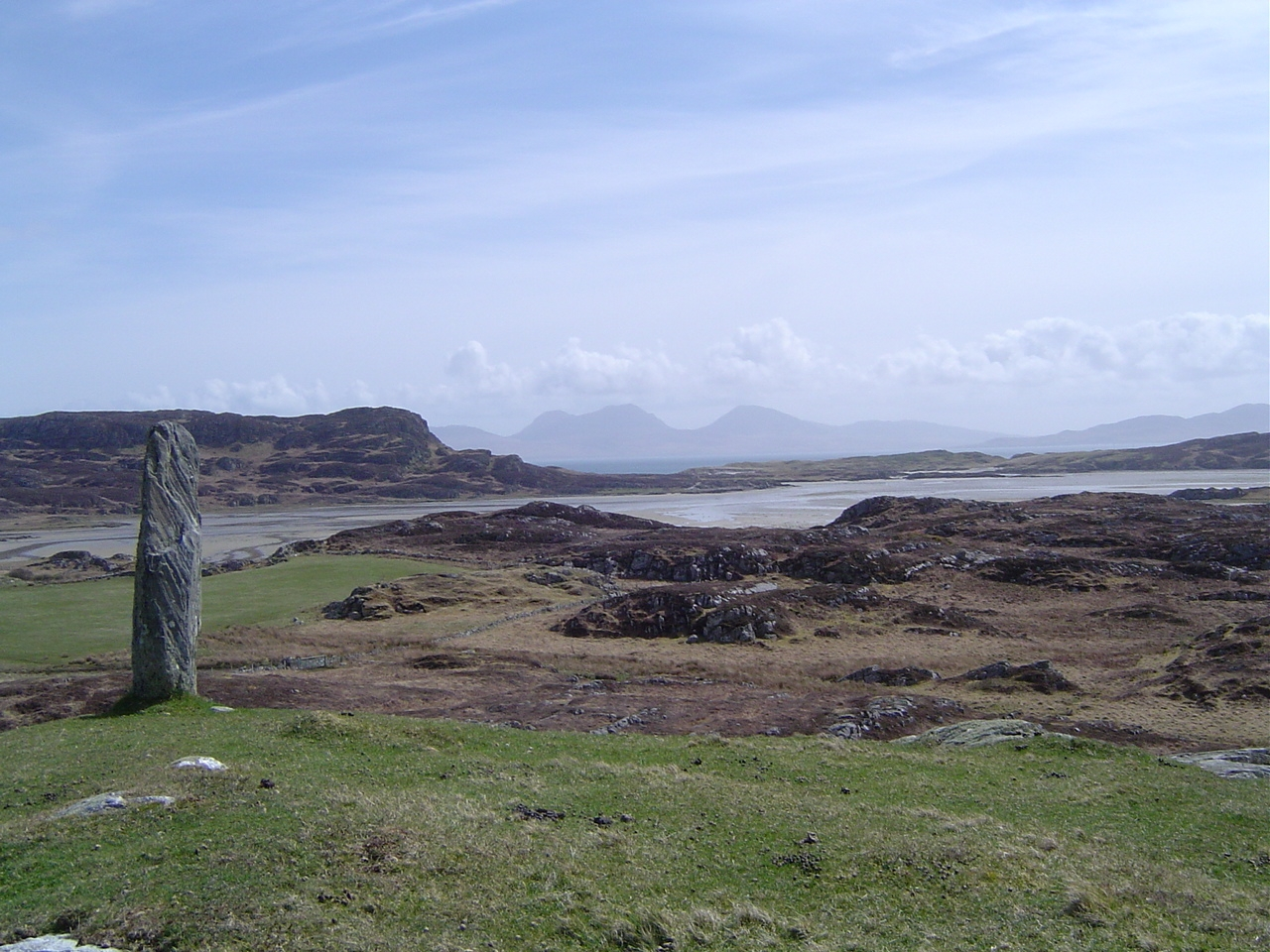
View over Colonsay and Oronsay to the right, with the Paps of Jura in the distance

Colonsay is a larger companion isle to Oronsay, separated by a narrow strait which dries at low tides. Kelly Kilpatrick notes that Hinba "is the second most widely attested island-name [in Adomnán]. After extensive research, I have concluded that Hinba is likely to be identified with Colonsay, and perhaps both Colonsay and Oronsay. The place-name Muirbolc már 'great seabag' is comparable with other muirbolc places (e.g. Kentra Bay, Adomnàn's "muirbolc paradise", and Murlough Bay, Co. Down, both characterised as being nearly empty of water when the tide is out, exposing sands). Muirbolc már should be identified with The Strand [between Colonsay and Oronsay]".

Although little can be certain about the identities of the isles in the Ravenna documents, Youngson also writes that "MacEachern is the only scholar to write on the subject who pays any attention at all to the fact that in extract XXI Adomnán refers to an island called Hinbina - presumably "Little Hinba". Only Colonsay and Oronsay provide a large and little island". This sounds definitive enough, although Canna also has a smaller tidal island companion in Sanday.

== Mystical events ==
Adomnán records that when Columba was visited on Hinba by St. Comgall, St. Brendan, and their two companion saints, during a Mass Brendan saw a luminous globe of fire above Columba's head. This "continued burning and rising up like a column of flame, till the Holy Mysteries had been completed". On a separate occasion whilst visiting Hinba, Columba saw "heavenly visions and revelations" that lasted for three days and nights.

In another story from Adomnan, Columba was living on the island of Hinba and at night he entered into a mental trance and he saw an angel of God coming to him holding a glass book on the ordination of kings. Columba received the book from him and began to read it. In the book, the command was given that he should ordain Áedán mac Gabráin as king of Dal Riata. Columba did not want to do so, because he considered Áedán's brother Eoganán to be a better candidate. The angel then struck Columba with a whip, which gave him a scar that Columba carried the rest of his life. The angel then sternly spoke to Columba and told him that he had been sent by God with this glass book to have Columba ordain Áedán as king, but if he refused, then the angel would strike him again. The angel came back to Columba each night for three days. Columba then left Hinba to go to Iona, where Áedán had already arrived in order to be ordained.

== See also ==
- List of islands of Scotland
- Iselborgh a nearby castle of unknown location.
