= Cairn na Burgh Mòr =

Island in Scotland

Cairn na Burgh Mòr (Gaelic)

Location
- Cairn na Burgh Mòr shown relative to Mull
- OS grid reference: NM305448
- Coordinates: 56.518°N 6.38°W

Name
- Name meaning: Norse name possibly meaning (large) "fort on good land"
- Old Norse name: Kiarnaborg

Physical geography
- Island group: Treshnish Isles
- Area: 1.36 ha (3.4 acres)
- Highest elevation: 35 m (115 ft)

Administration
- Council area: Argyll and Bute
- Country: Scotland
- Sovereign state: United Kingdom

Demographics
- Population: 0

Cairn na Burgh Mòr (also Cairnburgh More) is one of the Treshnish Isles in the Inner Hebrides of Scotland.

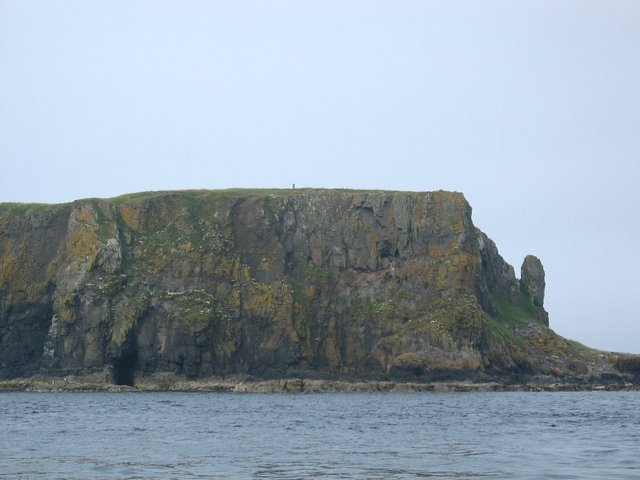
Cairn na Burgh Mòr.

Cairn na Burgh Mòr is the larger of the two "Carnburgs" (as they are nicknamed) at the northeastern end of the Treshnish Isles in the Inner Hebrides - the other being "Cairn na Burgh Beag". The larger of a pair guards the entrance to Loch Tuath on the west coast of Mull. These grassy islands are both remnants of ancient lava flows, and have a distinctive profile: flat-topped and trimmed with cliffs. Cairn na Burgh Mòr has fortifications on the grassy slope. Cairnburgh Castle and a chapel are located on the isle.

It is no longer inhabited.
