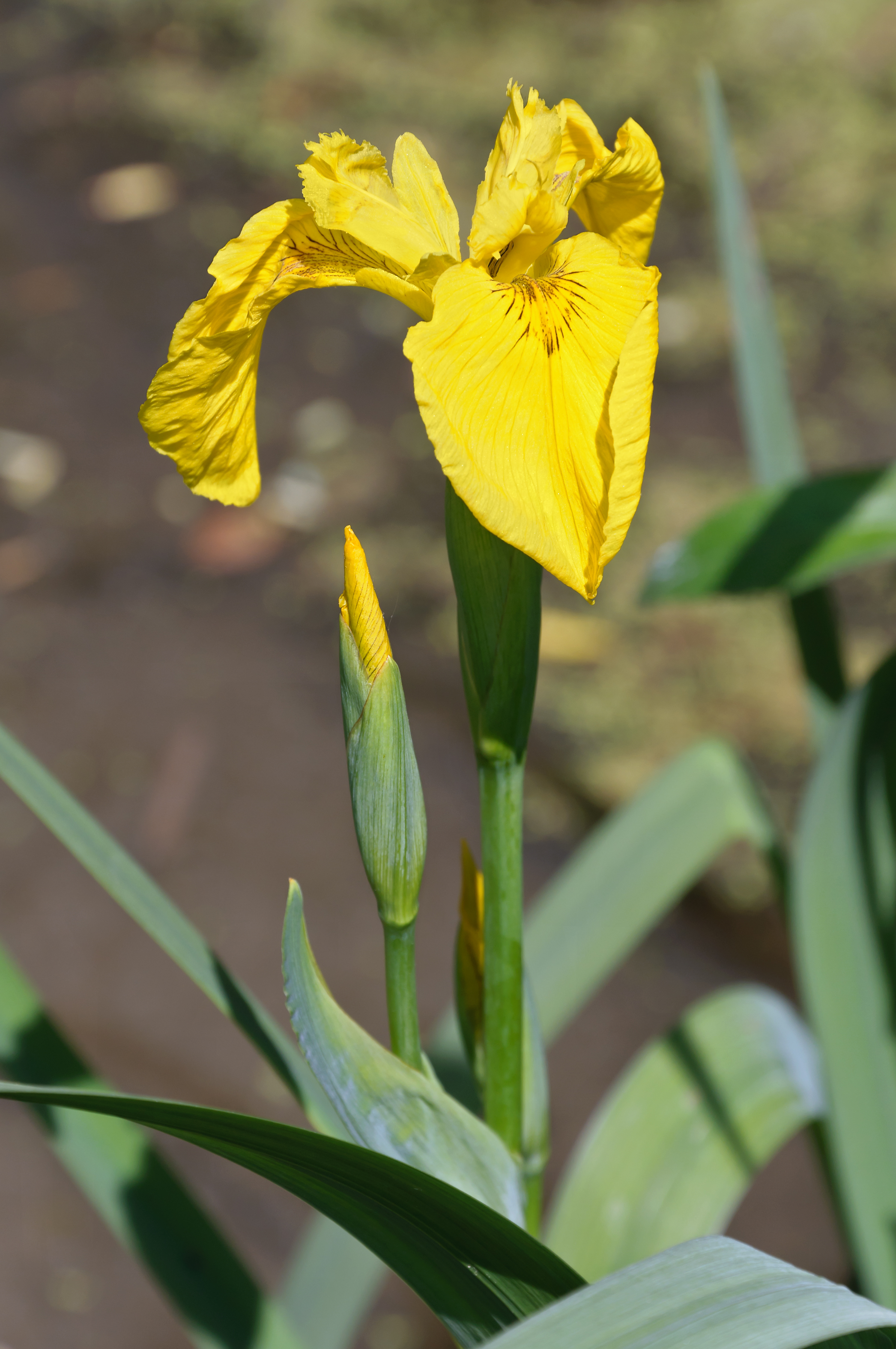
- In France

Conservation status
- Least Concern (IUCN 3.1)

Scientific classification
- Kingdom: Plantae
- Clade: Tracheophytes
- Clade: Angiosperms
- Clade: Monocots
- Order: Asparagales
- Family: Iridaceae
- Genus: Iris
- Subgenus: Iris subg. Limniris
- Section: Iris sect. Limniris
- Series: Iris ser. Laevigatae
- Species: I. pseudacorus

Binomial name
- Iris pseudacorus L., 1753

Synonyms
- List: Acorus adulterinus Ludw. (1755); Iris acoriformis Boreau (1857); Iris acoroides Spach (1846); Iris bastardii Boreau (1857); Iris curtopetala Redouté (1811); Iris flava Tornab. (1887); Iris lutea Ludw. (1755); Iris pallidior Hill (1756); Iris paludosa Pers. (1805); Iris palustris Gaterau (1789); Iris palustris Moench (1794); Iris pseudacorus subsp. acoriformis (Boreau) K.Richt. (1890); Iris pseudacorus subsp. bastardii (Boreau) K.Richt. (1890); Iris sativa Mill. (1768); Limnirion pseudacorus (L.) Opiz (1852); Limniris pseudacorus (L.) Fuss (1866); Moraea candolleana Spreng. (1824); Pseudo-iris palustris Medik. (1790); Vieusseuxia iridioides Redouté (1811); Xiphion acoroides (Spach) Alef. (1863); Xiphion pseudacorus (L.) Schrank (1811); Xyridion acoroideum (Spach) Klatt (1872); Xyridion pseudacorus (L.) Klatt (1872)

= Iris pseudacorus =

West Eurasian species of iris

Iris pseudacorus, the yellow flag, yellow iris, or water flag, is a species of flowering plant in the family Iridaceae. It is native to Europe, western Asia and northwest Africa. Its specific epithet pseudacorus means "false acorus", referring to the similarity of its leaves to those of Acorus calamus (sweet flag), as they have a prominently veined mid-rib and sword-like shape. However, the two plants are not closely related.

== Description ==
This herbaceous flowering perennial plant grows to 100–150 cm (39–59 in), or a rare 2 m (6 ft 7 in) tall, with erect leaves up to 90 cm (35 in) long and 3 cm (1.2 in) broad. The flowers are bright yellow, 7–10 cm (2.8–3.9 in) across, with the typical iris form. The fruit is a dry capsule 4–7 cm (1.6–2.8 in) long, containing numerous pale brown seeds.

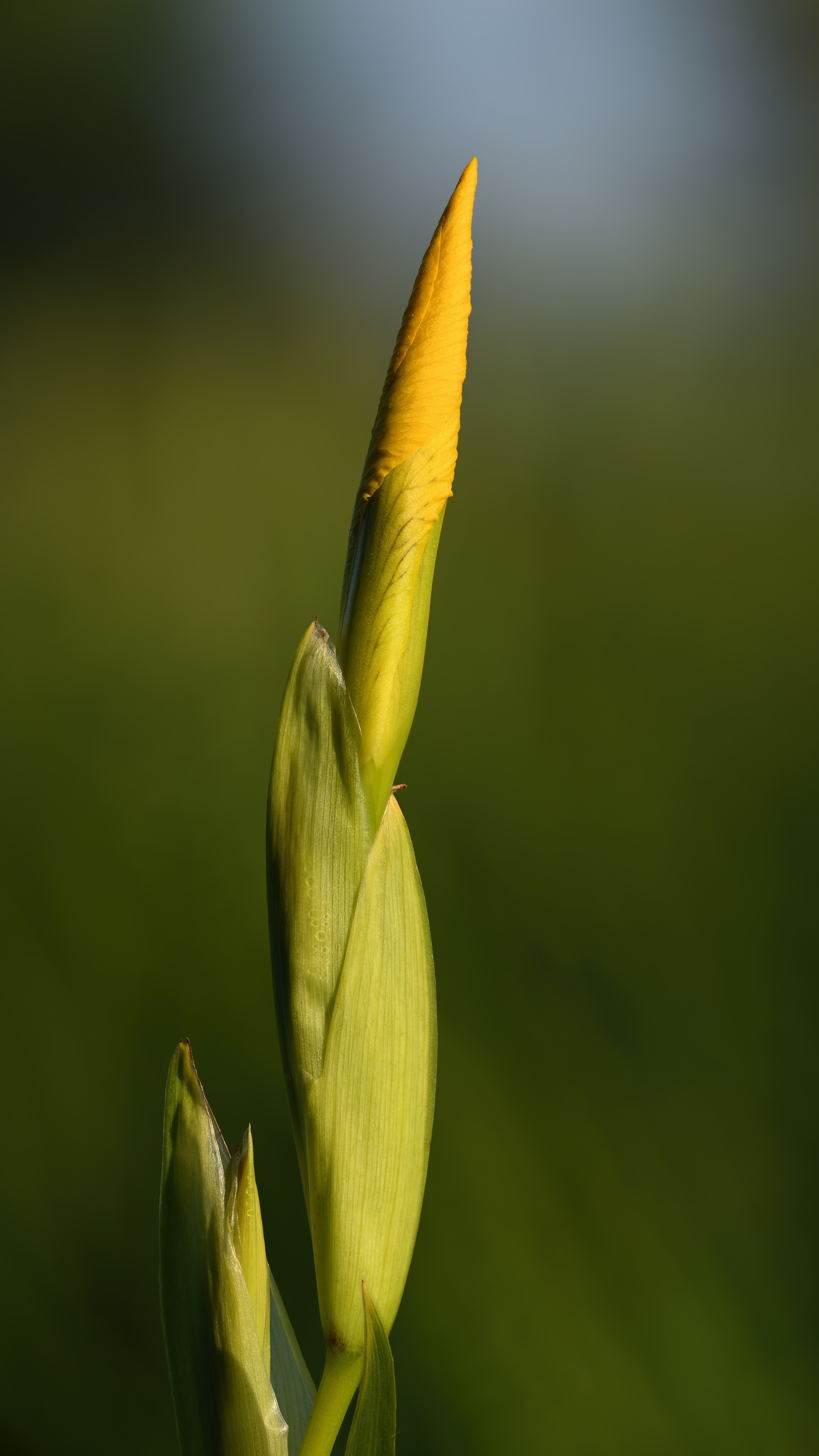
Flower bud

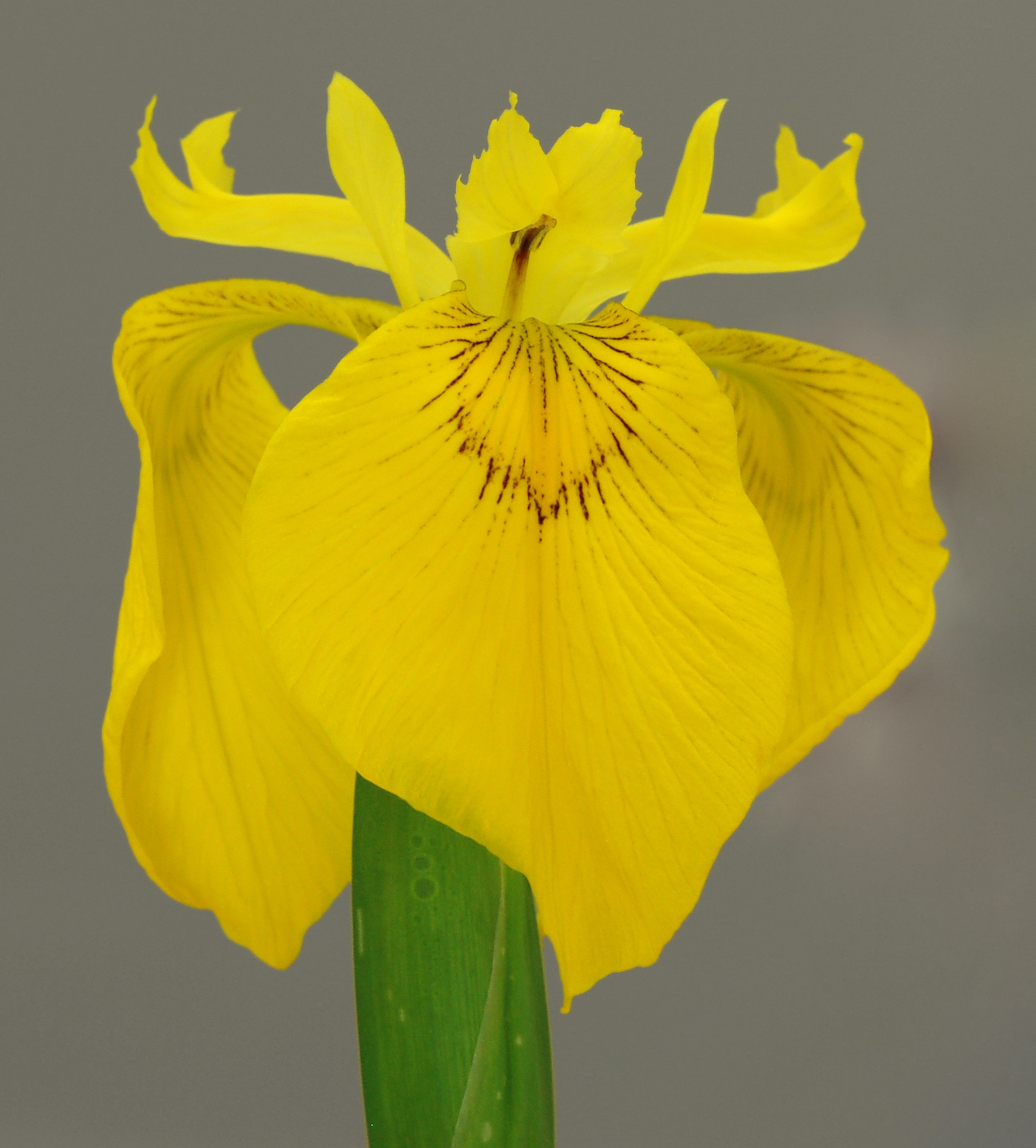
Flower

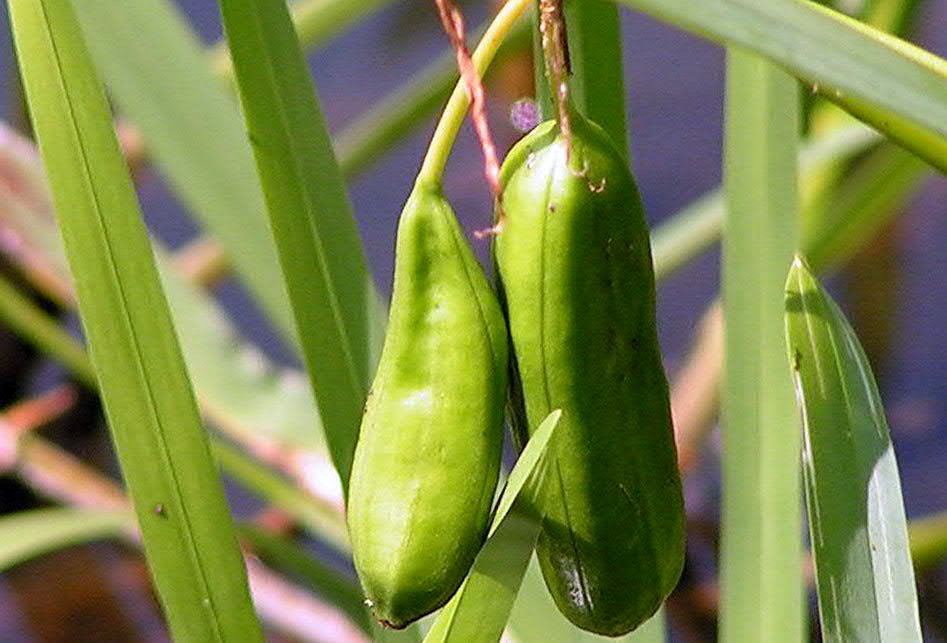
Fruit

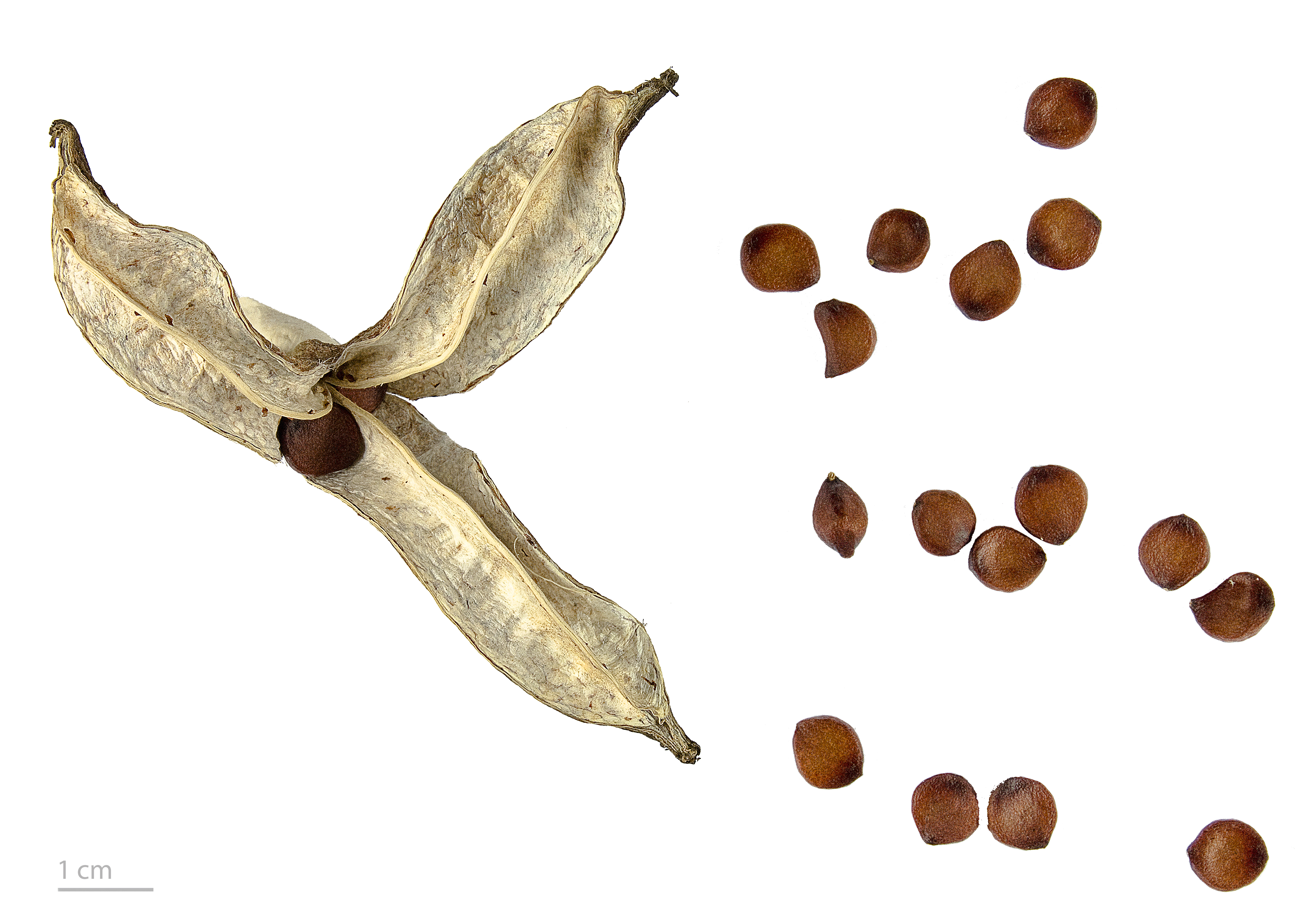
Seeds and seed pod

I. pseudacorus grows best in very wet conditions, and is common in wetlands, where it tolerates submersion, low pH, and anoxic soils. The plant spreads quickly, by both rhizome and water-dispersed seed. It fills a similar niche to that of Typha and often grows with it, though usually in shallower water. While it is primarily an aquatic or marginal plant, the rhizomes can survive prolonged dry conditions.

Large I. pseudacorus stands in western Scotland form a very important feeding and breeding habitat for the endangered corncrake.

I. pseudacorus is one of two iris species native to the United Kingdom, the other being Iris foetidissima (stinking iris).

== Nectar production ==
The plant was rated in second place for per day nectar production per flower in a UK plants survey conducted by the AgriLand project, which is supported by the UK Insect Pollinators Initiative. However, when number of flowers per floral unit, flower abundance, and phenology were taken into account, it dropped out of the top 10 for most nectar per unit cover per year, as did all plants that placed in the top ten, with the exception of common comfrey, Symphytum officinale.

== Cultivation ==
It is widely planted in temperate regions as an ornamental plant, with several cultivars selected for bog garden planting. The following cultivars have gained the Royal Horticultural Society's Award of Garden Merit:

- 'Roy Davidson'
- 'Variegata' (it has leaves that are edged with deep white stripes)

Other cultivars known include Alba (with pale cream flowers) and Golden Fleece (with dark yellow flowers).

== Invasive species ==
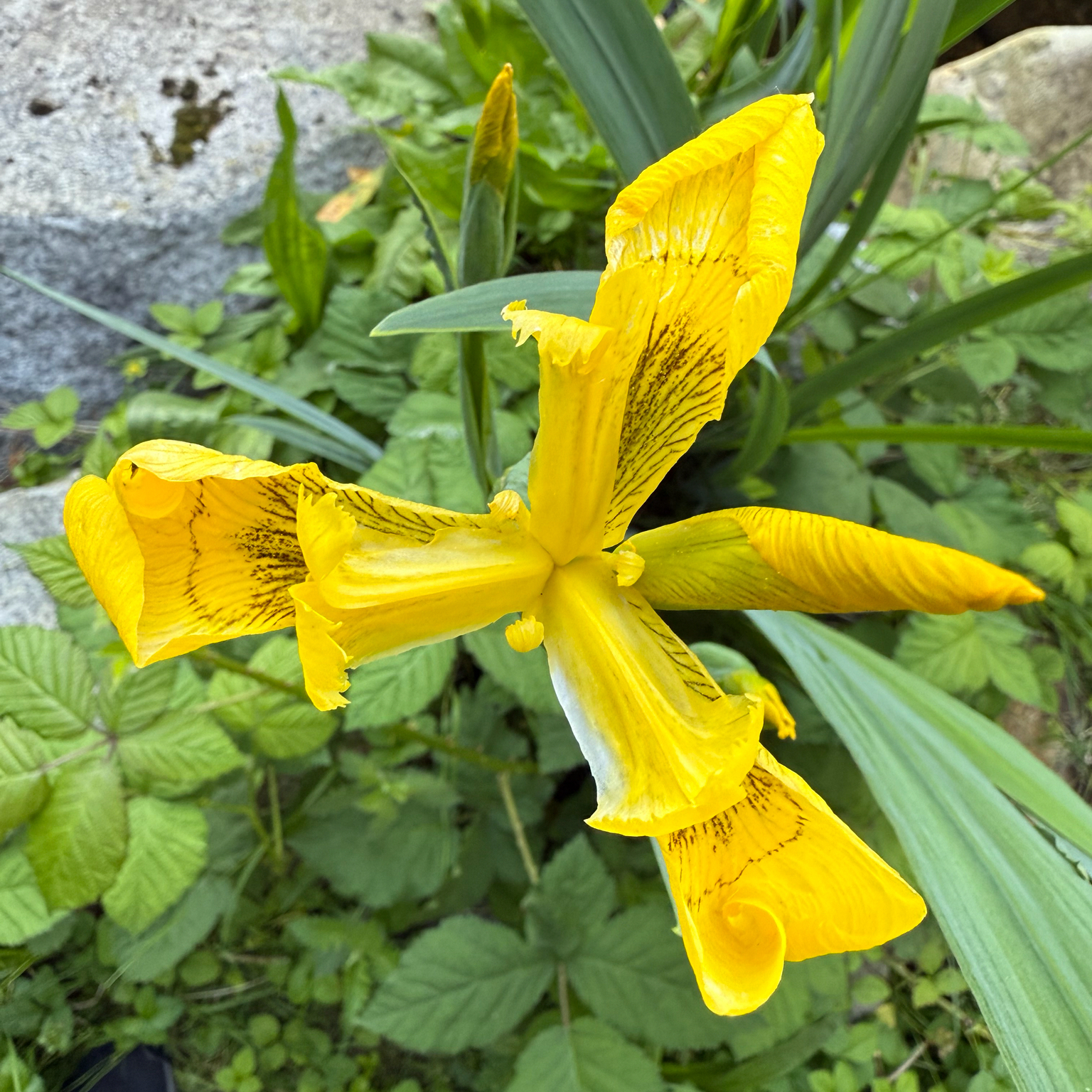
Introduced, in British Columbia

In some regions (including the US and South Africa) where it is not native, it has escaped from cultivation to establish itself as an invasive aquatic plant which can create dense, monotypic stands, outcompeting other plants in the ecosystem. Where it is invasive, it is tough to remove on a large scale. Even ploughing the rhizomes is often ineffective. It has been banned in some areas but is still widely sold in others for use in gardens.

Iris pseudacorus is reported as invasive in Connecticut, Delaware, Maryland, New Hampshire, New Jersey, North Carolina, Oregon, Tennessee, Virginia, Vermont, Washington, Wisconsin, and West Virginia.

US Spread
State/Province	First Observed
IL	2009
IN	1982
MI	1932
MN	2008
NY	1882
OH	2013
PA	1954
VT	1909
WI	2005

== Relationship to fleur-de-lis ==
According to Pierre Augustin Boissier de Sauvages, an 18th-century French naturalist and lexicographer, the name fleur-de-lis applied to the heraldic symbol may be related to Iris pseudacorus rather than to a lily, based on the shape and yellow colour of the flower.

== Toxicity and uses ==
The plant's roots and leaves are toxic.

This plant has been used as a form of water treatment since it can take up macronutrients (such as nitrogen and phosphorus) through its roots, and is featured in many AS Level Biology practicals as its ability to grow in low pH levels makes it a useful indicator.

It can also withstand high salinity levels in the water.

== Gallery ==
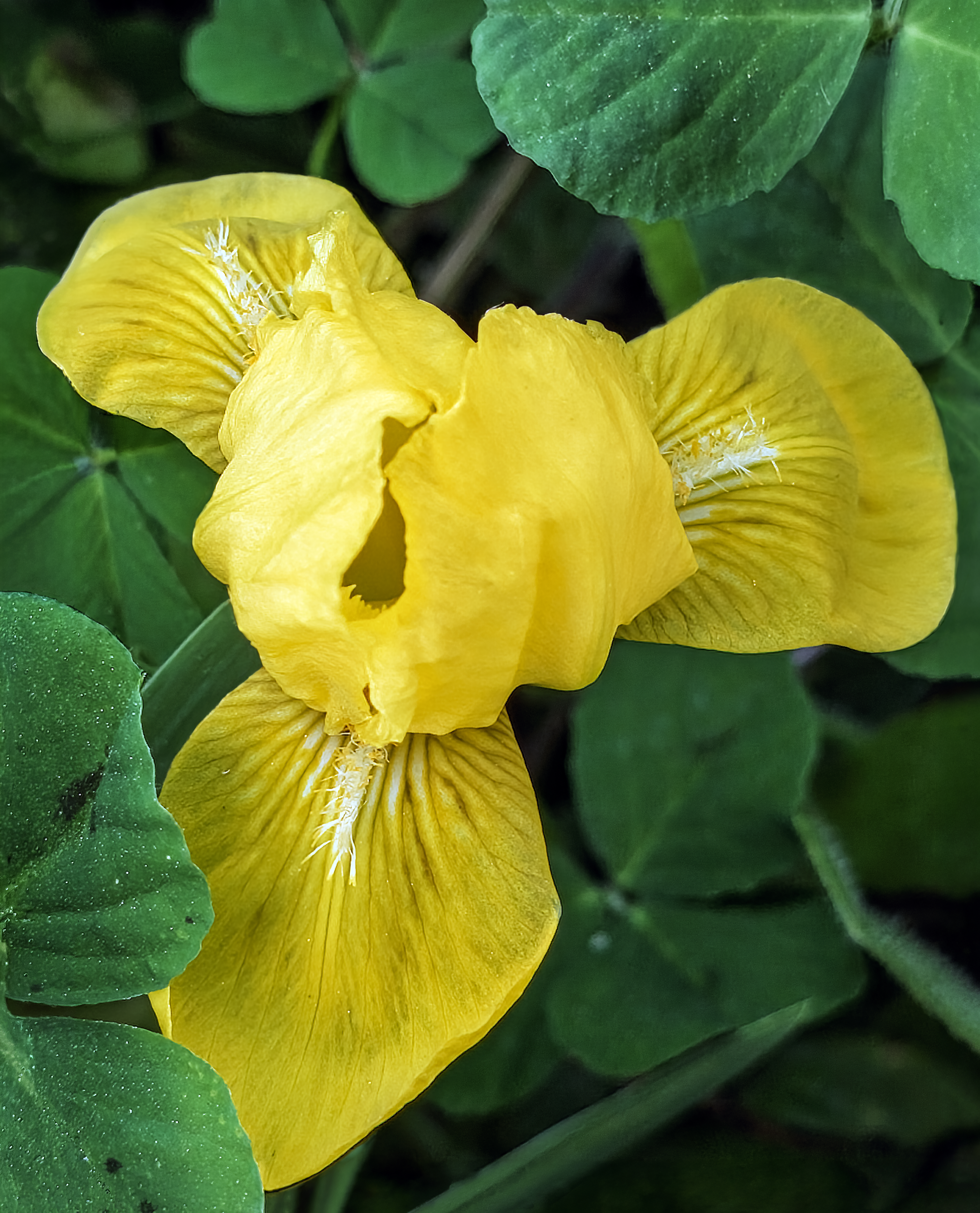
Immature flower

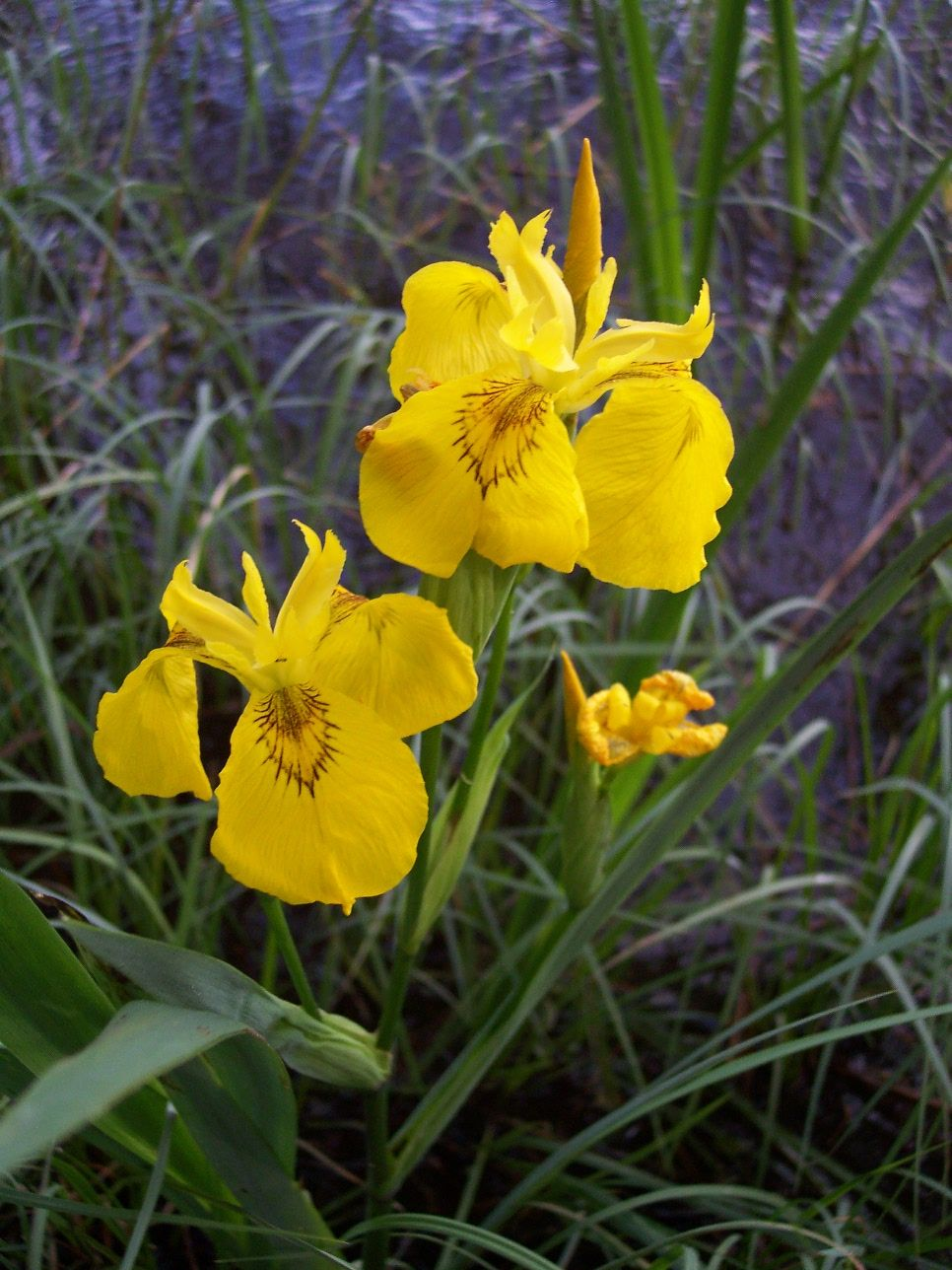

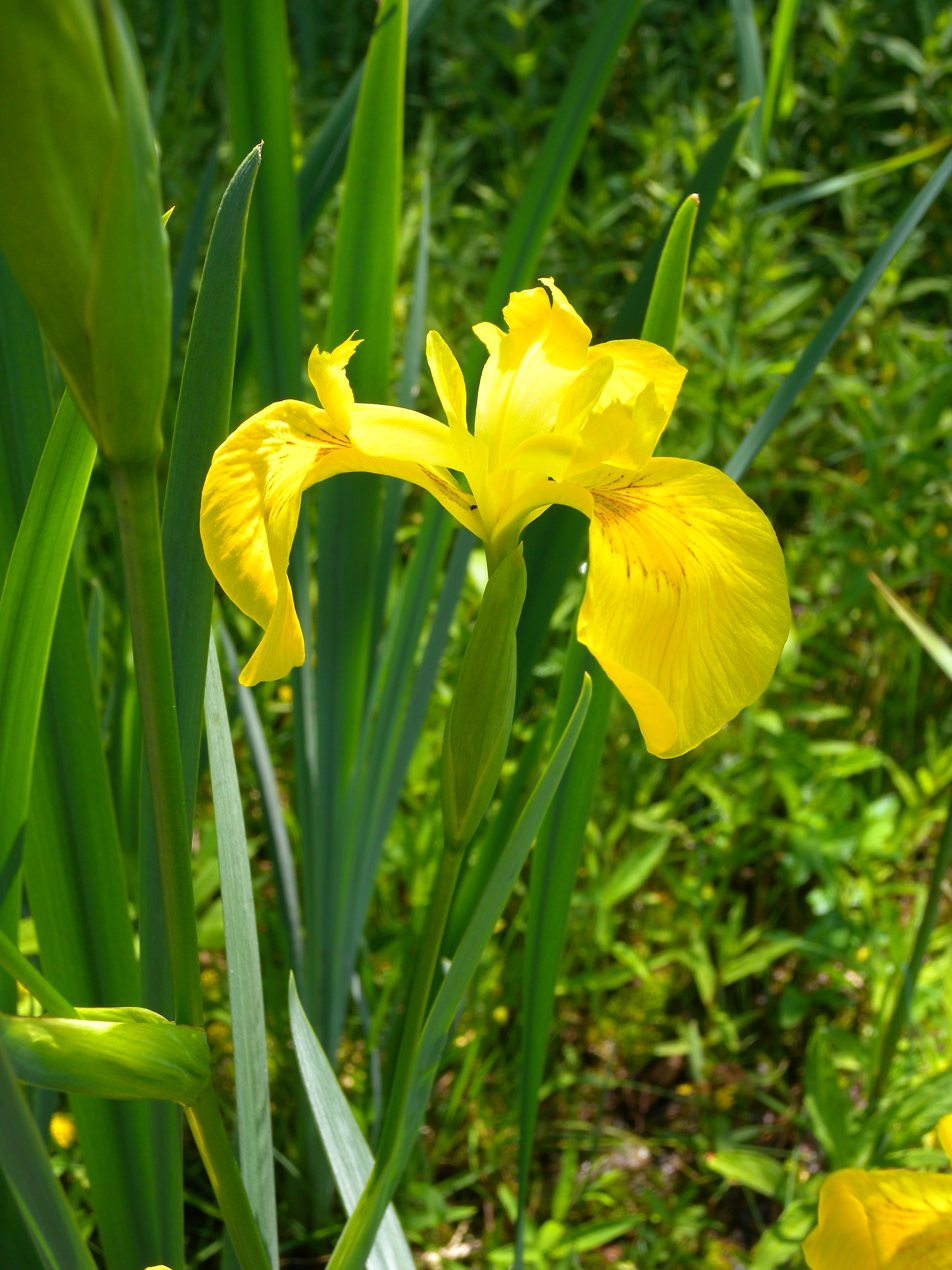

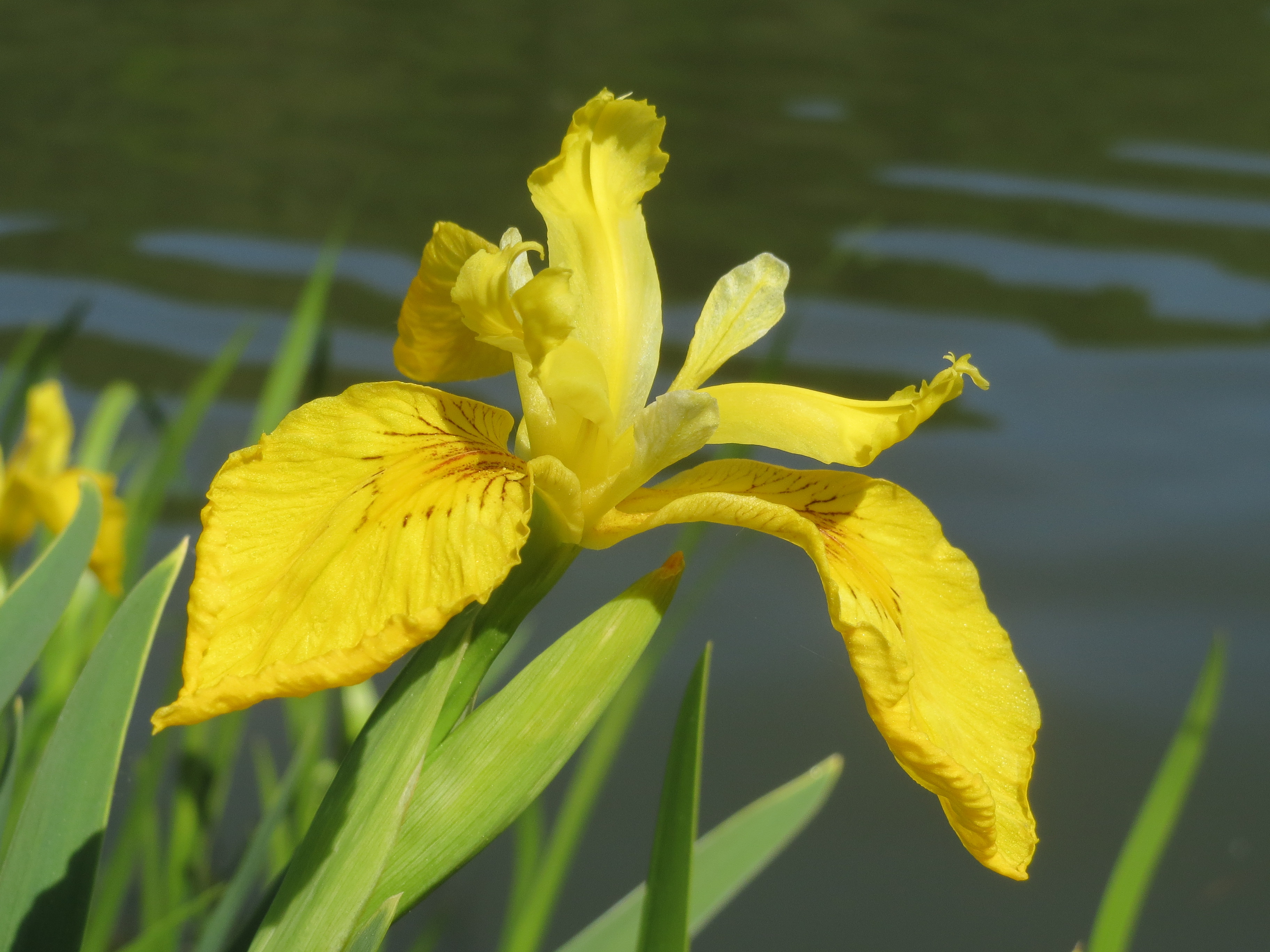
Flower

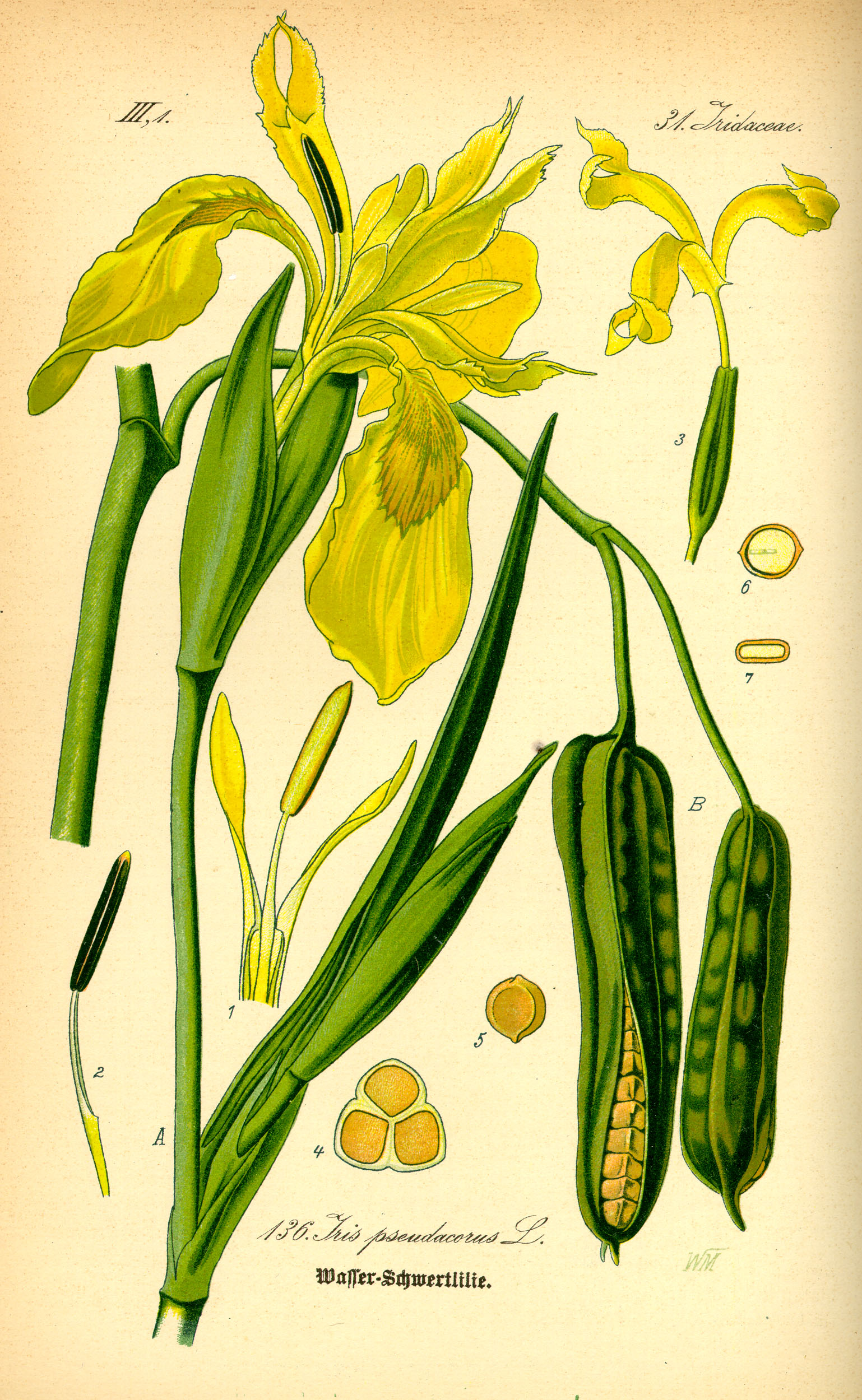
Iris pseudacorus

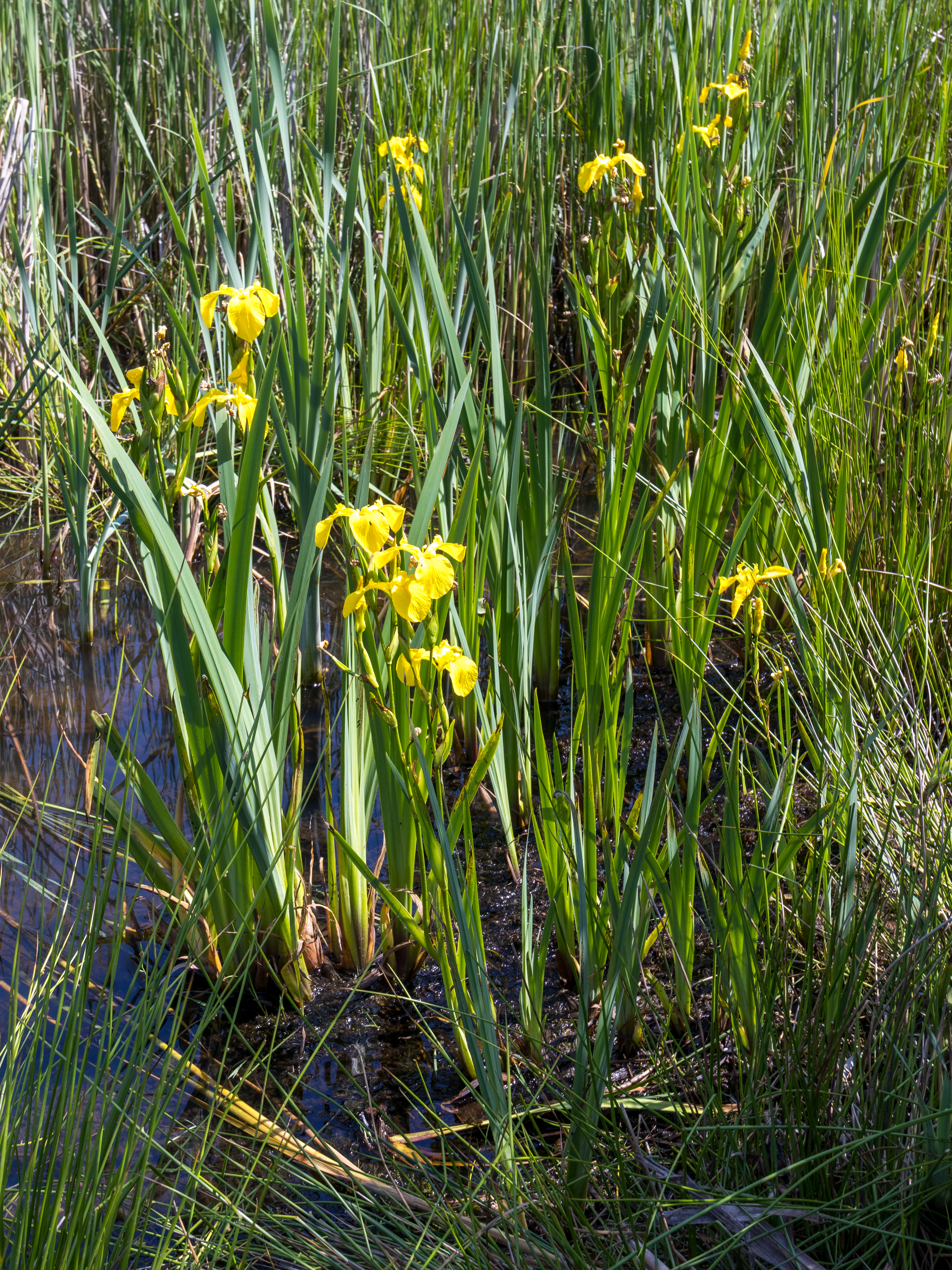
Habitus

== See also ==
- Flag of the Brussels-Capital Region
- Fleur-de-lis
- Iris sawfly
