= Fladda, Treshnish Isles =

Island in Scotland

Fladda
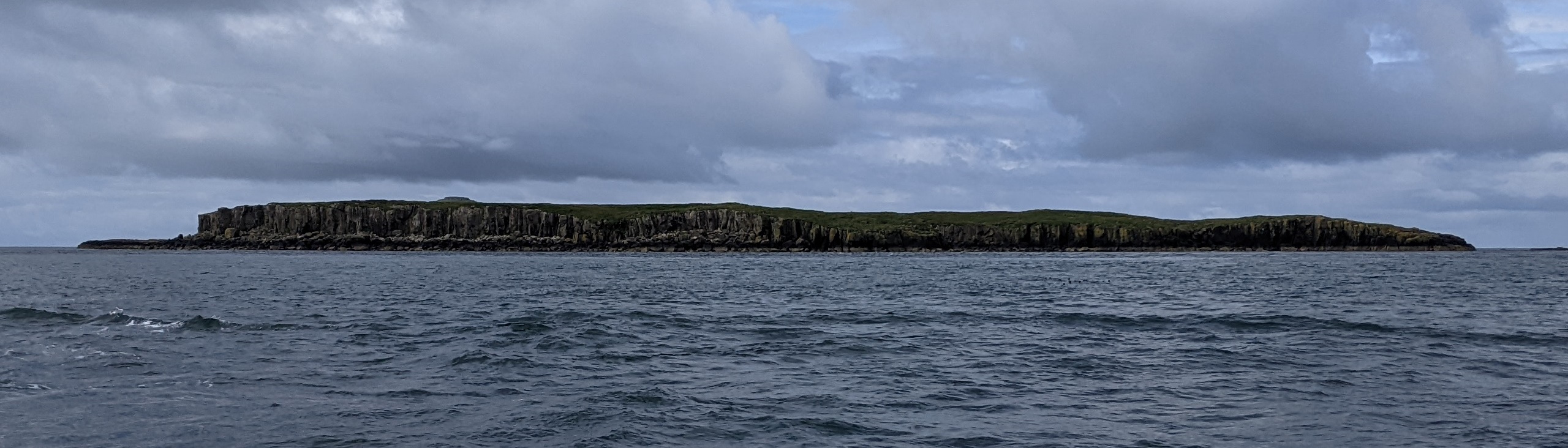
- Fladda seen from the north-east

Location
- Fladda shown relative to Mull
- OS grid reference: NM298438
- Coordinates: 56.51°N 6.39°W

Name
- Name meaning: "flat island"
- Old Norse name: Flat-ey

Physical geography
- Island group: Treshnish Isles
- Area: 26 ha
- Highest elevation: 26 m (85 ft)

Administration
- Council area: Argyll and Bute
- Country: Scotland
- Sovereign state: United Kingdom

Demographics
- Population: 0

Fladda is the northernmost of the Treshnish Isles. Its name comes from the Old Norse Flat-ey meaning "flat island". Fladda is owned by the Hebridean Trust.

== Archaeology ==
Fladda's archaeology is recorded by the Royal Commission on the Ancient and Historical Monuments of Scotland. It refers to a building and mounds which may be the site of an early Christian chapel and burial ground. It notes the similarity to finds on Colonsay.

== In literature ==
Fladda is mentioned in Frank Fraser Darling's book Island Years. He lived on the neighbouring island of Lunga with his wife and son while carrying out research. Darling notes that Fladda was the site of the summer home of the Robertsons, who at that time had been fishing lobsters around the Treshnish Isles for three generations.
