= Treshnish Isles =

Archipelago in the Inner Hebrides, Scotland

Eileanan Treisinis (Gaelic)

Location
- The Treshnish Isles shown relative to Mull
- OS grid reference: NM278419
- Coordinates: 56.49°N 6.42°W

Name
- Name meaning: unknown

Physical geography
- Island group: Mull
- Area: 128 ha (316 acres)
- Highest elevation: Cruachan, on Lunga 103 m (338 ft)

Administration
- Council area: Argyll and Bute
- Country: Scotland
- Sovereign state: United Kingdom

Demographics
- Population: 0

The Treshnish Isles are an archipelago of small islands and skerries, lying west of the Isle of Mull, in Scotland. They are part of the Inner Hebrides. Trips to the Treshnish Isles operate from Ulva Ferry, Tobermory, Ardnamurchan and Tiree.

== Geography ==
The archipelago extends over a distance of roughly 7 kilometres (4 mi), from the island of Bac Beag in the south (towards Cairn na Burgh Beag) to the north-east. The largest island in the group, Lunga, is 7 kilometres (4 mi) west of Gometra, 6 kilometres (4 mi) south-west of Rubha' a' Chaoil (on the Isle of Mull), 12 kilometres (7 mi) south-east of Coll, and 5 kilometres (3 mi) north-west of Staffa.

Other relatively large islands in the group are Cairn na Burgh Mòr, Fladda and Bac Mòr. There are numerous small skerries, particularly north of Lunga. All the islands are of volcanic origin.

Island	Gaelic name	Area (ha)	Highest point (m)
Bac Beag	Am Baca Beag	6.7	27
Bac Mòr	Am Baca Mòr	24.7	86
Lunga	Lunga	59.9	103
Sgeir a' Chaisteil	Sgeir a' Chaisteil	3.7	26
Sgeir an Eirionnaich	Sgeir an Eirionnaich	5	15
Fladda	Flada	20.6	26
Cairn na Burgh Mòr	Cairn Bhuirg Mòr	3.6	35
Cairn na Burgh Beag	Cairn Bhuirg Beag	2.2	22

== History ==
There are several possible duns on the islands of Iron Age origin. Little is known of the early history, although these prominent landmarks would have been significant waypoints for the Norse settlers during their conquest in the early years of the Kingdom of the Isles, which lasted from the 9th to the 13th centuries. There are remains on Lunga of a village of blackhouses abandoned in 1857.

Cairn na Burgh Mòr has the remains of a fort, on the site of an earlier Norse building, thought to have belonged to the chief of Clan MacDougall. Until 1354, it marked the division between the "Nordreys", the northern isles, and the "Sudreys", or southern isles. The smaller island of Cairn na Burgh Beag has the ruins of a fort occupied by the MacLeans of Duart during the Jacobite rising of 1715.

The Isles were purchased in 1938 by explorer and naturalist Col. Niall Rankin and they were sold to the Hebridean Trust in 2000. The Trust are guardians of the islands to protect them and the wildlife and to monitor and study the ecology and archaeology. In June 2023, the islands were placed under the protection of the National Trust for Scotland, allowing the Hebridean Trust to concentrate on community projects on Tiree.

Due to the beauty and remoteness of the Isles and the abundance of wildlife, particularly the puffins, they are very popular with tourists who visit by boat, generally to Lunga, for day-trips during the summer.

== Etymology ==
Treisinis is a Gaelic name of unknown meaning that includes the Old Norse root ness, meaning 'headland'.

Bac Mòr is also known as "The Dutchman's Cap" in English due to its shape. Bac Beag is from the Gaelic Am Baca Beag, with Bac meaning 'bank' or 'dune' and Beag simply being a diminutive in contrast to Mòr. Bac Mòr is also known as Baca Rois in Gaelic, which means 'dune of the Ross' and is a reference to the shape of the island when framed against the Ross of Mull. Lunga is probably from the Old Norse lungr-øy, meaning 'longship island'. Sgeir an Eirionnaich and Sgeir a' Chaisteil are Gaelic names meaning 'Irishman's skerry' and 'castle skerry' respectively. Cairn na Burgh Mòr means 'cairn of the large fort' and Cairn na Burgh Beg is thus 'cairn of the small fort'.

The name Fladda originates from the Old Norse for 'flat island'.

== Natural history and conservation ==
The Treshnish Isles are part of the Loch na Keal National Scenic Area, one of 40 in Scotland. They are also designated as a Site of Special Scientific Interest, a Special Protection Area due to their importance for breeding seabirds and a marine Special Area of Conservation. They are also known for their Atlantic grey seals and ruined castles.

The Treshnish Isles from above Port Haunn on Mull. Nearest are Cairn na Burgh Beag and Cairn na Burgh Mòr. Behind are the low flat island of Fladda and the tallest island, Lunga, which obscures Bac Mòr and Bac Beag beyond.	The Treshnish Isles from the east as seen from Loch Tuath. From left to right: (Ellean Dioghlum), Bac Mòr, Lunga, Fladda, Cairn na Burgh Mòr, Cairn na Burgh Beag.

== See also ==
- List of islands of Scotland
