= Lunga, Treshnish Isles =

Island in Scotland

Lunga
Lunga (Gaelic)
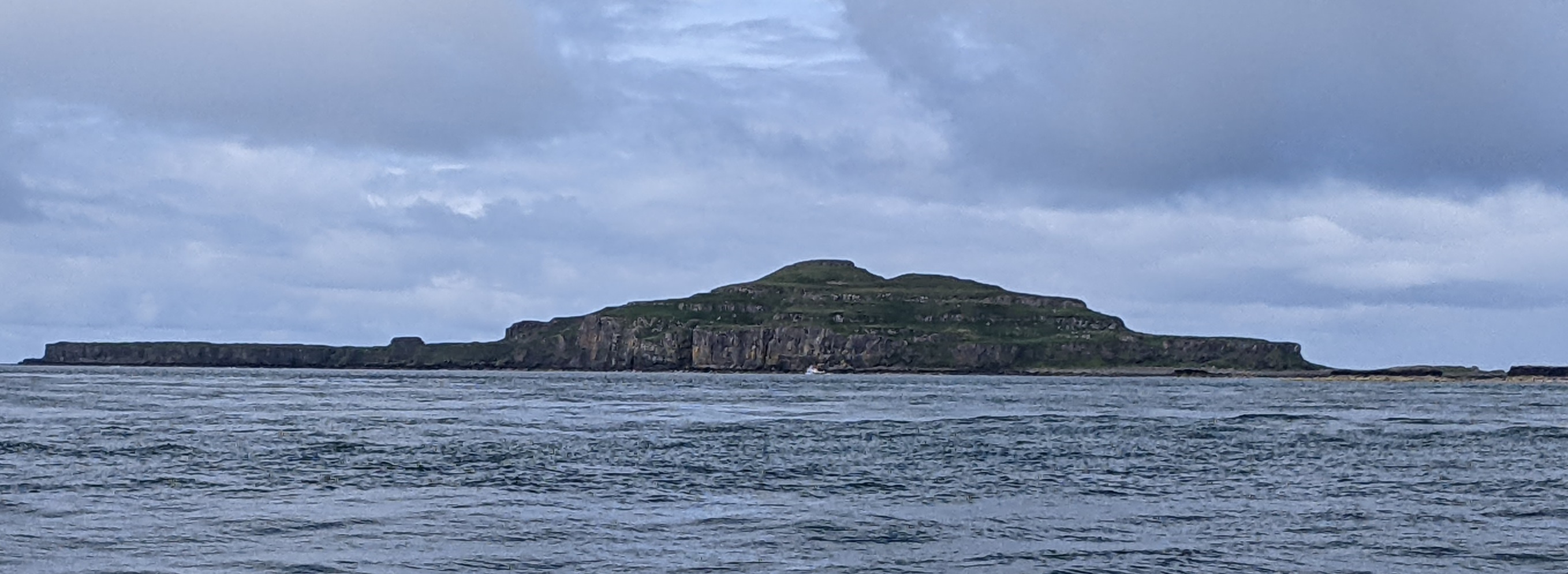
- Lunga viewed from across the water

Location
- Lunga shown relative to Mull
- OS grid reference: NM278419
- Coordinates: 56.49°N 6.42°W

Name
- Name meaning: "(long)ship island", from Norse
- Old Norse name: langr-øy

Physical geography
- Island group: Treshnish Isles
- Area: 81 ha (3/8 sq mi)
- Area rank: 161
- Highest elevation: Cruachan, 103 m (338 ft)

Administration
- Council area: Argyll and Bute
- Country: Scotland
- Sovereign state: United Kingdom

Demographics
- Population: 0

The island of Lunga is the largest of the Treshnish Isles in Argyll and Bute, Scotland. The Isles are part of the Loch Na Keal National Scenic Area.

== History ==
Lunga, which is of volcanic origin, has been described as 'a green jewel in a peacock sea'. It was inhabited until the 19th century, and still bears the remains of blackhouses. The remains of the ruined village, abandoned in 1857, lie in the northeastern part of the island.

== Wildlife ==
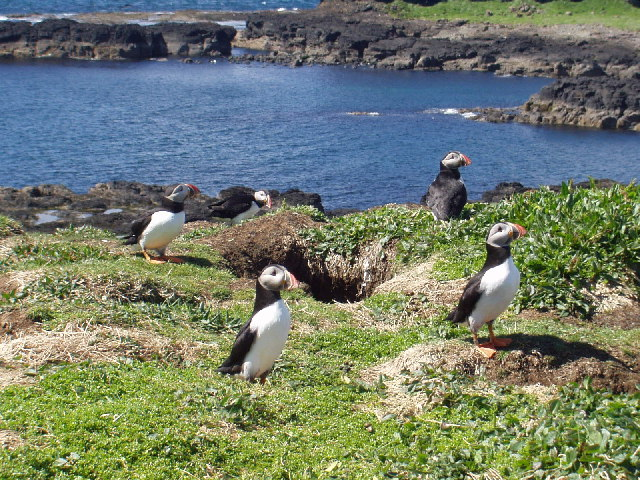
Puffins on Lunga.

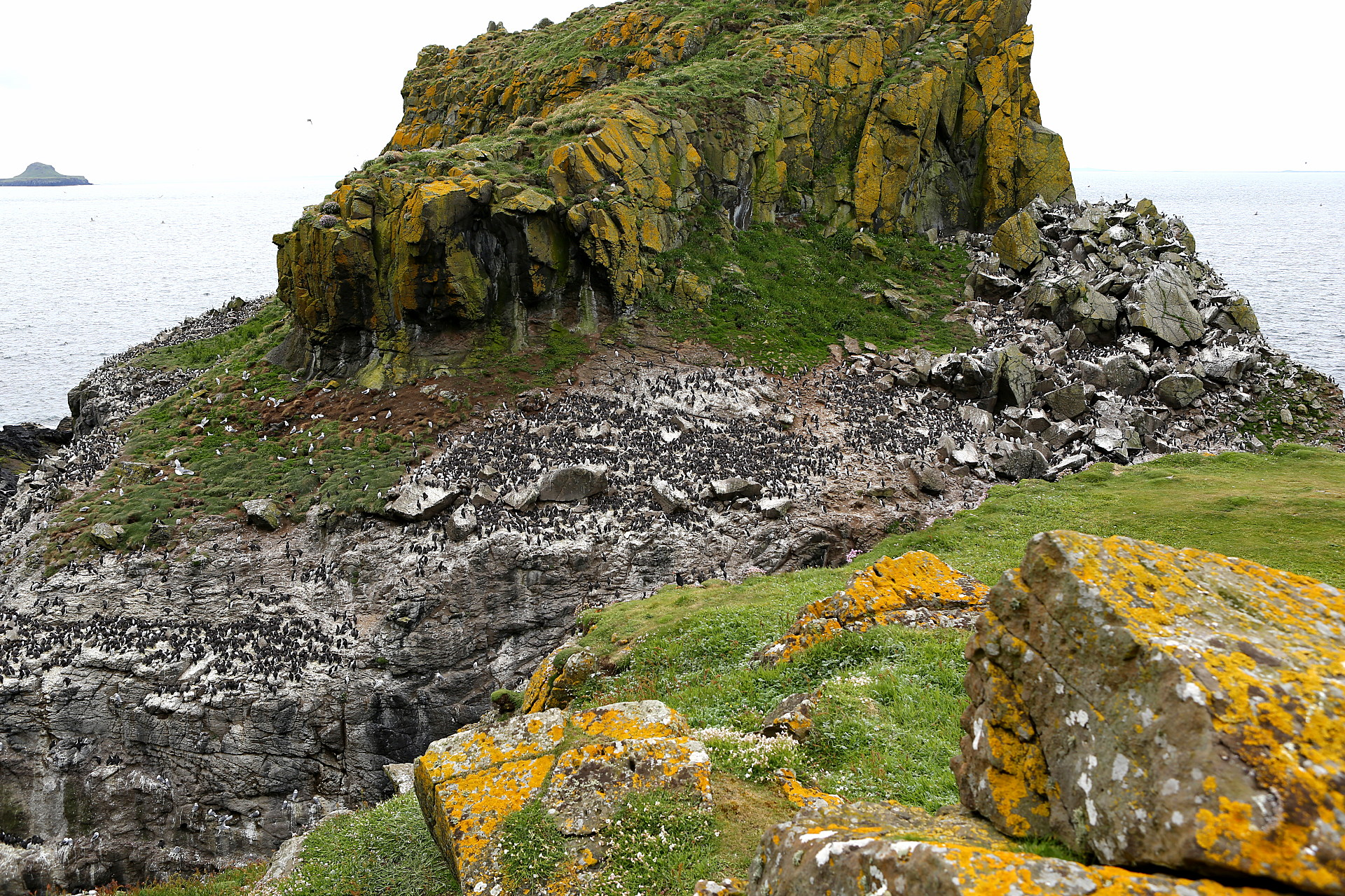
Seabirds on Harp Rock, Lunga, Treshnish Isles

As one of the Treshnish Isles, Lunga is a designated Site of Special Scientific Interest, Special Protection Area and Special Area of Conservation. These designations reflect the importance of the island for its marine life, including the grey seals that inhabit the waters around it, and for its breeding colonies of seabirds, including storm-petrels, kittiwakes, Manx shearwaters, guillemot, puffin, European shag and razorbills. (The birds also breed on the Harp Rock, a sea stack separated from Lunga by a narrow gut.) In addition, barnacle geese winter on the island.

Many rare and endangered plants are also native to Lunga, including primrose, birdsfoot trefoil, orchids, sea campion, sea thrift, sea pinks, yellow flags, tormentil and oyster plant.

In summer, tourist boats visit Lunga from Ulva Ferry, Tiree, Tobermory, Iona and Ardnamurchan. The island's thousands of breeding puffins, who allow visitors to approach to within a few feet of them, are the island's main attraction.

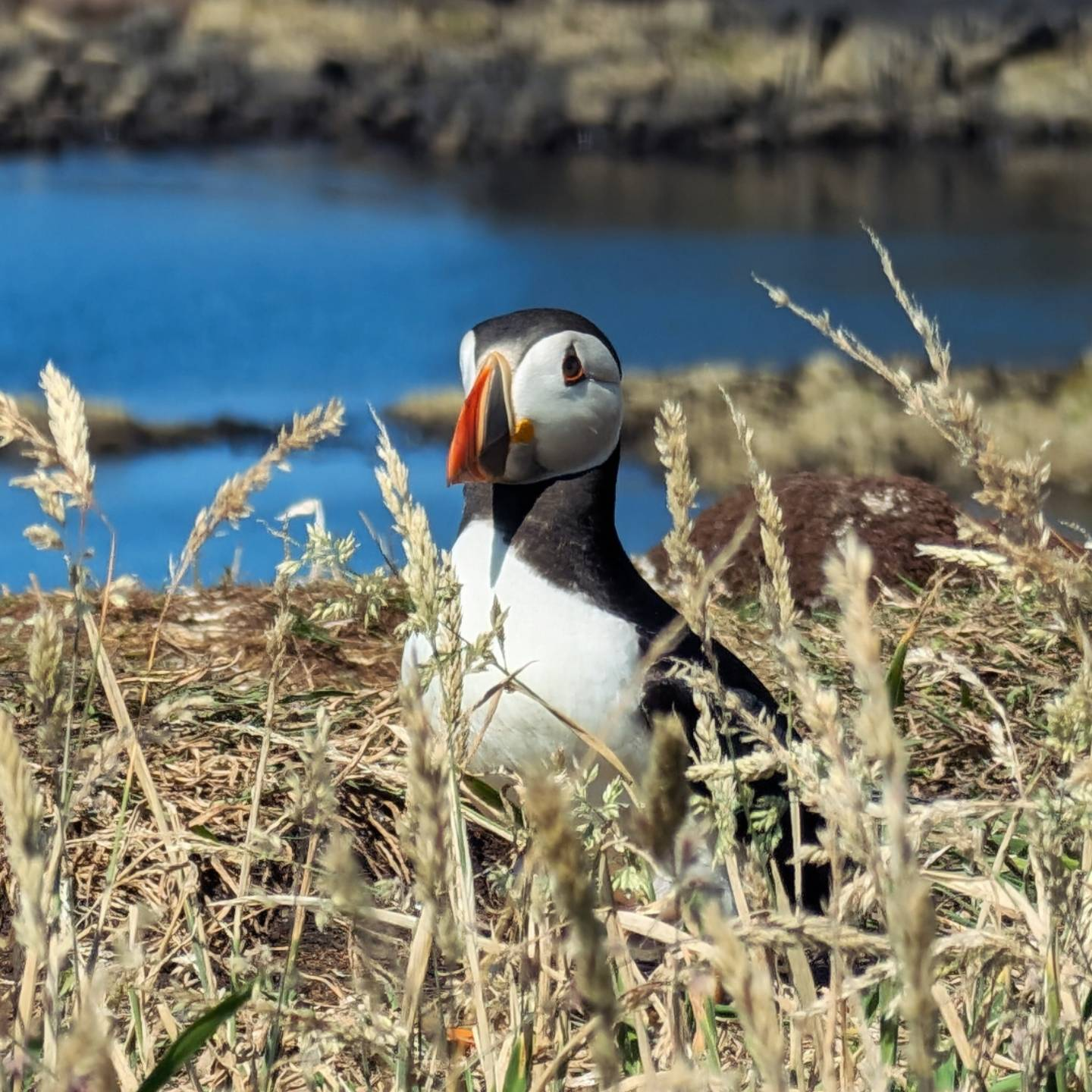
A Puffin sitting side on to camera, on the cliff top where its nest is.
