= Chiefs of Clan Maclean =

The current chief of the Highland, Scottish clan, Clan Maclean is Sir Lachlan Hector Charles Maclean of Duart and Morvern Bt, CVO, Deputy Lord Lieutenant of Argyll and Bute, 28th clan chief and 12th Baronet of Morvern. The seat of the chiefs of Clan MacLean is Duart Castle on the Isle of Mull. Duart was given to Lachlan Lubanach Maclean as part of his wife's dowry.

The following is a list of the previous chiefs of the Clan Maclean.

Name	Dates and Notes	Designation
Sir Charles Maclean, KT, KBE, GCVO, 27th clan chief. Created Lord Maclean (Life Peer) in 1970.	b. 1916 – d. 1990. Lord Chamberlain of Her Majesty's Household; Lord Lieutenant of Argyll; Chief Scout of the British Commonwealth.	11th Baronet Morvern
Sir Fitzroy Maclean, CB, KCB of Duart and Morvern, 26th clan chief	b. 1835 – d. 1936; survivor of the Charge of the Light Brigade.	10th Baronet Morvern; Companion of the Order of the Bath (Civil) in 1897; Knight Commander of the Order of the Bath (Civil) in 1904
Sir Charles Maclean, 25th clan chief	b. 1847 – d. 1883	9th Baronet Morvern
Sir Fitzroy Maclean 24th clan chief	b. 1818 – d. 1847	8th Baronet Morvern
Sir Hector Maclean 23rd clan chief	b. 1783 – d. 1818	7th Baronet Morvern
Sir Allan Maclean, 22nd clan chief	b. 1750 – d. 1783	6th Baronet Morvern
Sir Hector Maclean, 21st clan chief	b. 1716 – d. 1750	5th Baronet Morvern
Sir John Maclean 20th clan chief	b. 1674 d. 1716. Fought at the Battle of Killiecrankie.	4th Baronet Morvern 1st Lord Maclean in the Jacobite Peerage
Sir Allan Maclean 19th clan chief	b. 1651 – d. 1674.	3rd Baronet Morvern
Sir Hector Maclean, 18th clan chief	b. 1649 – d. 1651. Killed at the Battle of Inverkeithing.	2nd Baronet Morvern
Sir Lachlan Maclean, 17th clan chief	b. 1626 – d. 1649. Fought as a royalist under Montrose at the Battles of Inverlochy, Auldearn and Kilsyth.	1st Baronet Morvern (creation of 1631)
Hector Mor Maclean of Dowart, 16th clan chief	b.? – d. 1626	
Hector Og Maclean, 15th clan chief	b. 1583 – d. 1623	Hector the Younger, 11th Laird of Duart
Sir Lachlan Mor Maclean, 14th clan chief	b. 1558 – d. 5 August 1598. Killed at the Battle of Traigh Ghruinneart.	10th Laird of Duart
Hector Og Maclean, 13th clan chief	b.1529 – d.?	Hector the Younger, 9th Laird of Duart
Hector Mor Maclean, 12th clan chief	b. 1497 – d. 1568. He was kidnapped, with many other Chiefs at a dinner on board ship off Aros Castle. They were taken south to Edinburgh, where they were forced to agree to the terms of the Statutes of Iona, under which they lost much of their sovereignty over the islands. Hector himself was only released when he agreed to the destruction of all his ships.	Hector the Great, 8th Laird of Duart
Lachlan Cattanach Maclean, 11th clan chief	b.1473 – d. 1523. Murdered.	Lachlan the Hairy, 7th Laird of Duart
Lachlan Maclean, 10th clan chief	b.1450 – d.?	6th Laird of Duart
Hector Odhar Maclean, 9th clan chief	b.1428 – d. 1496.	Hector the Sallow, 5th Laird of Duart
Lachlan Og Maclean, 8th Chief	b.1405 – d.?	Lachlan the Younger, 4th Laird of Duart
Lachlan Bronneach Maclean, 7th clan chief	b.1379 – d.?	Lachlan the Fat-bellied, 3rd Laird of Duart
Eachuinn Ruadh nan cath Maclean, 6th clan chief	b.1354 – d.1411. Commanded the right flank of the Lord of the Isles' army at the Battle of Harlaw and was killed in a duel with Alexander Irvine who was also killed	Red Hector of the Battles, 2nd Laird of Duart
Lachlan Lubanach Maclean of Duart, 5th clan chief	b.1325 – d.? Duart Castle on the Isle of Mull was part of his wife's dowry.	Lachlan the Cunning, 1st Laird of Duart
Iain Dubh Macgilliemore Maclean of Morvern, 4th clan chief	b.1297 – d.?	Black John, the son of Gillechaluim
Maolcaluim macGiliosa Maclean, 3rd clan chief	b.1271 – d.?	
Malise mac Gilleain, AKA: Gillemor Macilean, 2nd clan chief	b.1245 – d.?	Malise, the son of Gillean
Gilleain na Tuaighe, 1st clan chief	b. 1211 – d.?	Gillean of the Battleaxe
