= Lachlan Maclean =

Lachlan Maclean may refer to:

- Lachlan Lubanach Maclean (c.1350–c.1405), 5th Clan Chief of Clan Maclean
- Lachlan Bronneach Maclean (fl. 1470s), 7th Clan Chief of Clan Maclean
- Lachlan Og Maclean (c. 1432–1484), 8th Clan Chief of Clan Maclean
- Lachlan Maclean, 10th Chief of Clan Maclean (fl. 1510s)
- Lachlan Cattanach Maclean, 11th Chief (c. 1465–1523), 11th Clan Chief of Clan Maclean
- Sir Lachlan Mor Maclean (1558–1598), 14th Clan Chief of Clan Maclean
- Sir Lachlan Maclean, 1st Baronet (c. 1620–1649), 17th Clan Chief of Clan Maclean
- Sir Lachlan Maclean, 12th Baronet (born 1942), 28th Clan Chief of Clan Maclean
- Lachlan Maclean, 6th Laird of Coll
- Lachlan Maclean, 3rd Laird of Torloisk, 17th-century Scottish nobleman
- Lauchlan Maclean, 2nd Laird of Brolas (1650–1687)

== See also ==
- Lachlan McLean (disambiguation)
