= Battle of the Western Isles =

Series of conflicts in Scotland 1585–1586

Coordinates: 55.955°N 5.901°W

- Part of Clan Maclean and Clan MacDonald feud
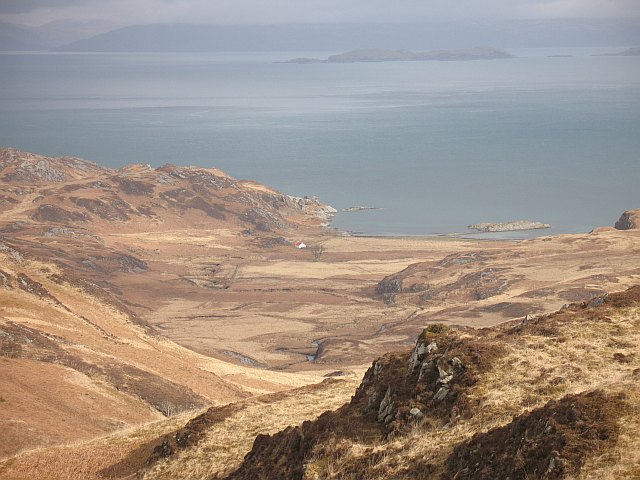
- Glen Garrisdale, the former stronghold of the MacLeans of Jura
Date	1585–86
Location	Western Isles, Scotland
Result	Act of Parliament was passed to obtain peace

Belligerents
Clan Maclean	Clan Macdonald of Sleat; Clan MacDonald of Dunnyveg

Commanders and leaders
Lachlan Mor Maclean	Donald Gorm Mor of Sleat; Angus MacDonald of Islay

The Battle of the Western Isles was a series of conflicts in 1585 and 1586 on the islands of Jura, Islay, Mull and Tiree, Scotland as well as the peninsula of Kintyre on the mainland. However, although the historic sources describe this as having taken place in the "Western Isles" which are now known as the Outer Hebrides, all of the aforementioned locations are actually in the Inner Hebrides. It was fought between the Clan Macdonald of Sleat and Clan MacDonald of Dunnyveg against the Clan Maclean. In 1585, the Macleans slaughtered a party of the MacDonalds of Sleat when they were mistakenly accused of stealing cattle and the MacDonalds of Sleat and Dunnyveg retaliated. James VI of Scotland intervened but the conflicts continued into 1586. After further intervention an act of Parliament was passed which would levy fines on any clan chiefs who did not maintain peace and good order among their vassals.

== The conflict on Jura ==
In the summer of 1585, Donald Gorm Mor of Sleat, chief of the Clan Macdonald of Sleat, along with a large following of men, left the Isle of Skye to pay a visit to Angus MacDonald of Islay, chief of the Clan MacDonald of Dunnyveg. However, because of a severe storm he was forced to seek shelter on the north of the Isle of Jura, which part belonged to Lachlan Mor Maclean, chief of Clan Maclean, who was seated at Duart Castle on the Isle of Mull. Another party, which included Hugh, son of Archibald the Clerk and a Macdonald descendant of Donald Herrach, were also driven by the same storm to Jura. These two men collected a large amount of cattle belonging to the Macleans who lived near to the place that Donald Gorm Mor had landed, and carried them off in their galleys. Their objective was to get Donald Gorm Mor into trouble. They knew that the Macleans would believe that the theft was committed by Donald Gorm Mor and hoped that the Macleans would attack him and put him to death. The men whose cattle had been stolen went straight to Lachlan Mor Maclean to make their complaint. Lachlan Mor Maclean sailed to Jura with a number of men and made a sudden attack on Donald Gorm Mor, who had no idea what had taken place. In the battle he killed sixty of the MacDonalds, but the rest of them, including Donald Gorm Mor, made their escape. The punishment that Lachlan Mor Maclean inflicted was monstrous.

Donald Gorm Mor then made his way to Skye, fully resolved to take vengeance on the Macleans. He dispatched messengers to the chieftains of the various branches of the Clan Donald, calling upon them to assist him in the attack. Lachlan Mor Maclean having killed a number of innocent men created feelings of indignation and vengeance among all the MacDonalds who committed acts of depredation on his lands in various quarters and threatened to invade the Isle of Mull. They did find out that the cattle had actually been stolen by two MacDonalds but still felt so indignant over the slaughter of their clansmen that they were unwilling to come to terms with Lachlan Mor Maclean.

== The King's intervention ==
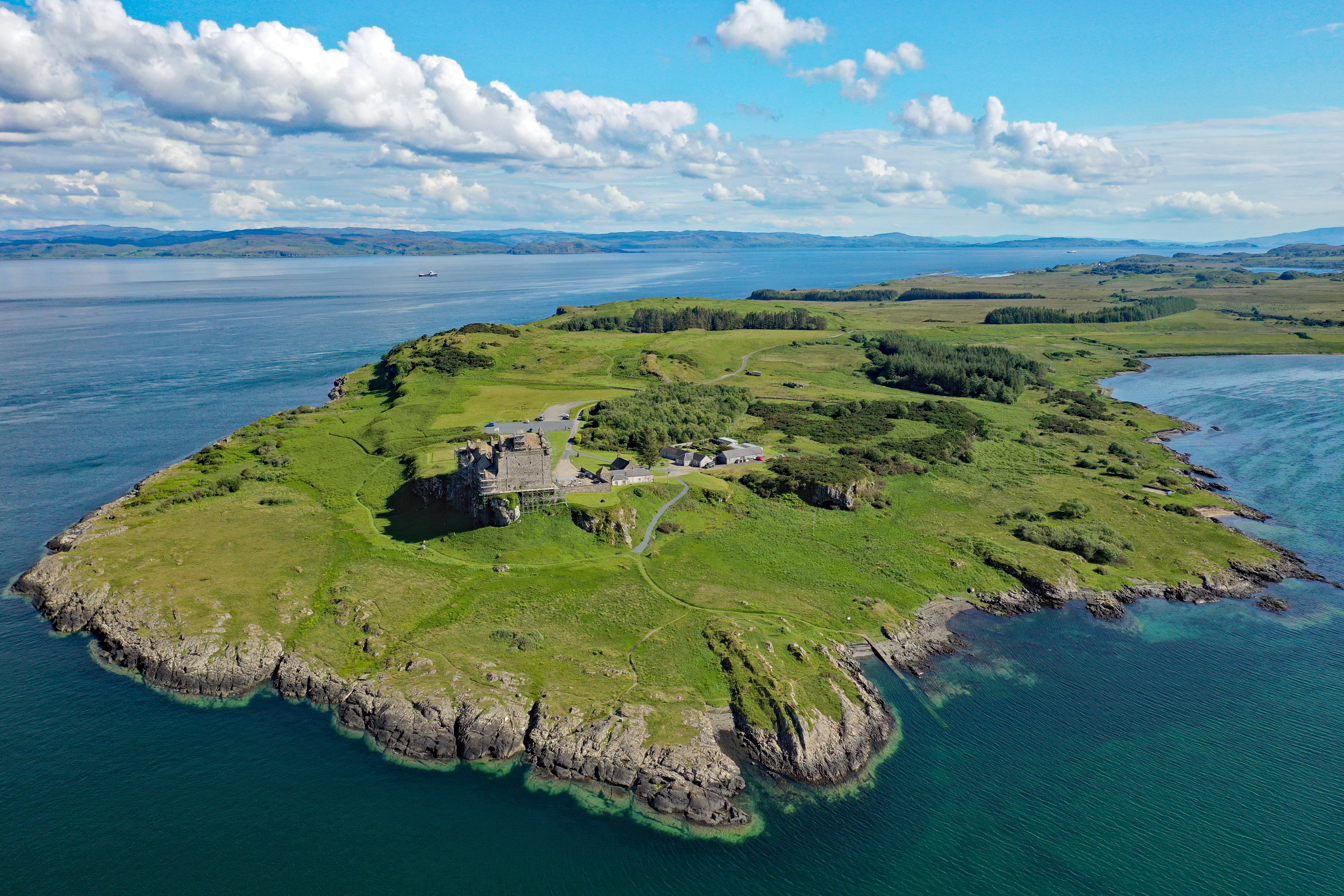
Duart Castle on the Isle of Mull, seat of the chief of the Clan Maclean since the 14th century

In September, 1585, James VI of Scotland wrote to the Chief of the Clan MacLeod, seated at Dunvegan Castle, requesting him to assist the Macleans against the MacDonalds and he also urged the MacDonalds at the same time to cease their hostilities. The MacDonalds therefore resolved to settle their disputes in a peaceful manner.

In the spring of 1586, Angus MacDonald of Islay went to Skye to consult with Donald Gorm Mor about a settlement with Lachlan Mor Maclean. On his return he called at Duart Castle to try to come to an amicable settlement with Lachlan Mor Maclean. The following day, Maclean seized both Angus and his attendants and threw them into prison until Angus agreed to renounce his claim to the Rinns of Islay. Angus also had to give his son James, and his brother, Ranald, as hostages to Lachlan until he received the lands as promised. The harsh treatment that Angus received from Maclean meant that he went back to Islay as a bitter enemy.

== The conflict on Islay, Mull, Tiree and Kintyre ==
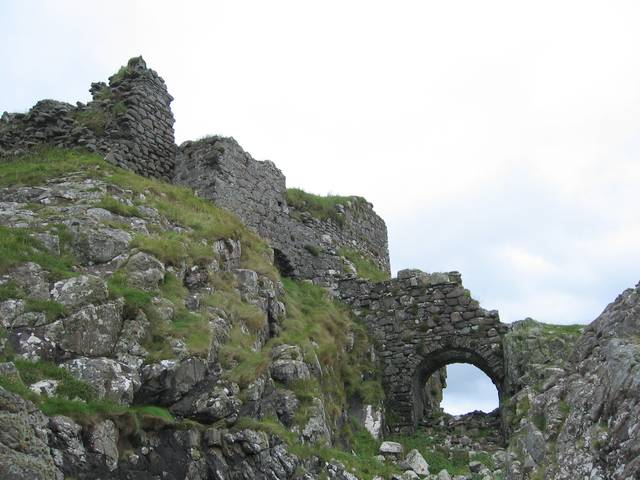
The ruins of Dunscaith Castle, historic seat of the chief of the Clan MacDonald of Sleat, in the parish of Sleat, Isle of Skye

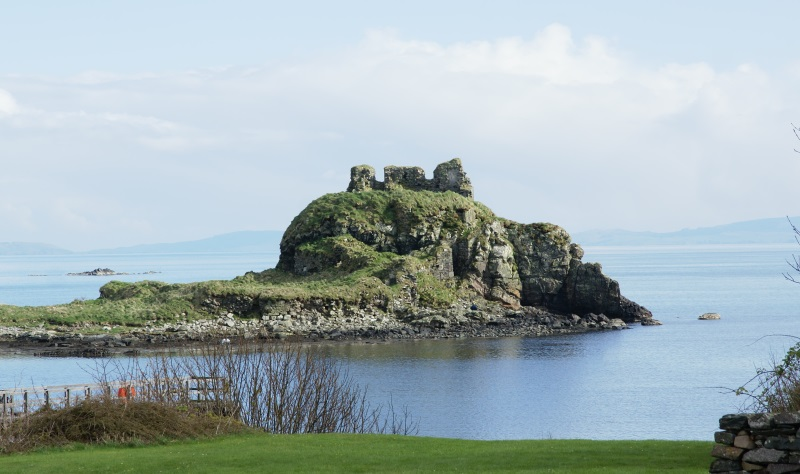
The ruins of Dunyvaig Castle, historic seat of the chief of the Clan MacDonald of Dunnyveg, located on Islay

In July, 1586, Lachlan Mor Maclean went to Islay to receive possession of the Rinns and took up his quarters at the fort of Lochgorm. He remained there for three days and received repeated invitations from Angus of Islay to visit him at Mullintrea. Maclean yielded and went to spend a night with him. He was accompanied by seventy followers, or according to another account eighty-six. Maclean was received in a friendly manner and was entertained in grand style. However, he refused to stay the night with Angus and instead went to sleep in one of the buildings which his followers were lodged in, and took with him, James, the son of Angus who was still a hostage. At midnight, Angus of Islay, with 400 armed followers went to the door of the building where Lachlan Mor Maclean was sleeping and asked him to get up and have a drink with him. Maclean went to the door with the hostage James in one hand and a sword in the other, but saw that it was impossible for him to escape. Angus saw that if a fight took place then his son would certainly be killed. Angus solemnly promised that if they gave up his son and surrendered as prisoners that their lives would be spared. Maclean accepted and so did all but two of his men. These two were John Dubh of Morvern and MacDonald Herrach who was one of the men who had caused the slaughter of the MacDoanlds for having stolen Maclean's cattle. These two men refused to leave the building and so the MacDonalds set fire to it and they perished in the flames. The prisoners were all put to death with the exception of Lachlan Mor Maclean himself.

In the history of these events published by Alexander Maclean Sinclair in 1899, he disputes the account given in the book Conflicts of the Clans which was published by the Foulis press in 1764 and which says that Angus executed all of the prisoners in one day. Sinclair states that this happened over a number of days and quotes the Ardgour MS (manuscript) as his source.

These atrocities came to the attention of the King who employed the chiefs of the Clan Campbell who governed Argyll during the minority of Archibald Campbell, 7th Earl of Argyll, to mediate between the contending clans. Angus MacDonald agreed on the condition that he would be pardoned for his crimes as well as for eight hostages to be placed in his hands by Maclean who in turn was forced to subscribe. After this MacDonald went over to Ireland but while he was away, Maclean, disregarding the hostages, invaded Islay with his clan and laid waste with fire and sword. When MacDonald returned he did not punish the hostages but collected a large force and invaded the isles of Mull and Tiree, putting to death all the inhabitants that came into their hands. Meanwhile, Maclean ravaged and plundered Kintyre.

== Aftermath ==
The Government felt it necessary to take immediate action to suppress these alarming disorders. The King and the Privy Council of Scotland issued a proclamation ordering the hostages to be given up to the young Earl of Argyll, or his guardians, and to be brought by them to the King until the final settlement of the dispute between the MacDonalds and Macleans. The two tribes and their supporters were charged to remain quiet and abstain from gathering in arms, and from attacking each other. The King also wrote to the Earl of Huntly asking him to prevent the northern islanders from gathering in arms or committing acts of hostility against each other and that it was his Majesty's intention to take "some special paines" in the affairs of the Isles as he had recently done in the Borders. An act of Parliament was also passed for maintaining good order in both the Borders and Highlands and Isles in which all clan chiefs would have to provide large sureties in accordance with their wealth for the peaceable and orderly behavior of themselves and their vassals. According to the book Conflicts of the Clans, both Angus MacDonald and Lachlan Mor Maclean were committed within the walls of Edinburgh Castle where they remained for only a short time after which they were freed for a small fine and both given a remission, but their eldest sons had to remain as a pledge of their obedience.
