= John Campbell of Cawdor (nobleman) =

Scottish nobleman (c. 1490-1546)

Sir John Campbell (c. 1490 - 1 May 1546) was a Scottish nobleman and the eponymous ancestor of the Campbells of Cawdor.

John was the third son of the Archibald Campbell, 2nd Earl of Argyll and Elizabeth, a daughter of John Stewart, 1st Earl of Lennox. He married the daughter and heiress of Sir John Calder of Calder, in 1510, whom his father had kidnapped.

Campbell made several "bonds of manrent" which formalised and cemented alliances between families. He made bands with Archbibald Campbell of Kilmichael (1516), Gilchrist Macarthur (1517), John McKerris (1517), Lachlan Mclean of Doward, Donald Ewynson, Alexander McAllan (1520), John Macallan in Lochaber (1519), the Clan Macindean (1519), the Clan MacDoulane (1518), and others.

He died on 1 May 1546, his wife Muriel surviving him dying in 1575.

== Family ==
By his wife, Muriel, daughter of John Calder of Calder and Isabella Rose, their children were:

- Archibald Campbell, died in December 1551.
- Katherine Campbell, Countess of Crawford, died on 1 October 1578.
- John Campbell, Bishop of the Isles, died in 1585.
- Janet Campbell (d. 1592), m. Alexander Fraser (1527-1557), 4th Lord Lovat
- Donald Campbell
- Margaret Campbell, m. Sir James MacDonald, 9th of Dunnyveg
- Duncan Campbell, died in 1572
- William Campbell
- Isabell Campbell
- Alexander Campbell
- Ann Campbell
