= John Dubh Maclean, 4th Chief =

John Dubh Maclean, 4th Clan Chief

4th Chief of Clan MacLean
- In office c. 1320–1365 (45 yrs)
- Preceded by: Maolcaluim mac Giliosa Maclean, father
- Succeeded by: Lachlan Lubanach Maclean of Duart, son

Personal details
- Spouse: Daughter of Cumming, Lord of the Braes of Lochaber
- Children: Lachlan Lubanach Maclean of Duart; Eachann Reaganach Maclean
- Parent: Maolcaluim mac Giliosa Maclean

John Dubh Maclean, or Iain Dubh mac Gilliemore in Scottish Gaelic, or John Maclean the Black was the 4th Chief of Clan MacLean.

== Biography ==
John succeeded his father as chief of the clan. He was known as Iain Dubh Maclean, or Black John Maclean. He married a daughter of Cumming, Lord of the Braes of Lochaber. He undoubtedly had large possessions, particularly the lands of Duard and Lochbuy, of which the Lord of the Isles was his feudal superior.

He had three sons:

- Hector Reaganach Maclean, 1st Laird of Lochbuie, or Hector the Stern, was the progenitor of the Lochbuie Macleans.
- Lachlan Lubanach Maclean of Duart, or Lachlan the Wily
- John Maclean, an illegitimate son and is considered the progenitor of the mainland Macleans of Lorn, Ardgour and Morvern

It would appear that John designed the lands of Duard for Lachlan, and those of Lochbuy for Hector. Such, at least, was the way in which they were disposed of. These two brothers made a considerable figure during the reigns of Robert II of Scotland and Robert III of Scotland. The prominence of their father, as well as their own affable behavior and pleasing manners, gained for them the friendship of John, First Lord of the Isles, in so much so, that it excited the jealousy of the courtiers, among whom the chief of MacKinnon, the master of the household, became a most inveterate enemy. In order to accomplish his revenge, or satiate his jealousy, he determined to cut the brothers off by taking their lives, while they were hunting with Lord John. Having been warned of MacKinnon's designs, the brothers easily thwarted his plans. Shortly afterward MacDonald (Lord of the Isles) started on some expedition from his castle at Arc's in Mull to the mainland, intending to remain for a season at his castle of Ardtornish in Morvern. MacKinnon, having been unavoidably detained, was to follow after, but, meeting the two brothers, he renewed the quarrel between them. Both parties were well armed, and had their retainers. In the affray which took place MacKinnon was killed while in the act of mounting into his galley, and his followers dispersed. Skene calls this "one of the most daring actions which has ever been recorded of any Highland chief." His version, however, is somewhat different from the above. Not knowing how the Lord of the Isles would take the death of the master of his household, they resolved to apply heroic measures, and keep by force that friendship which they thought might now be forfeited. They now proceeded to follow up their act by one still more daring. Immediately they manned MacKinnon's galley with their own men, and started in pursuit of John, whom they overtook a short distance from Ardtornish, captured his vessel, and carried him prisoner to one of the Garvelloch islands. Here he was detained until he solemnly promised them to remain their true friend.

== Death ==
He died during the reign of Robert II of Scotland.

== Ancestors ==
Iain Dubh mac Gilliemore's ancestors in three generations
Iain Dubh mac Gilliemore	Father: Maolcaluim mac Giliosa	Paternal Grandfather: Malise mac Gilleain	Paternal Great-Grandfather: Gilleain na Tuaighe
Iain Dubh mac Gilliemore	Father: Maolcaluim mac Giliosa	Paternal Grandfather: Malise mac Gilleain	Paternal Great-grandmother:
Iain Dubh mac Gilliemore	Father: Maolcaluim mac Giliosa	Paternal Grandmother:	Paternal Great-Grandfather:
Iain Dubh mac Gilliemore	Father: Maolcaluim mac Giliosa	Paternal Grandmother:	Paternal Great-Grandmother:
Iain Dubh mac Gilliemore	Mother: Rioghnach of Carrick	Maternal Grandfather: Gamail, Lord of Carrick	Maternal Great-Grandfather:
Iain Dubh mac Gilliemore	Mother: Rioghnach of Carrick	Maternal Grandfather: Gamail, Lord of Carrick	Maternal Great-Grandmother:
Iain Dubh mac Gilliemore	Mother: Rioghnach of Carrick	Maternal Grandmother:	Maternal Great-grandfather:
Iain Dubh mac Gilliemore	Mother: Rioghnach of Carrick	Maternal Grandmother:	Maternal Great-Grandmother:
