= Red Hector of the Battles Maclean =

Hector Roy Maclean

6th Chief of Clan Maclean 2nd Laird of Duart
- In office 1405-1411 (6 years)
- Preceded by: Lachlan Lubanach Maclean, 5th Chief, father
- Succeeded by: Lachlan Bronneach Maclean, 7th Chief, son

Personal details
- Died: 1411
- Parent: Lachlan Lubanach Maclean
- Nickname(s): Red Hector of the Battles (English); Hector Rufus Bellicosus (Latin); Eachann Ruadh nan Cath (Scottish Gaelic); Hector Roy Maclean

Red Hector of the Battles Maclean (?-1411), or Eachann Ruadh nan Cath in Scottish Gaelic, was the 6th Chief of Clan Maclean.

== Biography ==
He was the son of Lachlan Lubanach Maclean, and he early distinguished himself by daring exploits, and was noted as being one of the best swordsmen of his time. He became so celebrated as a swordsman, that many knights who had gained for themselves renown came from distant parts to measure weapons with him. One of these was a renowned knight of Norway, who challenged Hector Roy to mortal combat. The challenge was accepted. They met at Salen, in Mull, where they fought, and where the Norwegian fell. A green mound and cairn on the sea-shore mark the spot where Hector had his antagonist buried.

There was an old Gaelic poem, which affirmed that Hector commanded a great fleet to the coast of Ireland, and there defeated some of the ships of the King of England. He landed his troops; placed the city of Dublin under contribution; carried fire and sword into the country; destroyed many of his enemies, and burnt their houses. This must be the expedition hinted at in Raphael Holinshed's Chronicle of Ireland where it is recorded that "in the year 1400 at Whitesuntide, the first year of King Henry IV, the constable of Dublin, and divers others at Stanford in Ulster, fought by sea with the Scots, where many Englishmen were slain and drowned."

== Marriage and children ==
Hector Roy's marriage to a daughter of the Earl of Douglas (either Archibald the Third or Fourth Earl of Douglas) greatly enlarged his influence. That nobleman made many overtures to induce Hector to withdraw himself from his dangerous connection with his uncle Domhnall of Islay, Lord of the Isles and Earl of Ross, now on the brink of open war with Robert, Duke of Albany and regent of the kingdom. Hector firmly withstood the blandishments of his father-in-law, for his duty as hereditary Lieutenant-General of the Isles was to his uncle Donald, and the approaching contest afforded a new field for the display of his valor.

== Death ==
While serving as a lieutenant-general under his uncle Donald of Islay, Lord of the Isles at the Battle of Harlaw in 1411, Hector was killed by Sir Alexander Irvine, 3rd Chief of Clan Irvine and Laird of Drum Castle, in hand-to-hand combat, which was described as "a noble and notable single combat" where both men died of their injuries.

== Legacy ==
The 19th-century poet Iain mac Ailein, a major figure in both Scottish Gaelic literature and in that of Canadian Gaelic, was a descendant of Red Hector of the Battles.

== Ancestors ==
Eachuinn Ruadh nan cath Maclean's ancestors in three generations
Eachuinn Ruadh nan cath Maclean	Father: Lachlan Lubanach Maclean of Duart	Paternal grandfather: Iain Dubh mac Gilliemore Maclean	Paternal great-grandfather: Maolcaluim mac Giliosa Maclean
Eachuinn Ruadh nan cath Maclean	Father: Lachlan Lubanach Maclean of Duart	Paternal grandfather: Iain Dubh mac Gilliemore Maclean	Paternal great-grandmother: Rioghnach of Carrick
Eachuinn Ruadh nan cath Maclean	Father: Lachlan Lubanach Maclean of Duart	Paternal grandmother: Daughter of Cumming, Lord of the Braes of Lochaber	Paternal great-grandfather: Cumming, Lord of the Braes of Lochaber
Eachuinn Ruadh nan cath Maclean	Father: Lachlan Lubanach Maclean of Duart	Paternal grandmother: Daughter of Cumming, Lord of the Braes of Lochaber	Paternal great-grandmother:
Eachuinn Ruadh nan cath Maclean	Mother: Mary Macdonald	Maternal grandfather: John of Islay, Lord of the Isles	Maternal great-grandfather: Aonghus Óg Mac Domhnaill, Lord of Islay
Eachuinn Ruadh nan cath Maclean	Mother: Mary Macdonald	Maternal grandfather: John of Islay, Lord of the Isles	Maternal great-grandmother: Áine Ní Chatháin
Eachuinn Ruadh nan cath Maclean	Mother: Mary Macdonald	Maternal grandmother: Margaret Stewart	Maternal great-grandfather: Robert II of Scotland
Eachuinn Ruadh nan cath Maclean	Mother: Mary Macdonald	Maternal grandmother: Margaret Stewart	Maternal great-grandmother: Elizabeth Mure
