= Lachlan Maclean, 10th Chief =

10th Chief of Clan Maclean 6th Laird of Duart
- In office 1496–1513 (17 years)
- Preceded by: Hector Odhar Maclean, 9th Chief, father
- Succeeded by: Lachlan Cattanach Maclean, 11th Chief, son
- Nickname(s): Hector the Swarthy (English); Eachuinn ni num-bristion (Scottish Gaelic); Eachann Odhar Maclean (Scottish Gaelic)

Lachlan Maclean or Lauchlane Makgilleon of Doward (c. 1470 – 1513) was the tenth Clan Chief of Clan MacLean. He became the 10th Chief at the death of his father in 1496.

== Biography ==
He was born around 1470 to Hector Odhar Maclean, 9th Chief. He became the 10th Chief at the death of his father in 1496. He was killed in the Battle of Flodden on 9 September 1513.

== Documents ==
The following documents concern Lachlan Maclean:

- There was an illegitimate son who had the property entailed to him. In Registrum Secrcti Sigilli, Volume I., folio 29, may be found the " legitimation to Lauchlane McGilleon son natural to Hector McGilleon of Doward. October 1496." In the same records, same volume and folio, may be found a " Precept for charter of resignation to the said Lauchlan, of lands of Torresay, Castle of Doward, lands of 'Browhes, & Merkland in Ardmanach etc. in free barony to him and his heirs male; whom failing, to the said Hector Makgil- lane, and his heirs male; whom failing, to Donald McGillan brother of the said Hector, and his heirs male; whom failing, to the heirs male whatsoever of the said Hector bearing the arms and surname of McGillan. To hold in ward, relief and marriage. 8 October 1496."
- In the next place, I purpose to show that the said Lachlan was recognized as Lord of Duard, on and after the year 1499. In the same records, same volume, folio 115, may be found a "respite to Lachlan McClcan of Doward, John McClean of Coil, Donald McClean ' Eym' to the said Lachlan. 27 February 1499."
- In the same records, Volume III., folio 1, is a "remission to Lachlan Maklane of Dovarde and his complices, for various faults. 31 May 1505."
- In the same records, same volume, folio 36, is a " letter to Lauchlane Makgilleon of Doward and 9 other landit men in the Isles, charging them not to intromit with the Kirk rents pertaining to the Bishop of the Isles, and so help -him to gather them in. 23 January 1506."
- In "the same records, same volume, folio 208, is a "letter of Licence to Lacklane Makgillane of Dowart to sell his lands of Carrequhoull, Auchna-dalyn, etc. in the Lordship of Badenoch, to Alexander Gordon, 3rd Earl of Huntly. 2 January 1508."
- Same date, records, and volume, folio 209, is a letter of regress to the said Lachlan to the same lands of reversion.
- In the same records, volume, and folio, date of January, 1508, is a protection to "Lady Agnes daughter of Donald Makgillane, Prioress of the nuns" in lona, charging "Lauchlan McGillane of Dowart," and others.
- In the same records, Volume IV., folio 58, is a " letter of safe conduct to Lauchlan McGillane, his kinsmen and servants to come to the king's presence at Stirling, to be of force for 40 days. 12 April 1510."
- Same records and volume, folio 72, may be found a " precept for charter of apprising to Duncan Stewart of Appin, over the lands and castle of Dowart, apprised from Lachlan McGilleon of Dowart for 4500 merks due to the said Duncan: reserving to the said Lachlan power to redeem within 7 years. 8 April 1510."

== Ancestors ==
Lachlan Maclean, 10th Chief's ancestors in three generations
Lachlan Maclean, 10th Chief	Father: Hector Odhar Maclean, 9th Chief	Paternal Grandfather: Lachlan Og Maclean, 8th Chief	Paternal Great-Grandfather: Lachlan Bronneach Maclean, 7th Chief
Lachlan Maclean, 10th Chief	Father: Hector Odhar Maclean, 9th Chief	Paternal Grandfather: Lachlan Og Maclean, 8th Chief	Paternal Great-grandmother:
Lachlan Maclean, 10th Chief	Father: Hector Odhar Maclean, 9th Chief	Paternal Grandmother: Catherine Campbell	Paternal Great-Grandfather:
Lachlan Maclean, 10th Chief	Father: Hector Odhar Maclean, 9th Chief	Paternal Grandmother: Catherine Campbell	Paternal Great-Grandmother:
Lachlan Maclean, 10th Chief	Mother: Mackintosh	Maternal Grandfather:	Maternal Great-Grandfather:
Lachlan Maclean, 10th Chief	Mother: Mackintosh	Maternal Grandfather:	Maternal Great-Grandmother:
Lachlan Maclean, 10th Chief	Mother: Mackintosh	Maternal Grandmother:	Maternal Great-grandfather:
Lachlan Maclean, 10th Chief	Mother: Mackintosh	Maternal Grandmother:	Maternal Great-Grandmother:
