= Wreck Detectives =

British television documentary series

Wreck Detectives is the title of two TV documentary series from UK Channel 4 aired in 2003 and 2004 presented by Jeremy Seal, Miranda Krestovnikoff and David Manley.

== Series 1 – 2003 ==
1. Alum Bay wreck, Alum Bay
2. Earl of Abergavenny, Weymouth Bay
3. Mingary Castle wreck, Sound of Mull
4. HMS Lawford, Normandy
5. HMS Stirling Castle, Kent
6. St Peter Port wrecks, Guernsey
7. Swan, Sound of Mull
8. HMS Hazardous, The Solent

== Series 2 – 2004 ==
1. Resurgam, Colwyn Bay
2. Bronze Bell, Cardigan Bay
3. Sunderland flying boat, Milford Haven
4. Hope, Chesil Beach, Dorset
5. U-boat B-65, Padstow
6. Lelia, Liverpool
7. Great Lewis, Waterford
8. HMS Pylades, Normandy

== DVD release ==
Wreck Detectives Series 1 was released on DVD in 2005 containing all 8 episodes
