= English ship Swan (1641) =

History

England
- Name: Swan
- Launched: 1641 as HMS Swann
- Commissioned: 1646 as Swan
- Captured: 1645
- Fate: Sunk, 13 September 1653

General characteristics
- Tons burthen: 200 (bm)
- Sail plan: Full-rigged ship

Swan was a 200-ton warship of the English navy, launched as a Royalist vessel in 1641 but captured by the Commonwealth of England when her crew revolted in 1645. She carried twelve cannons, which were cast by John Browne.

The warship was a part of Oliver Cromwell's fleet of six vessels which attacked a Royalist stronghold at Duart Castle in Mull, UK, during the English Civil War. She sank in storm on 13 September 1653 off the west coast of Scotland.

A naval diver found the remnants of the Swan in 1979 and important items from the wreck were recovered during the 1990s in an excavation led by maritime archaeologist Colin Martin from the University of St Andrews in Fife, Scotland. Items recovered at that time included a corroded pocket watch which appeared to look like "...little more than a lump of rock from the outside", many silver coins, iron guns and other military artifacts. The items were deposited with the National Museum of Scotland.

== History ==
=== Capture ===
In 1645, whilst anchored at Dublin, and with Swan's captain absent from the ship, the disgruntled crew were persuaded by the captain of a Parliamentary frigate to change sides upon promise of payment of wages regularly. Thus the ship became part of the Cromwellian fleet.

=== Sinking ===
In September 1653, a Cromwellian task force anchored off Duart Castle, a staunch Royalist stronghold of the Macleans, who had already fled to Tiree. On 13 September 1653, a violent storm blew up from the north west, which resulted in two commandeered merchantmen, Martha and Margaret of Ipswich and Speedwell of King's Lynn being sunk, along with Swan. The wreck of Swan was discovered in 1979.

=== Protection of the wreck ===
The Duart Point historic marine protected area, which covers the probable wreck site, was designated on 1 November 2013.

== Recovered artifacts ==
=== Cannon ===
In 2003, one of the cannons from the ship was recovered. It turned out to be an iron 'Drake' cast by John Browne, and is believed to be the only survivor of this type of cannon. It has a mass of 3 cwt 2 qtrs 23 lb, or 415 lb (188.2 kg), and had a 3½" (89mm) muzzle and fired shot weighing 4 pounds (1.81 kg). Another ship of the era, Sovereign of the Seas, had bronze cannons that were also cast by Browne.

=== Watch ===
A barely recognizable, severely corroded and barnacle-covered pocket watch was recovered from the wreck in 1979. It was transferred to the National Museum of Scotland, where researchers Lore Troalen, Darren Cox and Theo Skinner decided to try to analyze the watch's interior components by utilizing a state-of-the-art computed tomography (CT) X-ray scanner, originally developed by X-Tek Systems of Tring, Hertfordshire, U.K. The same type of CT scanner had been previously used to create a finely detailed 3D virtual reconstruction of the Greek Antikythera Mechanism recovered from the 2,200-year-old sunken Antikythera wreck in the Aegean Sea.

Imaging from the CT scans of the watch was used to produce equally fine-detailed three-dimensional views of its interior, depicting beautifully preserved delicate brass components which included cogwheels, studs, pins, Egyptian-style pillars supporting the watch's top and bottom plates, as well as the watchmaker's personal identification (Niccholas Higginson of Chancery Lane in Westminster, London). Among the decorative markings discerned were floral designs engraved on some of its parts, plus Roman numerals and fleur-de-lis on its watchface, with an English rose at its centre.

== Television programme ==
The story of the ship was featured in Channel 4's programme Wreck Detectives.

== Bibliography ==
- Martin, Colin. Resurrecting the Swan: Archaeology of a Cromwellian Shipwreck, 1653, History Scotland Magazine. Retrieved 31 December 2007.
- BBC History. Wreck Detectives: Cromwell's Ship, BBC History. Retrieved 31 December 2007.
- Monroe, Luther. Archaeologists recover rare cannon from 'Swan' wreck, Cyber Diver News Network. Retrieved 31 December 2007.
- Wreck Detectives - The wrecks - The Swan. Channel 4. Retrieved 31 December 2007.
- Winfield, Rif (2009). British Warships in the Age of Sail, 1603-1714. Seaforth Publishing. ISBN 9781848320406.
