= Lachlan Og Maclean =

Lachlan Óg Maclean, 8th Clan Chief

8th Chief of Maclean 4th Laird of Duart
- In office circa 1472 – circa 1478 (6 years)
- Preceded by: Lachlan Bronneach Maclean, 7th Chief
- Succeeded by: Hector Odhar Maclean, 9th Chief

Personal details
- Born: Lachlan Óg Maclean; 1432 Duart Castle
- Died: 1484 (aged 51–52)
- Spouse(s): Catherine, daughter of Colin Campbell, 1st Earl of Argyll
- Children: Eachann Odhar Maclean
- Parent: Lachlan Bronneach Maclean

Lachlan Óg Maclean, was the 8th Chief of Maclean.

== Biography ==
He was the son of Lachlan Bronneach Maclean. Lachlan Og was called Lachlan the Younger to distinguish him from his father. He was Lord of Duart and Chief of Clan MacLean when political changes were taking place in the Western Isles. The western chiefs had thought themselves independent of the king, and were obedient only to the Lord of the Isles, who ruled in princely style. In 1448, John of Islay, Earl of Ross became one of the strongest opponents of the king's party. In 1462, he entered into a compact with the banished House of Douglas and the commissioners of England, in which it was stipulated that John, with his vassals and such auxiliaries as would be furnished by Edward IV of England, and the assistance that might be given by the Douglases, should enter upon the conquest of Scotland; that John, Donald Balloch, and John, the sons and heirs of MacDonald, upon the payment of a stipulated sum of money (John, £200 sterling annually in time of war, and one hundred marks in time of peace; to Donald Balloch, £40, and to John, his son, £20, in time of war, and in times of peace half these sums respectively), should become forever the sworn vassals of England, and assist in the wars in Ireland and elsewhere. In the event of the conquest of Scotland, then that kingdom should be equally divided between John, Donald Balloch, and the Earl of Douglas. While these negotiations were still pending, the Lord of the Isles assembled a large force, captured the castle of Inverness, and commenced to assert authority over Inverness, Nairn, Ross, and Caithness.

How this extraordinary rebellion was suppressed is uncertain. He was summoned before parliament for treason; and that on failing to appear, the process of forfeiture against him was suspended for a time, and he was allowed to retain undisturbed possession of his estates for about fifteen years. The treaty of 1462 did not come to light until 1475, when the Scottish government determined to proceed against John as an avowed traitor and rebel. Commission was given to Colin Campbell, 1st Earl of Argyll, to prosecute a decree of forfeiture against him; and on the appointed day, failing to appear, sentence was passed upon him. So great were the preparations now made against him, that MacDonald sued for pardon, and with much humility surrendered to the king's mercy. He was pardoned and restored to his forfeited estates on 1 July 1476. Soon after, the earldom of Ross and the lands of Kintyre and Knapdale became inalienably annexed to the crown. This caused great dissatisfaction on the part of Angus, the bastard son of MacDonald, a man who was early accustomed to rebellion. The division of the lands also divided the vassals of the Lordship of the Isles, the MacLeans, MacLeods, and MacNeils adhering to John, while the various branches of the Clan MacDonald made common cause with the turbulent heir of the lordship.

== Marriage and children ==
He was married to Catherine, daughter of Colin Campbell, 1st Earl of Argyll. His father-in-law and his accomplices were successful in involving the Lord of the Isles in difficulties, and although he did not scruple to misrepresent his son-in-law and brand him as a recreant chief, yet Lachlan's judgment and skill warded off every blow Argyle attempted to inflict.

- Eachann Odhar Maclean, who succeeded him as clan chief
- Fionnaghal (Finvola) Maclean, who was married to Celestine Macdonald of Lochalsh, son of Alexander of Islay, Earl of Ross and Lord of the Isles. The marriage of Fionnaghal must have taken place in 1462, for in that year at Dingwall Castle on 2 February, John of the Isles granted to his brother "Celestine de insulis of the lands of Lochalsh, etc., to hold to the said Celestine and the heirs to be gotten between him and Finvola, daughter of Lachlan Mcilleon of Dowart."
- Anne, who was married to William Munro, 12th Baron of Foulis

== Ancestors ==
Lachlan Og Maclean's ancestors in three generations
Lachlan Og Maclean	Father: Lachlan Bronneach Maclean	Paternal Grandfather: (Hector) Eachuinn Ruadh nan cath Maclean	Paternal Great-Grandfather: Lachlan Lubanach Maclean of Duart
Lachlan Og Maclean	Father: Lachlan Bronneach Maclean	Paternal Grandfather: (Hector) Eachuinn Ruadh nan cath Maclean	Paternal Great-grandmother: Mary Mcdonald, the daughter of John of Islay, Lord of the Isles
Lachlan Og Maclean	Father: Lachlan Bronneach Maclean	Paternal Grandmother: Marion Mor Campbell	Paternal Great-Grandfather: Sir Colin Longantach "Extraordinary Lord" Campbell
Lachlan Og Maclean	Father: Lachlan Bronneach Maclean	Paternal Grandmother: Marion Mor Campbell	Paternal Great-Grandmother: Countess Mariota Margaret West Campbell
Lachlan Og Maclean	Mother: Lady Margaret Janet Stewart	Maternal Grandfather:Alexander Stewart, Earl of Mar	Maternal Great-Grandfather: Alexander Stewart, Earl of Buchan
Lachlan Og Maclean	Mother: Lady Margaret Janet Stewart	Maternal Grandfather:Alexander Stewart, Earl of Mar	Maternal Great-Grandmother: Mairead inghean Eachainn
Lachlan Og Maclean	Mother: Lady Margaret Janet Stewart	Maternal Grandmother: possibly Isabel Douglas, Countess of Mar	Maternal Great-grandfather: William Douglas, Earl of Douglas
Lachlan Og Maclean	Mother: Lady Margaret Janet Stewart	Maternal Grandmother: possibly Isabel Douglas, Countess of Mar	Maternal Great-Grandmother: Margaret Mar Douglas
