= HMS Pylades (J401) =

Minesweeper of the Royal Navy

Coordinates: 49°25′36″N 00°15′04″W

History

United Kingdom
- Name: HMS Pylades
- Namesake: Pylades
- Builder: Savannah Machinery and Foundry Co.
- Laid down: 30 January 1943
- Launched: 27 June 1943
- Commissioned: 24 November 1943
- Fate: Sunk 8 July 1944 during Normandy Landings

General characteristics
- Class & type: Catherine-class minesweeper

HMS Pylades was a Catherine-class minesweeper of the Royal Navy.

The Catherine class was the British designation for the United States Navy's Auk class minesweeper.

She was sunk on 8 July 1944 off Juno Beach during the Normandy landings. The crew reported two explosions astern, following which the ship sank. The captain's report stated that the damage was most likely caused by two mines.

A survey of the wreck as part of Channel 4's Wreck Detectives underwater archaeological TV series indicated that the damage was actually caused by torpedo attack. Given the date of the sinking, these must have been launched from German Marder or Neger mini submarines, which were the only German torpedo-capable units at sea at the time of the attack.
