= Mingary Castle =

Castle in Lochaber, Scotland

Coordinates: 56°41′37″N 6°04′51″W

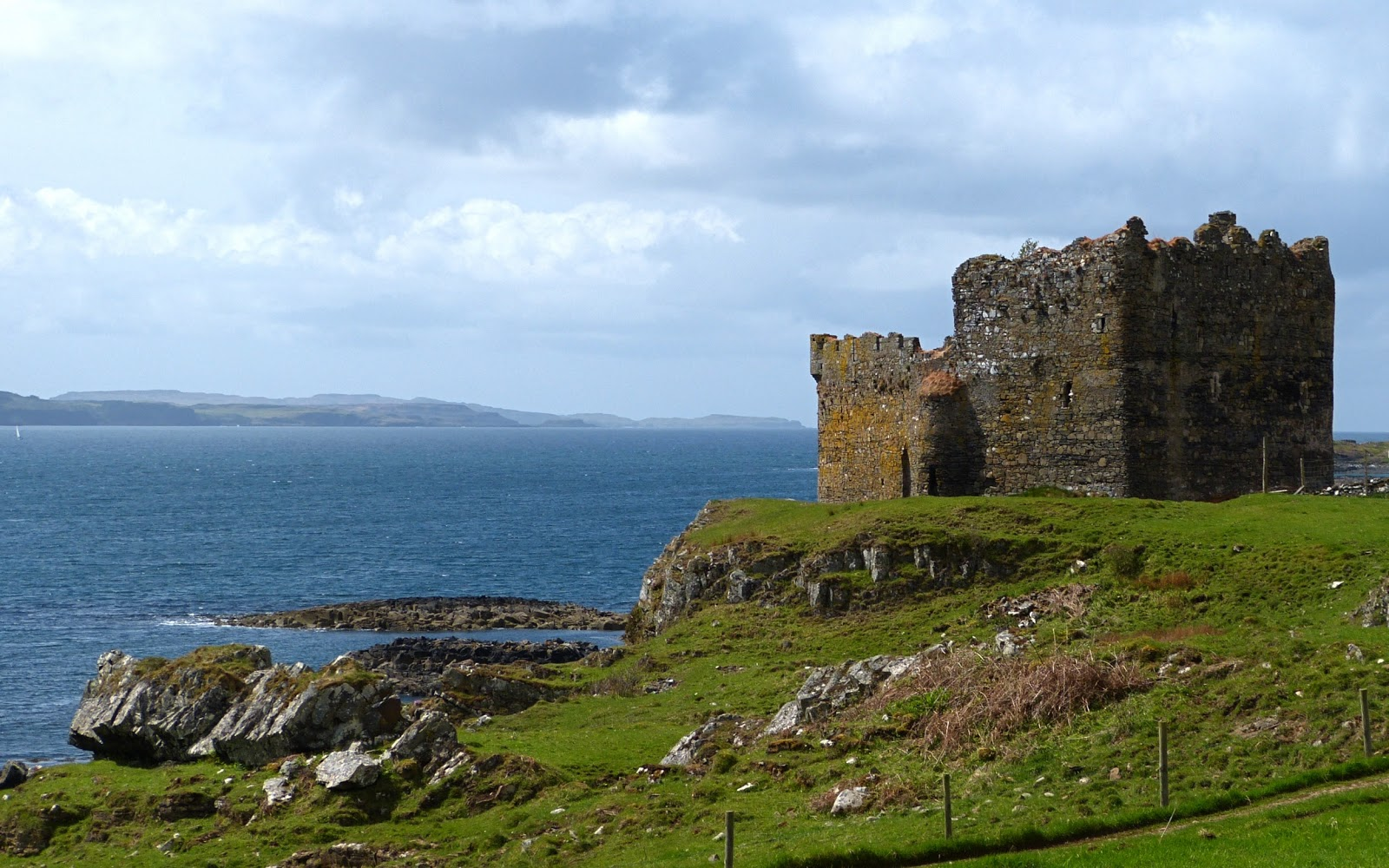
Mingary Castle

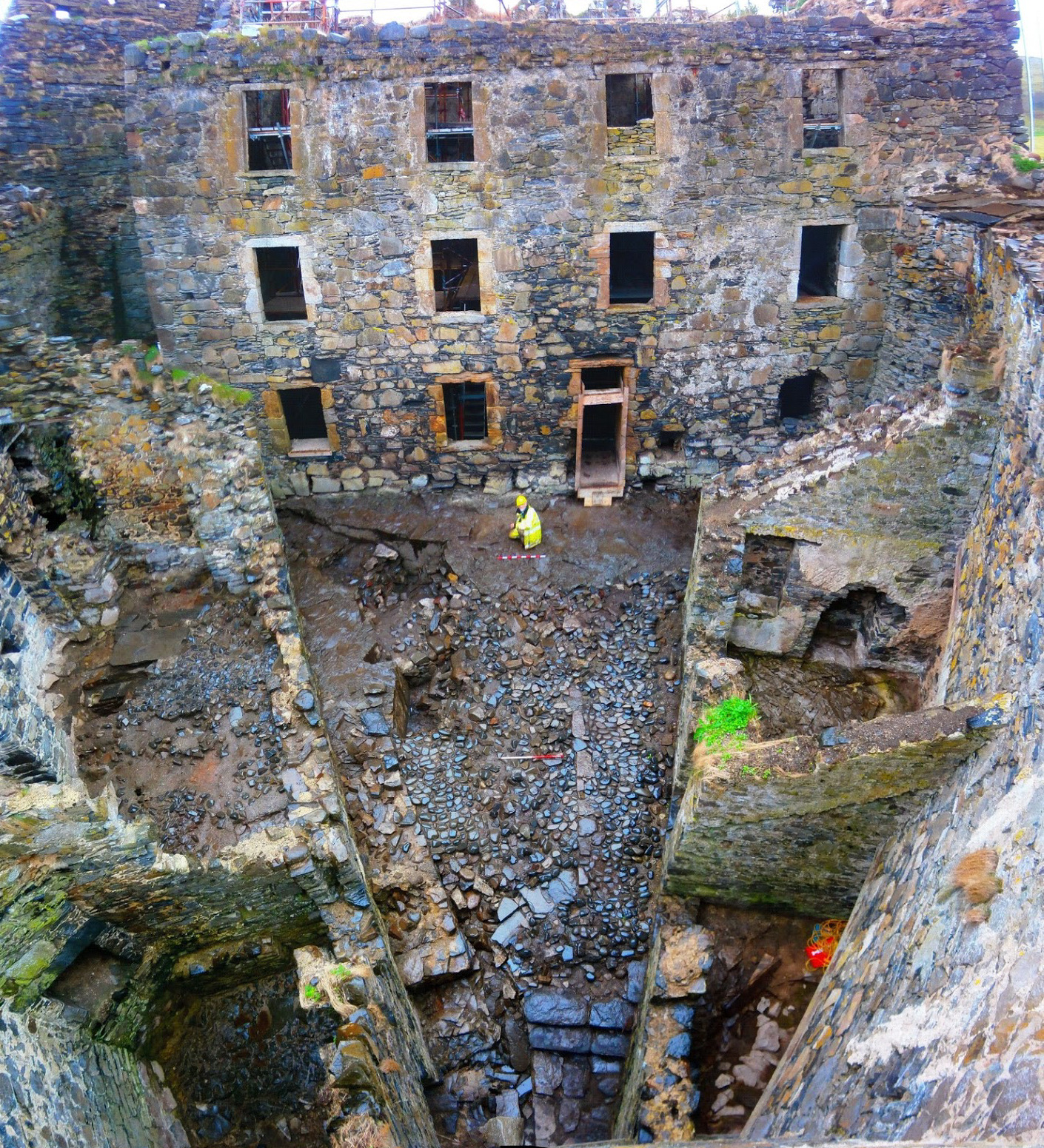
Inner courtyard of Mingary Castle

Mingary Castle (Scottish Gaelic: Caisteal Mhìogharraidh), also known as Mingarry Castle, is a castle situated one mile (1.5 kilometres) southeast of the small village of Kilchoan in Lochaber, Scotland. Nestled on ridge of rock overlooking the sea, it was considered a strategically important site in terms of communication with overseas areas and as an entranceway to the Sound of Mull. Mingary is roughly hexagonal in shape with nine-foot-thick walls, thicker on the seaward side. The remains of the castle are protected as a category A listed building.

== History ==
Mingary Castle dates to either the thirteenth- or fourteenth century. It could have been originally constructed by either the MacDougalls or the MacDonalds of Ardnamurchan (also known as the MacIains of Ardnamurchan).

King James IV of Scotland used it as a stronghold for fighting off Clan Donald in the late 15th century. In March 1499 he gave John McEan or McIain the lands of Ardnamurchan and "Castle Mengarie" after he had captured John of Islay, Lord of the Isles.

In 1515 the castle was besieged by the Clan MacDonald of Lochalsh and again two years later when they finally took the castle. In 1588 the chief of the MacLeans of Duart resided there after capturing the chief of the MacDonalds of Ardnamurchan. In 1588, one of the ships of the Spanish Armada, named the San Juan de Sicilia, landed on Mull and MacLean of Duart used troops from the ship to aid him in his warring against the MacDonalds of Clanranald and the MacIans of Ardnamurchan. On one occasion, a force from the ship besieged to the castle for three days before withdrawing.

Other occupants over the years included the Clan Campbell, the Earls of Argyll (in 1612), and Alasdair mac Colla who took the castle from its Covenanter garrison in 1644.

In 2006 a Channel 4 television programme Wreck Detectives set out to uncover a shipwreck in the Sound of Mull, directly below the castle. The wreck was finally dated to 1644. In 2013 the site was designated as a Historic Marine Protected Area.

== Renovation and Restoration ==
A recent survey showed that the main curtain wall on the sea side is in imminent danger of collapse. Work will shortly commence to stabilise the wall by underpinning it before proceeding to preserve and restore the castle, after important preliminary archaeological work has been completed. All work is being undertaken by the Mingary Castle Preservation and Restoration Trust, a registered charity in Scotland. Detailed commentary on progress and emerging insights from the largely untouched archeology will be provided. The draw bridge was put back in place, fitted by thistle marine and Don electrical services from Aberdeenshire Scotland.

== See also ==
- Castles in Scotland
