= Margaret Naylor =

British woman who became first female deep-sea diver

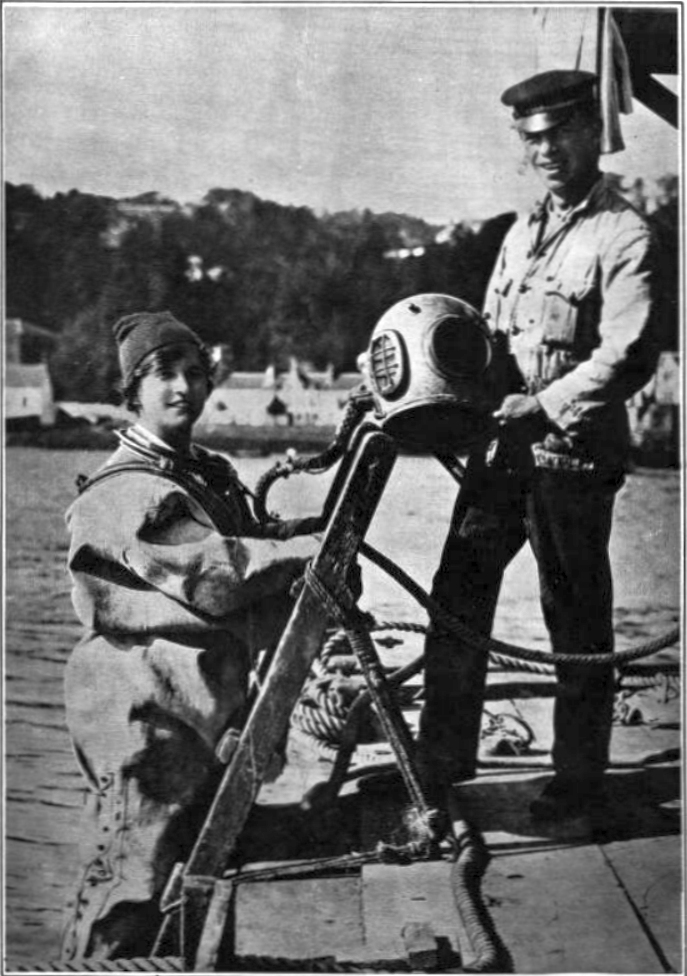
Naylor preparing for a dive in 1920

Anne Margaret Mary Therese Naylor (10 July 1893 – 16 August 1967) more commonly known as Margaret Naylor was the first woman deep-sea diver.

Naylor was born in 1893. During the First World War Naylor worked for the British government eventually working in the Ministry of Information as part of the Office of Propaganda in Enemy Countries or the Crewe House committee.

== Diver ==
By 1919, Naylor had become the secretary to Kenneth Mackenzie Foss, a retired Indian Army colonel. Foss held a salvage licence to a sunken Spanish ship from the Armada which had gone down in Tobermory Bay in 1588. Foss believed the ship was the Florencia, one of the Spanish flagships and carrying a fortune in gold coins. (Note: The ship has never been conclusively identified but is generally believed to be the San Juan de Sicilia.)

Naylor was fascinated by the work of the divers and asked Foss for the opportunity to dive herself. Initially her proposal was rebuffed but after Naylor studied the subject and questioned the male divers, Foss relented and with no prior experience allowed Naylor to dive on the wreck, 70 feet (21.3 m) down. The first dive almost ended in disaster as Naylor's suit telephone stopped working and the surface team started to haul her up. On reaching the ladder, the surface team continued to haul but one of Naylor's boots had jammed in the ladder. This had the effect of starting to pull the helmet off. Naylor did manage to jerk the safety rope to stop the team and then managed to free her boot before continuing her ascent. Naylor was not discouraged and despite continued opposition dived more and more. Her exploits as the first woman deep-sea diver were reported in the American magazine Popular Science Monthly in August 1920. Her career became more publicly known in the United Kingdom in 1922 following an article in The Daily News which was syndicated across North America and Australia.

Two years later, in 1924, it was reported that following an injury to Foss that Naylor was in charge of renewed salvage efforts on the wreck. In June 1924, Naylor had another close shave when her helmet started to leak during a dive and she almost drowned. Naylor worked with Foss again in 1928 on another attempt to salvage the ship.

== Personal life ==
Naylor married Royal Navy Paymaster-commander McKenzie Leash in 1925. They resided in Sussex until her death in 1967.
