= Ailean Maclean =

Ailean Maclean (flourished 16th century) was the second son of Lachlan Cattanach Maclean, but better known as Ailean nan Sop, or Allan o' the Wisp, because he set fire to buildings with straw, was a very noted character. He appears in Tales of a Grandfather by Sir Walter Scott.

Many legends have been told concerning him, some of which can not be true, although they may contain a grain of truth. The best known legend is that related by Sir Walter Scott, in his Tales of a Grandfather but it is wholly wrong in several essential particulars. It is so mixed with Patrick MacLean and Sir Lachlan Mor MacLean, that it would be difficult to reconstruct it. It is, however, so well told that others have seen fit to copy it bodily, if notwithstanding Scott's assertion to the contrary, all the MacLean manuscripts are agreed that Ailean was born in wedlock, was the younger brother of Hector Mor Maclean, and second son of Lachlan Cattanach Maclean, by his wife Marian. Ailean, or Allan, first comes into notice during the time when his father resided at Cairnburg. During that time, a daughter of MacNeil of Barra, who was a young lady of great beauty, was visiting the chieftain's family, and Allan, being captivated with her, made honorable love, which met with discouragement at her hands. This marked a turning-point in his career. Allan, thus repulsed in his advances, meditated the most brutal insult to the family's guest, and taking advantage of the absence of his father and mother, who were on a brief visit to the mainland, he violently seized his intended victim. She, however, succeeded in escaping from him, and in her alarm rushed toward the brink of a precipice, as if intending to throw herself off. She was closely pursued by Allan; and the scene being in the immediate neighborhood of the guard-house, a domestic on duty there, suspecting the wrong intention, with great quickness rushed forward, and seizing hold of the lady with one hand, with the other dexterously hurled Allan headlong over the precipice. Fortunately for Allan, he was caught on a projection which at that point formed a shelf. Here he remained, and was not extricated until he begged the lady's forgiveness and vowed pardon to the intrepid domestic who had so unceremoniously hurled him into his awkward position. This is the origin of the familiar modern phrase, "putting a lover on the shelf." The spot is still called Urraigh Ailean nan Sop (Allan na Sop's Shelf).
