= Lachlan McLean =

Lachlan McLean may refer to:

- Lachlan McLean (news anchor)
- Lachlan McLean (footballer)

== See also ==
- Lachlan Maclean (disambiguation)
