= Lachlan Lubanach Maclean =

14th-century Scottish chieftain (c1350-1405)

Lachlan Lubanach Maclean of Duart, 5th Clan Chief

5th Clan Maclean Chief 1st Laird of Duart
- In office circa 1365 - 1405
- Preceded by: John Dubh Maclean, 4th Chief, father
- Succeeded by: Red Hector of the Battles Maclean, 6th Chief, son

Personal details
- Born: Lachlan Lubanach Maclean circa 1350
- Died: 1405
- Spouse: Mary Mcdonald (m. 1367)
- Children: Eachuinn Ruadh nan cath Maclean
- Parent: Iain Dubh mac Gilliemore Maclean

Lachlan Lùbanach Maclean, 5th Chief (flourished 1370s) was Chief of Clan Maclean. He was the first Maclean to occupy Castle Duart as the 1st Laird of Duart. His brother Hector Reaganach Maclean was the progenitor of the Lochbuie Macleans (usually spelled "MacLaines").

== Biography ==
It is not known when Lachlan Lùbanach became fifth chief of MacLean, succeeding his father, Iain Dubh mac Gilliemore Maclean. It was probably before 1365.

After he became chief he feuded with the MacDougalls and Camerons. John of Islay, Lord of the Isles, lived until 1386, when he was succeeded by his son Domhnall of Islay, Lord of the Isles. Under Domhnall, as the second Lord of the Isles, Lachlan took due precaution to have his lands confirmed by charter, which occurred in 1390.

He married Mary Mcdonald, the daughter of John of Islay, Lord of the Isles, possibly a daughter of John's first marriage. They had:

- Eachuinn Ruadh nan cath Maclean, also known as Red Hector, his successor at Duart.
- John Maclean
- Lachlan Maclean
- Neil Maclean
- Somerled Maclean
- Finvola Maclean who married Celestine MacDonald of Clan MacDonald of Lochalsh, natural son of Alexander MacDonald, Earl of Ross.

Lachlan Lubanach lived to a great age. The date of his death is not known, but it must have been before 1405, for on 28 January 1405 at Dundonald, Hector was a witness to a charter confirmed by the king in favour of James Kennedy.

== Legacy ==
Lachlan Lubanach is generally regarded as the first Maclean of Duart because the oldest recorded charter in existence is in his favour. But that does not imply that he was the first possessor.

A fictionalised account of Lachlan's marriage and coming in possession of Duart was given by Fitzroy Maclean in The Isles of The Sea.

== Ancestors ==
Lachlan Lubanach Maclean's ancestors in three generations
Lachlan Lubanach Maclean	Father: Iain Dubh mac Gilliemore Maclean	Paternal Grandfather: Maolcaluim mac Giliosa Maclean	Paternal Great-Grandfather: Malise mac Gilleain
Lachlan Lubanach Maclean	Father: Iain Dubh mac Gilliemore Maclean	Paternal Grandfather: Maolcaluim mac Giliosa Maclean	Paternal Great-grandmother:
Lachlan Lubanach Maclean	Father: Iain Dubh mac Gilliemore Maclean	Paternal Grandmother: Rioghnach of Carrick	Paternal Great-Grandfather: Gamail, Lord of Carrick
Lachlan Lubanach Maclean	Father: Iain Dubh mac Gilliemore Maclean	Paternal Grandmother: Rioghnach of Carrick	Paternal Great-Grandmother: Gillise Iosa MacGillean
Lachlan Lubanach Maclean	Mother: Daughter of Lord of the Braes of Lodiaber	Maternal Grandfather: Cumming, Lord of the Braes of Lodiaber	Maternal Great-Grandfather:
Lachlan Lubanach Maclean	Mother: Daughter of Lord of the Braes of Lodiaber	Maternal Grandfather: Cumming, Lord of the Braes of Lodiaber	Maternal Great-Grandmother:
Lachlan Lubanach Maclean	Mother: Daughter of Lord of the Braes of Lodiaber	Maternal Grandmother:	Maternal Great-grandfather:
Lachlan Lubanach Maclean	Mother: Daughter of Lord of the Braes of Lodiaber	Maternal Grandmother:	Maternal Great-Grandmother:
