= San Juan de Sicilia =

History
- Name: Brod Martolosi
- Out of service: seized by the viceroy of Sicily for service in the Spanish fleet, December 1586

Spain
- Name: San Juan de Sicilia
- Acquired: for the Spanish fleet, December 1586
- Fate: exploded and sank off the Isle of Mull, Scotland, 5 November 1588

General characteristics
- Class & type: Spanish galleon
- Tons burthen: 800
- Complement: 62 crewmen; 287 soldiers
- Armament: 26 guns

San Juan de Sicilia was one of the 130 ships that formed the ill-fated Spanish Armada of 1588. The ship was originally known as Brod Martolosi, before she was seized to form part of the navy. She was one of 10 ships forming the Levant squadron, one of 8 squadrons that formed the entire armada.

The ship was wrecked off the Inner Hebridean island of Mull, in Argyll, Scotland.

Over the years the true identity of the wreck was forgotten, and rumours of gold were tied to the ship. The ship was said to have been named Florida, and to have been the flagship of the fleet, and a treasure ship. She was also said to have been Florencia. It was not until the turn of the 20th century that the true identity of the ship was determined.

The remains of San Juan de Sicilia have been destroyed by countless searches for gold.

== Spanish Armada ==
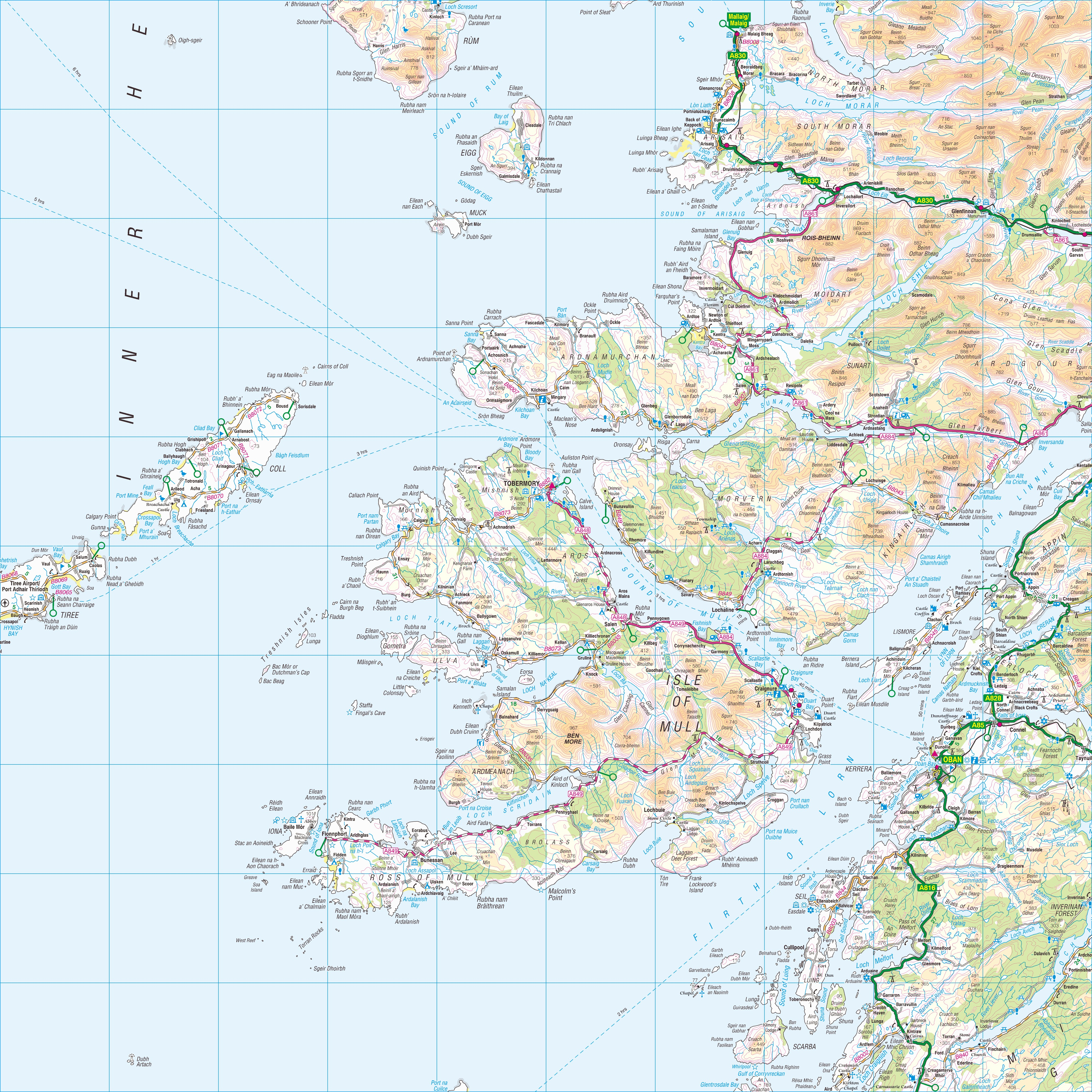
Ordnance Survey map of the Isle of Mull

San Juan de Sicilia was one of many ships embargoed to enforce the Spanish Armada. She was originally known as Brod Martolosi, and was based out of Ragusa (modern Dubrovnik), and captained by Luka Ivanov Kinkovic. The ship, and several others, were commandeered by the viceroy of Sicily in December 1586. The ship may have seen service with the Spanish in 1587, when the Marquis of Santa Cruz commanded a fleet to the Azores. The ship was renamed the Santa Maria de Gracia y san Juan Bautista, although it was not the only ship to be named after St John the Baptist, and as such, she became known as the San Juan de Sicilia to differentiate it from the others.

San Juan de Sicilia was one of 10 ships that formed the Levant squadron, which was commanded by Martín de Bertendona. The squadron of 10 ships was manned by 767 seamen, and 2,780 soldiers. The San Juan de Sicilia was one of the larger ships of the fleet, with only about 20 of the total 130 ships being larger. The senior officer on board was Diego Tellez Enríquez. It had a crew of 62 seaman, who were mainly Slavonic, under the command of Luka Ivanov Kinkovic. The ship also carried military troops: 135 Sicilians, under the command of Miguel de Garros; 54 Flemings, under the command of Antonio de Valcarel; and 90 Spaniards, under the command of Don Pedro Enriquez.

San Juan de Sicilia was heavily damaged by English ships.

== Scotland and destruction ==
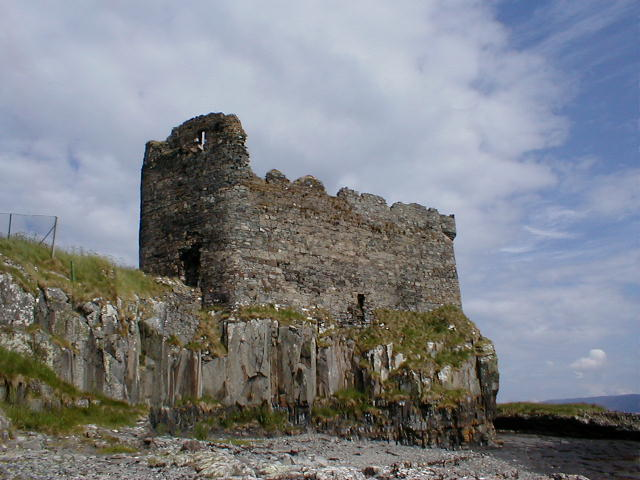
Mingary Castle in 2001

On 23 September 1588, the San Juan de Sicilia was spotted off Islay, and several days later landed in Tobermory Bay, on the Isle of Mull. The ship was not damaged, but the crew were short of water, and the ship's senior officer negotiated for supplies with the local chieftain, Lachlan MacLean of Duart. The agreement was that the ship would be replenished if Spanish troops were to be used to settle some of Duart's outstanding feuds with nearby clans. Diego Tellez Enríquez also received a surety of five hostages from Duart, and for more than a month the San Juan de Sicilia remained in port, as Spanish troops ravaged the lands of Duart's enemies. The troops aided Duart by ravaging the Inner Hebridean islands of Rùm and Eigg, which belonged to MacDonald of Clanranald; and the nearby islands of Canna and Muck, which belonged to MacIan of Ardnamurchan. The troops were later used on the mainland, when they besieged Mingary Castle for three days, although MacLean of Duart was then forced to withdraw.

One of the merchants who provisioned the ship was John Smollet, from Dumbarton, who is now considered to have been an agent for Sir Francis Walsingham. On 5 November 1588, the ship exploded, killing almost everyone on board – including the five hostages. Of the survivors, MacLean of Duart kept about fifty, and used them in his feuding for another year before having them shipped back home to Spain.

== Uncertain identity, Spanish gold ==
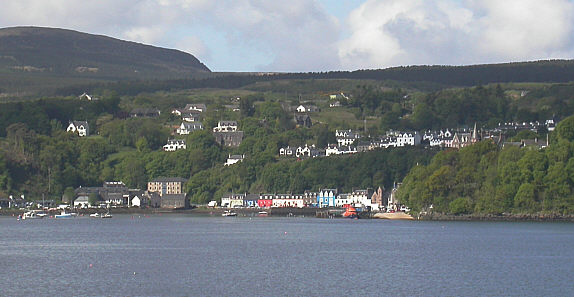
View of Tobermory from the sea

Years after the destruction of San Juan de Sicilia, the ship's identity was forgotten, and rumours of Spanish gold were linked to the wreck. In 1677, the ship was known as "the Armada treasure-ship". It was said to have been originally Florida, and was almirante (flagship) of the Spanish fleet, and was said to have had a treasure of "30,000,000 of money" on board. In fact, almirante of the fleet made it safely back to port, and no ship by the name Florida is known to have taken part in the Spanish Armada. The 'treasure-ship' has also been called Florencia, however the real Florencia also survived the expedition. It wasn't until the turn of the 20th century that serious scholarship cast light onto the ship's true identity.

To complicate matters, there were several ships with the name San Juan – at least nine of them. Another complication is that there are known to have been at least two men with the name Diego Enríquez in the fleet, though one can be distinguished by the name Tellez. In early accounts of the wreck, the captain was called Diego Manrique, although no officer of the fleet is known to have had this name.

== Salvage and artifacts ==
There are known to have been attempts at salvaging the wreck as far back as the 17th century. The first to do so are thought to have been Swedes, who recovered items from the wreck of the Swedish Wasa, lost in Stockholm Harbour in 1628. The earliest diving for treasure was instigated by the Earl of Argyll. The rights to salvage were transferred to the Crown following Argyll's support of the Commonwealth, but were restored to the family sometime afterwards. The rights were again taken away from the family when Argyll supported the Duke of Monmouth in 1685, and James II authorised searches for treasure. The salvage rights were again returned to the family by William II and Mary II, although no further searches took place until 1729, when the 2nd Duke of Argyll employed divers who were previously successful with the wreck of El Gran Grifón. Explosives and winches were employed at this time, to break up the wreck on the bottom of the bay, but no treasure was found. Attempts at salvaging the wreck have continued right up through to the end of 20th century. Among the people who have dived on the wreck include Margaret Naylor, the first female surface-supplied diver.

Over the years numerous objects have been salvaged from the wreck, such as: guns, anchors, pewter platters, and medals. A bronze cannon was recovered from the wreck of the San Juan de Sicilia in about 1740. The gun is specifically a medio cañón, a type of canon that utilised heavy shot that weighed 15–27 Castilian pounds (libras, 16.5 pounds (7.5 kg)-27.5 pounds (12.5 kg)). (Note: One Castilian pound equates to 460 grams.) The gun bears the emblem of Francis I of France, and may have been originally captured by the Spanish at the battle of St Quentin in 1557, or possibly at the battle of Pavia in 1525. The gun is currently located at Inveraray Castle. The gun is estimated to have weighed 3,154 pounds (1,431 kg), its bore is 5.8 inches (15 cm), its length is 112.5 inches (286 cm), and its shot weight is 23 pounds (10 kg) of iron. The gun's bore/length ratio is 1:19.4, and its shot/gun weight is 1:137. (Note: An illustration of the gun can be seen in: Martin; Parker 1988: p. 219, illustration 8.)

== See also ==
- List of ships of the Spanish Armada
