= Hector Odhar Maclean =

Hector Odhar Maclean, 9th Chief

9th Chief of Clan Maclean 5th Laird of Duart
- In office c.1472 – 1496
- Preceded by: Lachlan Og Maclean, 8th Chief, father
- Succeeded by: Lachlan Maclean, 10th Clan Chief, son
- Nickname(s): Hector the Swarthy (English); Eachuinn ni num-bristion (Scottish Gaelic); Eachann Odhar Maclean (Scottish Gaelic)

Hector Odhar Maclean (?–1496), or Eachann Odhar Maclean in Scottish Gaelic, or Hector Maclean the Swarthy, was the 9th Chief of Maclean. He succeeded his father Lachlan Og Maclean upon his death c. 1472. He died in 1496.

== Biography ==
He was the son of Lachlan Og Maclean and has been called Hector Maclean the Swarthy, and sometimes Eachuinn ni num-bristion, on account of his brave and warlike disposition.

=== Battle of Bloody Bay ===
The times were favorable for the display of his inclinations. Angus Og Macdonald, bastard son of the John of Islay, Earl of Ross, the Lord of the Isles, a man of great natural violence, succeeded in establishing a supremacy over his father, among the chiefs descended from the family of the Isles. These chiefs were easily drawn off, because John of Islay, Earl of Ross, in 1476, gave up the earldom of Ross and the lands of Kintyre and Knapdale, and had made improvident grants of lands to the MacLeans, MacLeods, MacNeills, and some smaller tribes.

Angus placed himself at the head of the various branches of Clan Donald, and raised the standard of revolt against his father. John of Islay, Earl of Ross went to Stirling, and there, on account of his son's disobedience, resigned all his possessions to the king, except the Barony of Kinloss in Murray, of Kinnaird in Buchan, and of Cairndonald in the West, which he reserved to support his own grandeur during his lifetime. Angus determined not to surrender any of the hereditary possessions to the king, or even to his father himself. Several expeditions sent by the king against Angus proved unsuccessful. The first, under the Earl of Athole, assisted by the MacKenzies, MacKays, and Frasers, was defeated with great slaughter at Lagebread.

The second expedition, under the Earl of Crawford and Earl of Huntly, made no impression. A third, under Argyle and Athol, accompanied by John, succeeded, through an accommodation, in persuading several tribes to join the royal forces. The two earls appeared to be afraid of attacking Angus, and this expedition resulted in failure. "John, the father, however, undismayed by their pusillanimity, proceeded onward through the Sound of Mull, accompanied by the MacLeans, MacLeods, MacNeills, and others, and having encountered Angus in a bay on the south side of the promontory of Ardnamurchan, a desperate combat ensued, in which Angus was again victorious." This place is near Tobermory, and has since been known as Badh-na-fola, and the conflict is known as the Battle of Bloody Bay.

Hector Odhar not only headed his clan, but also took his hereditary post of lieutenant-general under the John of Islay, Earl of Ross. A naval engagement was fought with the most rancorous animosity, and prodigious slaughter was committed on both sides. Angus Og Macdonald succeeded in taking prisoner both his father and Hector Odhar Maclean. The result of this battle, fought in 1482, was to establish Angus completely in possession of the extensive territories of his clan.

He died in 1496.

== Children ==
- Lachlan Maclean, 10th Clan Chief. Lachlan was an illegitimate son who had the property of 9th Chief entailed to him 1496.

== MacLeans & Leans of Cornwall ==
In the late 15th century two legitimate sons of Hector Odhar, then Lord of Duart Castle on the Isle of Mull, and of the Kingdom of the Western Isles, fought against their father in battle and lost. It is said that Clan Law prescribed that these two must leave the Isles, and be denounced from the Clan. This involved the dropping of the "Mac" from their name (Meaning "son of") and getting as far away, from possible later retribution, as was possible. One son was supposed to have made his way to the East, i.e. Edinburgh or Glasgow, whilst the other was said to have "left a trail a mile wide" and traveled as far south as it was possible to go - to Cornwall.
