= Lachlan Cattanach Maclean, 11th Chief =

Scottish clan chief of Clan MacLean

Lachlan Cattanach Maclean, 11th Clan Chief

11th Clan Chief 7th Laird of Duart
- In office 1513-1523 (10 years)
- Preceded by: Lachlan Maclean, 10th Clan Chief
- Succeeded by: Hector Mor Maclean, 12th Chief

Personal details
- Born: Lachlan Cattanach Maclean circa 1465 Duart Castle, Scotland
- Died: November 10, 1523 (aged 58)
- Spouse(s): Katherine, daughter of Archibald Campbell, 2nd Earl of Argyll
- Children: Hector Mor Maclean, 12th Clan Chief
- Parent: Lachlan Maclean, 10th Clan Chief
- Other names: Lachlan the Shaggy Maclean; Shaggy Lachlan Maclean; Lachlan Cattanach Maclean, 7th of Duart

Lachlan Catanach Maclean (circa 1465 – 10 November 1523) was the 11th Clan Chief of Clan MacLean from 1515 until his murder in 1523.

== Biography ==
"Like several of his contemporaries he is a larger-than-life figure about whom several traditional stories, unusually unflattering caricatures, survive."

It is possible that Maclean was a legitimate son of Lachlan Maclean, 10th Clan Chief, or an illegitimate son of Hector Odhar Maclean. On the assumption that he was the son of Hector, he may have received the appellation Catanach from his mother's people, Clan Chattan, with whom he was fostered. However the word catanach not only means "one of the Clan Chattan," but also hairy, rough, shaggy; hence he was called Lachlan the Shaggy.

Maclean was clan chieftain of the Macleans of Duart and clan chief of the Macleans at a time when the Scottish Kings were asserting their kingship over the Scottish Isles. In 1493 John of Islay, Earl of Ross forfeited his title and was to die in prison. So the Macleans who had risen to prominence as stewards of the Lords of the Isles and had been given lands in Mull, Morvern, Tiree, Islay, Jura, and Lochaber, now owed their position directly to James IV of Scotland.

Maclean had royal support to become clan chief as is shown by the royal charter he received in 1496. However he resisted the efforts of James IV of Scotland to bring the Scottish Isles more firmly under his control. By the end of 1503 Maclean was in open revolt and after attacking and devastating Badenoch, and supporting Donald Dubh MacDonald, an illegitimate grandson of John of Islay, claim to be Lord of the Isles. For these acts James IV of Scotland declared him a traitor and sent a fleet to the isles which captured Maclean's castle of Cairn-na-Burgh on the islet of Cairn na Burgh Mòr in the Treshnish Isles west of Mull. James gave the castle to Colin Campbell, 1st Earl of Argyll. After this defeat Maclean recognised the authority of the King and the charge of treason was dropped.

The death of Lachlan Maclean at the Battle of Flodden on 9 September 1513 placed Lachlan Catanach as chief of the Maclean clan. In 1515 Maclean again rebelled, and the rebellion was also suppressed, after which he became a follower of the Earl of Argyll, a policy that his successors followed up until the start of the Wars of the Three Kingdoms.

== Marriage and children ==
Maclean is said to have had at least six wives or mistresses. To cement his alliance, with the Argylls he married Catherine Campbell (she may have been the inspiration for the poem Glenara by Thomas Campbell), daughter of Archibald Campbell, 2nd Earl of Argyll. Although politically convenient, the marriage was not a success, as she tried to poison him and he arranged to have her drowned by placing her on a rock in the sound of Mull. She was rescued just before the high tide drowned her.

His children include:

- Eachann Mor Maclean, his heir and successor
- Ailean Maclean, second son of Lachlan Catanach, but better known as Ailean nan Sop, or Allan o' the Wisp, because he set fire to buildings with straw, was a very noted character. Many legends have been told concerning him, some of which can not be true, although they may contain a grain of truth.

== Death ==
Sir John Campbell of Cawdor (nobleman) arranged the murder of Lachlan Cattanach Maclean as revenge for the attempted drowning of his wife Catherine, Campbell's sister. Lachlan was killed in Edinburgh on 10 November 1523.
