= Malcolm Maclean, 3rd Chief =

Maolcaluim mac Giliosa Maclean, 3rd Chief

3rd Chief of Clan Maclean
- In office 1300-circa 1320 (20 years)
- Preceded by: Malise mac Gilleain, 2nd Chief, father
- Succeeded by: John Dubh Maclean, 4th Chief, youngest son

Personal details
- Spouse(s): Rioghnach of Carrick, daughter of Gamail of Carrick
- Children: John Dubh Maclean, 4th Clan Chief
- Parent: Malise mac Gilleain
- Relatives: Gilleain na Tuaighe, grandfather
- Known for: Battle of Bannockburn
- Nickname(s): Maol-Calum; Gille-Calum; Servant of Columba; Gilli Colium mac maoiliosa

Malcolm Maclean or Maolcaluim mac Giliosa in Scottish Gaelic (flourished 1310 to 1320), was the 3rd Chief of Clan Maclean. Malcolm's name has been written Maol-Calum and Gille-Calum, which means Servant of Columba. He became the Chief of Clan Maclean on the death of his father in 1300. He was succeeded by John Dubh Maclean, 4th Clan Chief, his youngest son. Though the eldest son inherited in many clans by then (including Robert Bruce, the eldest of four sons of Robert Bruce VI. who became King of Scots, and Alexander Og Macdonald, his father's eldest son who became Lord of the Isles on the death of Angus Mor Macdonald, it was a time of transition concerning the law of primogeniture. He died around 1320.

== Marriage and children ==
He was married to Rioghnach of Carrick, daughter of Gamail, Lord of Carrick and had the following children:

- Donald Maclean had four sons
- Neil Maclean had three sons
- John Dubh Maclean, 4th Clan Chief, the youngest son, who succeeded his father because the law of primogeniture did not apply yet

== Battle of Bannockburn ==
Malcolm, at the head of his clan, fought at the Battle of Bannockburn, in the First War of Scottish Independence on Monday, June 24, 1314. It was at this battle that the power of the English Edwards was broken, and the sovereignty of Scotland once more recognized. Edward Bruce's army consisted of thirty thousand men, while that of Edward II of England has been estimated at over one hundred thousand. The English lost thirty thousand, and the Scots not more than ten thousand. With Edward II of England were all the great English nobles and barons, and their followers, all well equipped. The engagement was commenced by the English, who poured forth their arrows. The Scottish army was arranged in a line consisting of three square columns, the center commanded by the Earl of Moray, the right by Edward Bruce, and the left by James Douglas, Lord of Douglas and Walter Stewart, 6th High Steward of Scotland. The reserve, composed of the men of Argyle, Carrick, Kintyre, and the Isles, formed the fourth line of battle, and was commanded by King Robert I of Scotland in person. In this reserve were five thousand Highlanders, under twenty-one different chiefs, commanded by Angus Og MacDonald, father of John of Islay, Lord of the Isles. The following clans, commanded by their chiefs, fought well: Stewart, MacDonald, MacKay, Maclntosh, MacPherson, Cameron, Sinclair, Drummond, Campbell, Menzies, MacLean, Sutherland, Robertson, Grant, Fraser, MacFarlane, Ross, MacGregor, Munro, MacKenzie, and MacQuarrie.

The Clans Cumming, MacDougall of Lorn, MacNab, and a few others were present, but on the English side. As the battle raged, Robert the Bruce brought up the whole of his reserve, which completely engaged the four battles of the Scots in one line. The noise of the battle, as described by an eyewitness, was awful. There was the clanging of arms, knights shouting their war-cry, arrows maddening the horses, banners rising and sinking, the ground covered with gore, shreds of pennons, broken armor, and rich scarfs soiled with blood and clay; and amidst the din was heard the groans of the wounded and dying. Step by step, the Scots gained ground. In a critical moment, the camp followers, desiring to see the battle, appeared over the hill, and were mistaken by the English for Scotch reinforcements. Immediately dismay spread through the English ranks; noticing this, the Scots made a fresh onslaught which broke the English army into fragments. The flight at once became general, and the slaughter began. In the thickest of the fight, the highland clans plied their battle-axes with terrible effect. This did not escape the attention of the watchful Bruce. To show his appreciation for the great service, he assigned to Angus and his descendants forever the honorable position of the right flank of the royal army.
