= Lachlan Bronneach Maclean =

Lachlan Bronnach MacLean

7th Chief of Clan MacLean 3rd Laird of Duart
- In office 1411-1472 circa (61 years)
- Preceded by: Eachuinn Ruadh nan cath Maclean
- Succeeded by: Lachlan Og Maclean, son

Personal details
- Spouse: Margaret Stewart
- Children: Lachlan Og Maclean
- Parent: Eachuinn Ruadh nan cath Maclean

Lachlan Bronnach MacLean, was the 7th Chief of Clan MacLean.

== Biography ==
Lachlan, seventh chief of MacLean, received the sobriquet of "Bronnach", or swag-bellied, on account of his corpulence. He was with his father on the fatal field of Harlaw, where he was made prisoner by Alexander Stewart, Earl of Mar (Note: According to some accounts his estates were managed by his uncle John Maclean during his imprisonment, while others state it was his brother, John Dubh Maclean; the confusion results from both having the name John Maclean). During his captivity, he became acquainted with the earl's daughter, the Lady Margaret, whom he afterward married. It is not probable that he remained in confinement for any considerable length of time. He did not possess the same war-like character that distinguished his father. He appears neither to have sought, nor avoided war, but was ready for action when the time arrived.

His name, does not come prominently forward until the year 1427, when war was brought through the actions of King James I. James summoned a parliament to meet him at Inverness, in 1427, at which the Highland chiefs were invited to attend. As the chiefs entered the hall in which parliament was assembled, each was immediately arrested and placed in irons in different parts of the building, not one being permitted to communicate with any of the others (Note: Among the number was Alexander MacDonald, 3rd Lord of the Isles, and his mother, the Countess of Ross). Two of the chiefs were immediately beheaded (Note: Alexander MacGorrie of the Siol Gorrie, and MacGorrie's ally), and the rest sent to various prisons, where after a time some were liberated, and the rest put to death.

In 1429, Lachlan was summoned by the young Lord of the Isles, to assist him in avenging this unparalleled outrage. Joined by the Lord's other vassals, they advanced against the town of Inverness, which they burnt to the ground; they also laid waste to certain crown lands. King James I immediately placed himself at the head of a large army, and launched a surprise attack; Alexander, Lachlan, and Alexander's other vassals, were forced to surrender unconditionally, and were imprisoned in Tantallon Castle.

In 1431, in the absence of their lord (Alexander of Islay), Clan Donald had their revenge at the Battle of Inverlochy where, led by Alexander's cousin, Donald Balloch, Lord of Dunyvaig and the Glens, they defeated the royal army. John Dubh, second son of Hector Roy, and the brother of Lachlan Bronneach, was an active participant in that battle. There are conflicting accounts of Lachlan's whereabouts in 1431 when the Battle of Inverlochy was fought and won by the Lordship of the Isles. While some sources say that at that time he was imprisoned at Tantallon Castle with Alexander of Islay, Lord of the Isles, others say he fought with Donald Balloch, who led the battle for the Lordship. But still others say he fought with the Earl of Mar, against the Lordship, owing to his wife being Mar’s daughter. That may have been the case because the Macleans, who fought with Donald Balloch at Inverlochy, were led by Lachlan’s son John Maclean of Coll, who Alexander, Lord of the Isles, when he was released from Tantallon, duly rewarded.

== Marriage and children ==
Before marriage he had a child with the daughter of MacEarchorn MacLean of Kingerloch:

- Donald Maclean, 1st Laird of Ardgour sometimes called Mac-Mhic-Eachainn Chinnghearloch. He was born out of wedlock and brought up among his mother's people.

By his first wife, Margaret, daughter of the Earl of Mar, Alexander Stewart, Earl of Mar, he had:

- Lachlan Og Maclean, his heir and successor as 8th Clan Chief.

By his second wife, Fionnaghal, daughter of William MacLeod of Harris, he had two sons:

- Neil Maclean of Ross
- John Garbh Maclean, 1st Laird of Coll
- Finvola Maclean, who married Celestine Macdonald, founder of Clan MacDonald of Lochalsh. Celestine was the son of Alexander, Lord of the Isles and Earl of Ross.
