= Gillean of the Battle Axe =

Scottish clan chief from 1210 to 1263

1st Chief of Clan Maclean
- In office 1210-1263 (53 years)
- Succeeded by: Malise mac Gilleain, son

Personal details
- Children: Malise mac Gilleain; Bristi mac Gilleain; Gillebride mac Gilleain
- Parent: Rath

Gillean of the Battle Axe, or Gilleain na Tuaighe in Scottish Gaelic, was the eponymous ancestor of Clan Maclean and Clan Maclaine of Lochbuie. He is considered the 1st Chief of Clan Maclean.

== Biography ==
He was born to a man named Rath and flourished around the year 1250.

He was known as Gilleain na Tuaighe, from his carrying, as his weapon and constant companion, a battle axe. He was a man of mark and distinction. The following anecdote is related of him, which probably accounts for the origin of the Maclean crest, which consists of a battle-ax between a laurel and cypress branch, and is still used on the coat of-arms:

He was on one occasion engaged, with other lovers of the chase, in a stag-hunt on the mountain of Bein 'tsheata, and having wandered from the rest of the party in pursuit of game, the mountain became suddenly covered with a heavy mist, and he lost his way. For three days he wandered about, unable to recover his route, and on the fourth, exhausted by fatigue, he entered a cranberry bush, where, fixing the handle of his battle axe in the earth, he laid himself down. On the evening of the same day his friends discovered the head of the battle-ax above the bush, and found its owner, with his arms round the handle, stretched, in a state of insensibility, on the ground.

== Issue ==
Gillean of the Battle Axe had three sons:

- Malise mac Gilleain
- Bristi mac Gilleain
- Gillebride mac Gilleain
