= Malise mac Gilleain =

Malise mac Gilleain, 2nd Chief

2nd Chief of Clan Maclean
- In office 1263-1300 (37 years)
- Preceded by: Gilleain na Tuaighe, 1st Chief, father
- Succeeded by: Maolcaluim mac Giliosa Maclean, 3rd Chief, son

Personal details
- Born: circa 1250
- Died: 1300
- Children: Maolcaluim mac Giliosa Maclean
- Parent: Gilleain na Tuaighe
- Known for: War with Haakon IV of Norway
- Nickname(s): Maoliosa; Malo-Iosa; Gille-Iosa; Servant of Jesus; Malise son of Gilleain

Malise mac Gilleain (circa 1250 – 1300) was the second chief of Clan Maclean. He was loyal to Alexander III of Scotland and assisted in the expulsion of Haakon IV of Norway from Scotland.

== Early years ==
He was the son of Gillean of the Battle Axe, and was variously called Maoliosa, or Maol-Iosa, or Gille-Iosa, which means the servant of Jesus.

== War with Norway ==
From the Norwegian account Alexander III of Scotland sent an ambassador to Haakon IV of Norway, demanding that he give up the territories in the Hebrides, which Magnus III of Norway had unjustly wrested from Malcolm IV of Scotland. Haakon IV of Norway refused and then the ambassador offered to purchase the territory and this was also refused. In 1263, Haakon IV of Norway assembled an expeditionary force, declaring the expedition was intended against that part of Scotland which bordered the western seas, and the object was to revenge certain inroads made by the Scotch into his dominions. The expedition was commanded by Haakon IV of Norway in person. The armament is described as mighty and splendid; the ships being many, large, and well-appointed. When the expedition arrived at the island of Kerrera, it was joined by King Dugal, predecessor of the MacDougalls of Dunolly, with other Hebrideans. This increased the armament to one hundred vessels, for the most part large, and well provided with both men and arms. There the forces were divided, fifty ships being sent south to the Mull of Kintyre to plunder. Haakon IV of Norway then sailed south to Gigha, where he anchored, but soon after proceeded to the Mull of Kintyre. The Norwegians committed great depredations, both in the islands and on the mainland. The Scottish monarch, however, was not idle. He assembled his forces, and proceeded against the invaders. The two armies met at Largs, on the coast of Ayrshire, on October 2, 1263. The Norwegian army, although very large, could not all be brought into action, because a violent tempest arose, which prevented the greater part of the army from being brought ashore. In the Scottish army was a body of fifteen hundred horsemen, mounted on Spanish horses, armed, both horse and man, from head to heel, in complete mail. The foot soldiers were well-accoutered, and in addition to the long spears of the Saxons, they carried the Norman bow. This memorable engagement was commenced by the Scots. The right wing, composed of the men of Argyle, Lennox, Athole, and Galloway, was commanded by Alexander Stewart, 4th High Steward of Scotland, while Patrick III, Earl of Dunbar, commanded the left, composed of the men of Fife, Stirling, Berwick, and Lothian. The king, in person, commanded the center, which was composed of the men from Ross, Perth, Angus, Mar, Mearns, Moray, Inverness, and Caithness. Haco also commanded his center, which brought the kings close together in combat. The High Steward turned the enemy's left, and by an adroit maneuver wheeled back on the rear of Haakon IV of Norway's center, which forced Haakon to retreat from the field, leaving from sixteen to twenty-four thousand of his men on the field, while the Scottish loss did not exceed five thousand. Malise son of Gilleain, must have performed prodigies of valor in this action, for he has received honorable mention.

== Death ==
He died in the year 1300, and was succeeded by his son, Malcolm Maclean, 3rd Clan Chief.
