= Clan Maclean =

Highland Scottish clan

- Clann 'IllEathain, Clann MhicIllEathain, Na Leathanaich
- Crest: A tower embattled Argent
- Motto: Virtue Mine Honour (My Virtues are my Honour)
- Slogan: Bàs no Beatha ("Death or victory")

Profile
- Region: Highlands
- District: Inner Hebrides
- Plant badge: crowberry or holly

Chief
- Lachlan Hector Charles Maclean of Duart and Morven
- The 12th Baronet of Morvern
- Seat: Duart Castle
Septs of Clan Maclean
Beath, Beaton, Black, Garvie, Lean, MacBeath, MacBheath, MacBeth, MacClean, MacEachan, Macilduy, McCaldon, McLean, McLane, MacLergain, Maclergan, MacRankin, MacVeagh, MacVeigh, MacVey, Rankin, Maclin, Macklin
Clan branches
MacLean of Duart (chiefs)
MacLean of Ardgour (senior cadets)
MacLean of Torloisk
MacLean of Coll
MacLean of Dochgarroch (Clan Tearlach)
See also:
MacLean Baronets
Allied clans
Clan Maclaine of Lochbuie
Clan MacLeod
Clan Chattan for the Macleans of Dochgarroch
Clan Mackenzie
Clan Maclachlan
Clan MacNeil
Clan Lamont
Clan Matheson
Clan MacLea
Clan MacQuarrie
Rival clans
Clan Donald
Clan Campbell
Clan Cameron
Clan Irvine
Clan MacKinnon
Clan MacInnes
Kindreds
Beaton medical kindred

Clan Maclean (/mækˈleɪn/; Scottish Gaelic: Clann 'IllEathain [kʰl̪ˠãn̪ˠ iˈʎɛhɛɲ]) is a Highlands Scottish clan. They are one of the oldest clans in the Highlands and owned large tracts of land in Argyll as well as the Inner Hebrides. Many early Macleans became famous for their honour, strength and courage in battle. They were involved in clan skirmishes with the Mackinnons, Camerons, MacDonalds and Campbells, as well as all of the Jacobite risings.

== History ==
=== Origins of the Clan ===
There are several different origins for the surname Maclean, however, the clan surname is an anglicisation of the Scottish Gaelic MacGilleEathain. This was the patronymic form of the personal name meaning 'Servant of Saint John', thus 'Son of the Servant of [St] John'. The clan's rise to power began in 852 with a Papal Bull of Charter and Protection for the Iona Abbey, issued by Pope Leo IV. Marriages with Clan MacDonald in the late 1200s, Clan Bruce in the 1300s, and Clan MacKenzie in the 1400s brought Clan Maclean into the Scottish royal sphere.

==== Early Clan Chiefs ====
The founder of the clan was a Scottish warlord named Gillean of the Battle Axe (1210–1263). There are stories of Gillean being descended from the FitzGerald dynasty. He was a judex (judge) and councillor to King David I of Scots. Gillean fought at the Battle of Largs in 1263 during the Scottish–Norwegian War, in which the Scottish were victorious.

Gillean's son Malise mac Gilleain (from the Gaelic Maoliosa 'Servant of Jesus') was thought by some to have taken the name Gillemor in 1263 and is also said to have led his followers at the Battle of Largs in 1263. He wrote his name as "Gillemor Mcilyn, County of Perth" (indicating 'Gillemor Son of [Gil]lean') on the third Ragman Rolls of 1296, swearing fealty to Edward I of England.

Gillean's grandson, Malcom, was the third chief. He fought at the Battle of Bannockburn in 1314 in the Wars of Scottish Independence. He commanded troops alongside Robert Bruce and over a dozen other Scottish clans to victory over the English. He died during the reign of King David Bruce and had three sons: John (Iain), Donald, and Neil.

Iain Dhu Maclean, son of Malcom, was the fourth chief. He settled on the Isle of Mull. One of his sons was Lachainn Lubanach (Lachlan) who was the progenitor of the Macleans of Duart and the other son was Eachainn Reafanach (Hector) who was the progenitor of the Clan Maclaine of Lochbuie. The Macleans of Duart married into the family of John of Islay, Lord of the Isles (chief of Clan Donald). By the end of the 15th century, the Macleans owned the isles of Mull, Tiree, Islay, and Jura, as well as the mainland provinces of Knapdale and Morvern in Argyll, and Lochaber in what was later Inverness-shire.

=== The Early Macleans at Duart ===
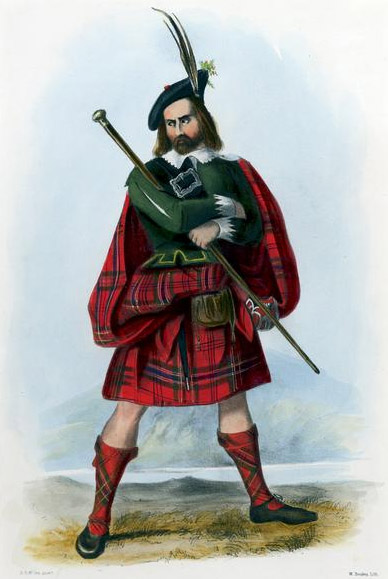
"Mac Lean" illustration by R. R. McIan, from James Logan's The Clans of the Scottish Highlands, 1845

By the 14th century, the Clan Maclean had become a dominant force in the Western Isles. In about 1364 Lachlan Lùbanach Maclean (1325-1405) of Duart, 5th Chief, solidified the Maclean alliance with the Macdonalds through marriage. His bride, Mary Macdonald, was not only the daughter of John Macdonald, first Lord of the Isles, but also the granddaughter of Robert II, King of Scots. The families were close enough related that the approval of the church was sought. The papal dispensation issued by Pope Urban V on 3 May of 1367 approving the already consummated marriage is the first mention of a Maclean in any official records.. The papal dispensation blessed the marriage retroactively as insurance that it could not be annulled for political purposes. Mary's marriage dowry included Duart Castle and much of Mull. Lachlan Lùbanach also was granted the hereditary position of Lieutenant-General of the Isles. He was recognized as the superior Maclean on Mull by the Lord of the Isles. Hector (1328-1407), his younger brother, was in the late 1300s given Lochbuie by the Lord of the Isles.

=== Fifteenth century and clan conflicts ===
During the 14th and 15th centuries many battles were fought between the Clan Maclean and Clan Mackinnon.

==== Battle of Harlaw ====
In 1411, Clan Maclean fought with Donald Macdonald, Lord of the Isles, to claim the earldom of Ross, which was his by right of his wife, Mariota Leslie, countess of Ross. Robert Stewart, the ambitious Duke of Albany, had denied Donald's claim because he wanted Ross for himself. (The young King of Scots, James I, was being held prisoner of the English king, Henry IV, and Albany did nothing to seek his release.) The Battle of Harlaw was fought near Inverurie in Aberdeenshire on 24 July 1411 against a mounted army of knights led by Alexander Stewart, Earl of Mar. The Macleans were led by Hector Roy Maclean, "Red Hector of the Battles", the 6th Chief, and nephew of Donald Macdonald. Hector commanded the right flank of Donald Macdonald's army. Hector engaged in single combat with the chief of Clan Irvine, Sir Alexander Irvine. After a legendary struggle both died of the wounds inflicted upon each other.

===== Origins of the Macleans of the North (Clan Tearlach) =====
Tearlach [Charles] Maclean was the eldest son of Hector Maclean, 1st of Lochbuie, brother of Lachlan Maclean, 1st of Duart. Tearlach was part of the vanguard, but after this battle he sought protection within the Clan Chattan Confederation. His son Hector subsequently married a daughter of the Chief of the Mackintoshes. Despite the active support of Clan Chattan, these Macleans lost ownership of Urquhart Castle by 1509, and settled nearby at Dochgarroch, though they still managed to lease much of Urquhart. In 1609 Alexander Maclean of Dochgarroch signed the Clan Chattan Bond.

==== Battle of Corpach ====
The Battle of Corpach was fought in 1439 between the Clan Maclean and the Clan Cameron.

==== Battle of Bloody Bay ====
In 1484 the Clan Maclean fought in the Battle of Bloody Bay on the side of the Lord of the Isles, chief of Clan Donald.

In 1493 the Lordship of the Isles was abolished, and Duart and Lochbuie Macleans held their lands by charter directly from the king; thus Lochbuie became a clan independent of Duart.

=== Sixteenth century and the Anglo-Scottish Wars ===
In 1513 during the Anglo-Scottish Wars, Lachlan Maclean of Duart was killed at the Battle of Flodden. The clan extended its influence to other Hebridean islands such as Tiree and Islay, and onto the mainland. In 1560 the Clan Maclean, joined by their allies the Clan Mackay and Clan MacLeod, became part of the Gallowglass, who were ferocious mercenaries of Norse-Gaelic descent who served in Ireland for the chief of Tyrone, Shane O'Neill.

The rising power of the Clan Campbell during the sixteenth century brought them into opposition with the Macleans. Several marriages were arranged between Macleans and Campbells to avoid feuding; however one of these went badly wrong when chief Lachlan Maclean married Lady Elizabeth Campbell, daughter of the Earl of Argyll, chief of Clan Campbell. The match was not a happy one, and Maclean took drastic action by marooning his wife on a rock in the sea, leaving her to drown. However she was rescued by some passing fishermen who took her back to her kin, and Maclean was later killed by her brother in Edinburgh in 1523.

The Battle of the Western Isles was fought in 1586, on the island of Jura, between the Clan MacDonald of Sleat and the Clan Maclean. In 1588 the Clan Maclean attempted to capture Mingarry Castle seat of the chief of the Clan MacDonald of Ardnamurchan, using Spanish mercenaries from the San Juan de Sicilia.

Two common features of the Macleans and the Campbells were their Protestant faith and their dislike for the MacDonalds. Sir Lachland Maclean harried the MacDonalds of Islay, causing so much carnage that both he and the MacDonald chief were declared outlaws in 1594 by the Privy Council. However Lachlan redeemed himself when in the same year he fought for the king at the Battle of Glenlivet, on the side of the Earl of Argyll and Clan Campbell, against the Earl of Huntly and Clan Gordon.

=== Sir Lachlan Mòr Maclean ===
The Battle of Traigh Ghruinneart was fought on 5 August 1598 between the Clan Donald and Clan Maclean on the Isle of Islay. Chief Sir Lachlan Mòr Maclean was killed; After his death in 1598, his sons took revenge on his suspected murderers, the MacDonalds, by carrying out a massacre of the people of Islay which lasted for three days. After obtaining "Letters of Fire and Sword" he was assisted in this by the MacLeods, MacNeils, and Camerons. The quarrel between the Macleans and the Macdonalds of Islay and Kintyre was, at the outset, merely a dispute as to the right of occupancy of the crown lands called the Rinns of Islay, but it soon involved these clans in a long and bloody feud, and eventually led to the near destruction of them both. The Macleans, who were in possession, claimed to hold the lands in dispute as tenants of the Crown, but the Privy Council decided that Macdonald of Islay was the real Crown tenant.

=== Seventeenth century and Civil War ===
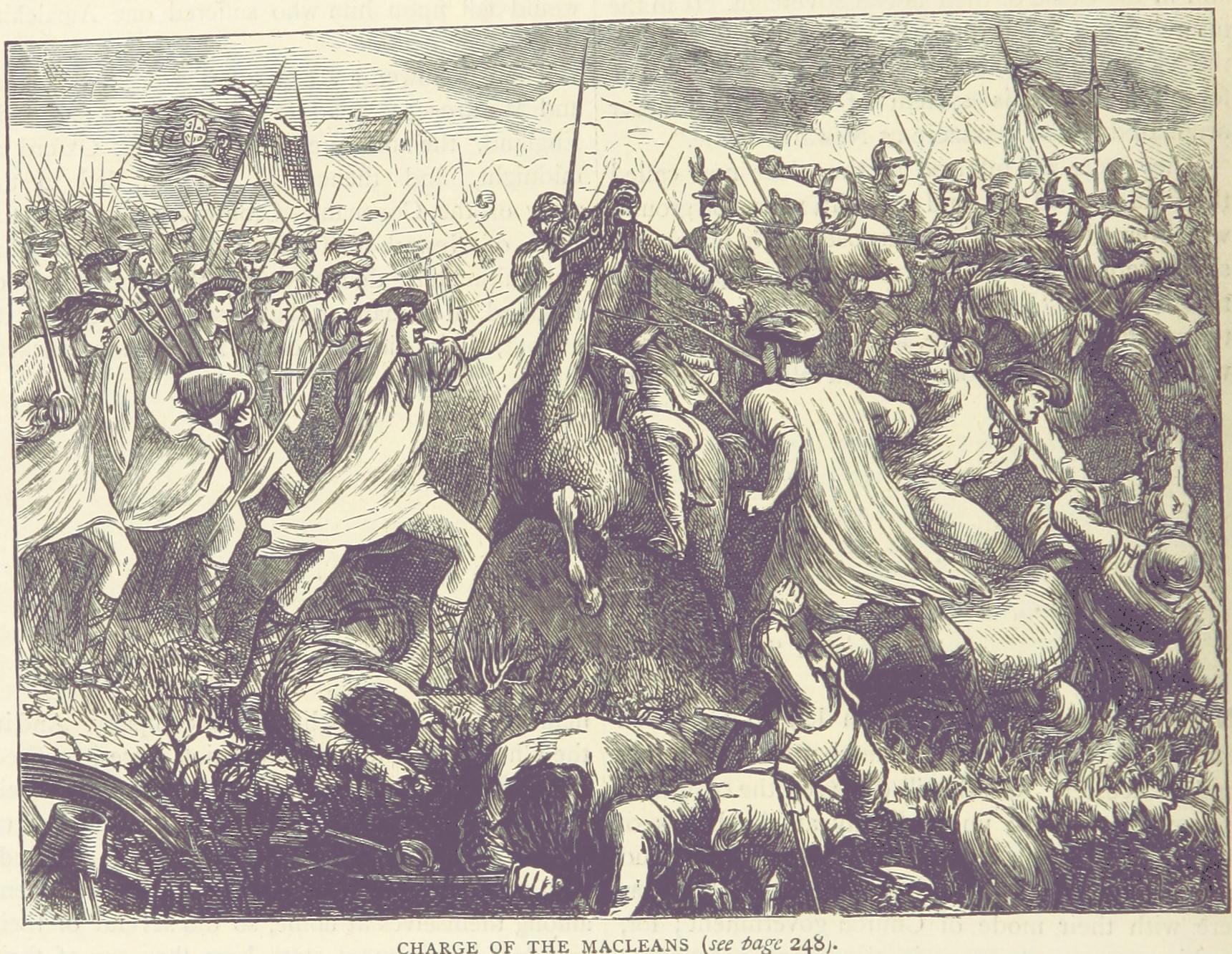
The charge of the Macleans at Kilsyth

On 3 September 1631 Sir Lachlan Maclean was created a Baronet of Nova Scotia. Later, during the Scottish Civil War, he was devoted to Charles I of England and called out his clan to fight for James Graham, 1st Marquis of Montrose who was the king's captain general. The Clan Maclean fought as royalists at the Battle of Inverlochy (1645), Battle of Auldearn and Battle of Kilsyth, alongside men from Clan MacDonald, and other allies from Ireland raised by Alasdair MacColla. Their enemy was the Scottish Argyll government forces of Clan Campbell, led by Archibald Campbell, 1st Marquess of Argyll. Through cunning tactics the Royalist force of 1500 MacDonalds and Macleans defeated the Argyll Campbell force of 3000.

In 1647 the Macleans' Duart Castle was attacked and besieged by the Argyll government troops of Clan Campbell, but they were defeated and driven off by the royalist troops of Clan Maclean. The Battle of Inverkeithing was fought in 1651, and Sir Hector Maclean, 18th chief was killed.

Archibald Campbell the 9th Earl, son of the Marquess of Argyll, invaded the Clan Maclean lands on the Isle of Mull and garrisoned Duart Castle in 1678. The Campbells had control of Duart and most of the Maclean estates by 1679. When the Stuarts again called for support, the Macleans hurried to their standard and Sir John Maclean, fifth Baronet fought at the Battle of Killiecrankie in 1689, in support of John Graham, 1st Viscount of Dundee.

=== Eighteenth century and the Jacobite risings ===
The Clan Maclean supported the Jacobite rising of 1715 and their chief, Sir Hector Maclean, was created Lord Maclean in the Jacobite peerage in 1716. However, the chief was exiled to France, where he founded, and was the first Grand Master of, the Grand Lodge of Freemasons in Paris. General Wade's report on the Highlands in 1724, estimated the clan strength at 150 men. Hector returned for the Jacobite rising of 1745 but was captured and imprisoned in the Tower of London until 1747. He died in 1750 in Rome. During the rising of 1745 the clan had been led by Maclean of Drimmin who was killed at the Battle of Culloden. Duart Castle then fell into ruin.

After the defeat of the Jacobites, the Macleans then served Great Britain with distinction. From that time onwards, all of the chiefs have been soldiers. Sir Fitzroy Maclean, the tenth Baronet, fought at the Battle of Sevastopol.

Allan Maclean of Torloisk fought at the Battle of Culloden. He later commanded the 84th Regiment of Foot (Royal Highland Emigrants) in the Battle of Quebec.

Allan McLane served in the American Revolution.

== Castles ==
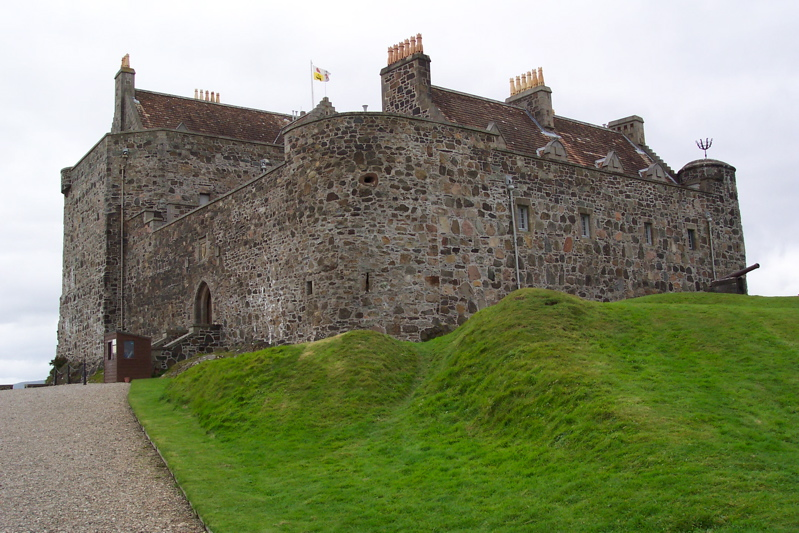
Duart Castle, historic seat of the chiefs of the Clan Maclean

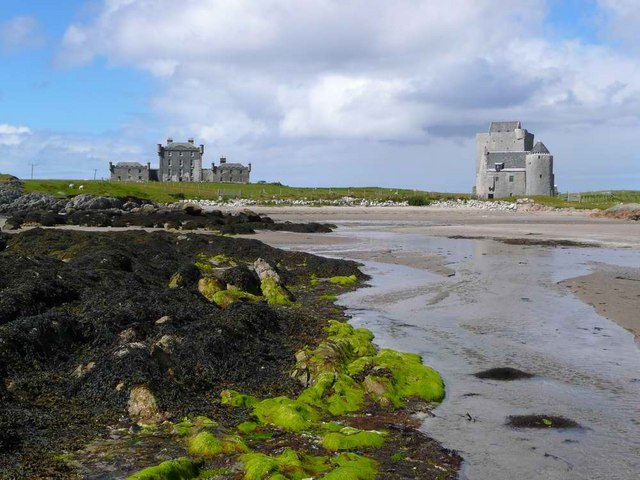
New Breachacha Castle (left) and Old Breachacha Castle (right), both once held by the Macleans

Castles held by the Clan Maclean have included amongst others:

- Duart Castle on the Isle of Mull is the historic seat of the chiefs of the Clan Maclean. The castle is perched on a rock guarding the Sound of Mull. Dating from the thirteenth century it consists of a strong curtain wall as well as a substantial tower or keep that was added in about 1390. There are also later ranges that were built within the courtyard. Duart Castle was abandoned after the Jacobite rising of 1745 and it then became derelict and roofless. However, in 1911 it was acquired by Sir Fitzroy Maclean, 10th Baronet, chief of Clan Maclean who restored it. The castle is still owned by the Macleans of Duart although they now live in Perthshire. The castle is open to the public in the summer. The exterior of Duart Castle was used in the film "Entrapment" with Catherine Zeta-Jones and Sean Connery, whose mother, Euphemia McBain "Effie" – née McLean – was a Maclean.
- Ardgour House, built in 1765, lies on the shores of Loch Linnhe on land wrested from the McMasters in the 1430s. The first Maclean of Ardgour, "Strong Donald the Hunter", was the son of the 7th Chief of Clan Maclean from Duart. Ewan Maclean, 2nd of Ardgour was killed at the Battle of Bloody Bay in about 1482. They followed James Graham, 1st Marquess of Montrose, but Allen, the seventh lord, was pardoned. The Ardgour Macleans did not take part in the Jacobite risings and now live at Salachan at Ardgour. Sold by the Macleans in 1996, Ardgour House is currently let as self-catering accommodation
- Aros Castle on the Isle of Mull was originally built by the Clan MacDougall, and was then held by the Clan Donald, Lord of the Isles before passing to the Macleans after 1493.
- Aros Castle, Glengarrisdale, on the island of Jura, was held by the Macleans who came into possession of the north part of Jura. The southern part of Jura was originally held by the MacDonalds, but by 1620 it had passed to the Clan Campbell who complained that they were being harassed by the Macleans. This resulted in a battle in 1647 when the Campbells surprised the Macleans at Glen Garrisdale and killed many of them. There is a tradition that the severed head and two limb bones of one of the Macleans adorned a cairn near Maclean's Skull Cave. The castle was still in use in 1690, when the Campbell constable took action against the Macleans who had not taken the Oath of Allegiance to King William.
- Breachacha Castle, on the island of Coll, was held by the MacDonalds, then by the Clan MacNeil and then by the Macleans. In 1431 it was seized by Maclean of Coll, but they feuded with the Macleans of Duart, who in 1578 captured the castle. In 1679 Donald Maclean of Coll garrisoned it against the Clan Campbell chief, the Earl of Argyll. New Breachacha Castle was built nearby in 1750 and the old castle then became ruinous. Dr Johnston and Boswell visited the castle in 1773. By 1886 the old castle had passed to the Stewarts of Glenbuchie, but it was bought by a descendant of the Macleans in 1965.
- Cairnburgh Castle, Treshnish Isles, Argyll, was originally held by the MacDougalls, then by the MacDonalds and then by the Macleans of Duart. One story is that the chief Maclean of Duart imprisoned the chief of the Clan Maclaine of Lochbuie in the castle to prevent him producing an heir, and that Maclaine's only female companion was an old, not overly pleasing woman, whom he made pregnant. Maclaine was murdered, but the woman escaped and bore a son who recovered Lochbuie. In 1504 James IV of Scotland had the castle besieged when it was held by Lachlan Maclean. In 1647 the castle surrendered to the Covenanter General, David Leslie, 1st Lord Newark, and in the 1650s many of the books and records that had been rescued from Iona were destroyed in a siege by Oliver Cromwell's forces. The castle held out against attacks by the Campbells in 1679 but was surrendered in 1692. The castle was garrisoned during both the Jacobite rising of 1715 and 1745.
- Caisteal nan Con (castle of dogs), near Lochaline, was held by the Macleans of Duart and is said to have been used as a hunting lodge by those occupying Aros Castle.
- Caisteal nan Con, Isle of Torsa, was originally held by the Campbells, then the MacDougalls and then the Macleans. It was probably also a hunting lodge.
- Castle Loch Heylipol, Tiree, was originally held by the MacDonalds and then by the Macleans, who were besieged in it by the Campbells in 1678–79.
- Castle Spioradain, near Inverness, site of a castle formerly on an island that was held by the Macleans of Dochgarroch in around 1420. The name means castle of spirits, and the story goes that during a feud between the Macleans and the Clan Cameron, several Camerons were executed and their bodies were hung from the walls. The ghosts of the dead are said to have terrorised the castle and the area. The site was destroyed when the Caledonian Canal was built and human bones were found.
- Dochgarroch, near Inverness, site of a castle held from the sixteenth century by the Macleans who were known as the Clan Tearlach and who were allied to the Chattan Confederation. This clan of Macleans fought as Jacobites at the Battle of Killiecrankie in 1689 and at the Battle of Sheriffmuir in 1715. This line now live near Glen Urquhart and also near Edinburgh.
- Drimnin Castle, near Lochaline, Morvern, was held by the Macleans of Coll in the sixteenth century, but was demolished in the 1830s. Maclean of Drimnin led the clan during the Jacobite rising of 1745 and was killed at the Battle of Culloden.
- Dun Chonnuill Castle, on one of the Garvellachs, Argyll, is a ruinous castle that was originally held by the MacDougalls, then by the MacDonalds and then by the Macleans who now live at Strachur House in Argyll and are hereditary keepers and captains of Dunconnel.
- Eilean Amalaig Castle, Isle of Mull, is where the Macleans of Duart marshalled their birlinns or galleys.
- Glensanda Castle, near Lochaline, is a ruinous castle that was originally held by the MacMasters but passed to the Macleans in the fifteenth century.
- Gorm Castle or Loch Gorm Castle on the Isle of Islay was originally held by the MacDonalds and then briefly by the Macleans. The castle and island later passed to the Campbells and was still in use in 1745, but is now very ruinous.
- Kinlochaline Castle, near Lochaline, was originally held by the Clan MacInnes but passed to the Macleans after the MacInnes chief was murdered along with his sons by the Clan Mackinnon.
- Strachur Castle in Argyll was later replaced by Strachur House and is now occupied by the Macleans of Dunconnel, hereditary keepers of Dun Chonnuill Castle. One of these was created a Baronet in 1957.
- Tarbert Castle, Tarbert, Argyll and Bute: although a royal castle, the lands were held by the Clan MacAlister and then by the Macleans.
- Torloisk House, on the Isle of Mull, was held by the Macleans of Torloisk.

== Clan Chiefs ==
=== Chief ===
- Sir Lachlan Hector Charles Maclean of Duart and Morvern Bt, CVO, 28th Clan Chief and 12th Baronet of Morvern.

Maclean was born on 25 August 1942, the elder child of Charles Maclean and his wife, Elizabeth Mann. He was educated at Eton. On 2 November 1966, he married Mary Helen Gordon (1943 – 2007), and the couple had five children. On the death of his father in 1990, he succeeded him as a Baronet of Nova Scotia and as Chief of the Name and Arms of Maclean. On 8 September 2010, he married Rosemary Matheson.

=== Chieftains ===
- Robin Maclean of Ardgour
- The Very Rev Canon Allan M. Maclean of Dochgarroch
- Sir Charles Edward Maclean of Dunconnel Bt, 2nd Baronet of Strachur and Glensluain, Baron Strachur, and 16th Hereditary Keeper and Captain of Dunconnel in the Isles of The Sea
- Nicolas Maclean of Pennycross
- Richard Compton Maclean of Torloisk
- Malcolm Fraser Maclean of Kingairloch

== Septs ==
Septs are family names associated with a particular clan. Other family names associated with the clan include Auchaneson, Beath, Beaton, Black, Clanachan, Dowart, Dowie, Duart, Duie, Garvie, Gillan, Gillon, Gilzean, Hoey, Huie, Lane, Lean, Leitch, MacBeath, MacBeth, MacBheath, MacCormick, MacEachan, Macfadin, MacFadyen, Macfadzean, Macfergan, Macgeachan, MacGilvra, Macildowie, Macilduy, Macilvera, MacKlin, MacLergain, Maclergan, MacPhaiden, MacRankin, MacVeagh, MacVey, Paden, Patten, Rankin, and Rankine.

== Clan profile ==
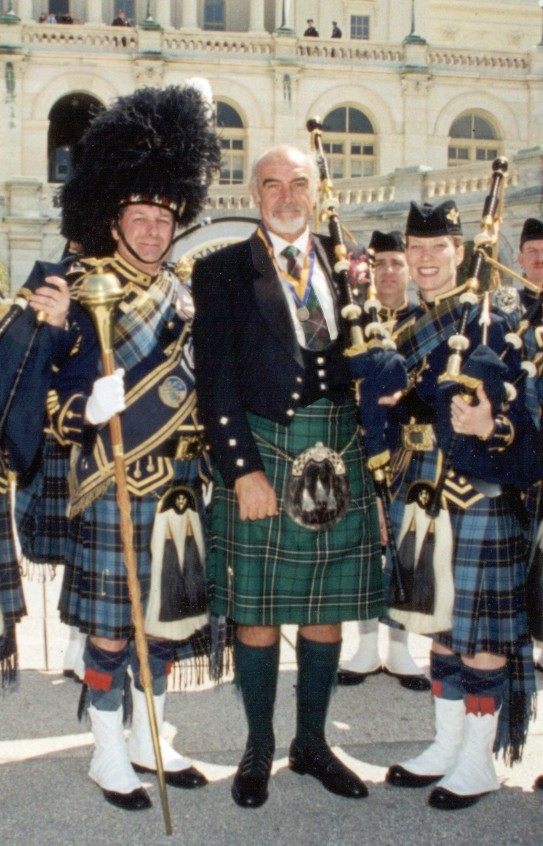
Sean Connery wearing a kilt with the Clan Maclean hunting tartan; his mother was a Maclean

=== Symbols ===
Members of Clan Maclean show their allegiance to their clan and their chief by wearing a crest badge which bears the heraldic crest and heraldic motto of the clan chief. The blazon of the heraldic crest within a clan member's crest badge is A tower embattled Argent. The heraldic motto upon the crest badge is VIRTUE MINE HONOUR.

Long before crest badges were used by members of clans, it is said that plants were used as badges. These were worn in bonnets and also used as a banner and attached to a pole or spear. The clan badge attributed to Clan Maclean is Crowberry.

There are two slogans attributed to Clan Maclean. Slogans are sometimes said to be war cries; at other times they are said to be rallying points for the clan. Slogans used by clans generally appear as a second motto within the chief's arms. Slogans of Clan Maclean include: Bàs no Beatha (from Scottish Gaelic: "Death or life") and Fear eile airson Eachann (from Scottish Gaelic: "Another for Hector").

== Maclean Arms ==
Arms of Maclean of Duart

Maclean
of Duart

Arms of Macklean

Macklean
Baron (Sweden)

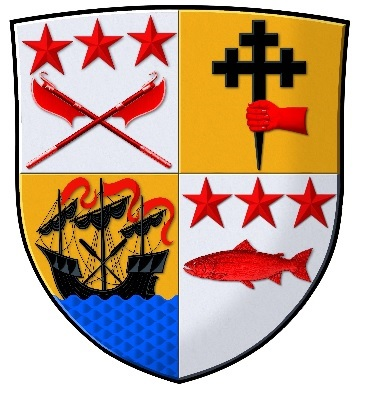
Arms of Maclean of Denboig

MacLean
of Denboig

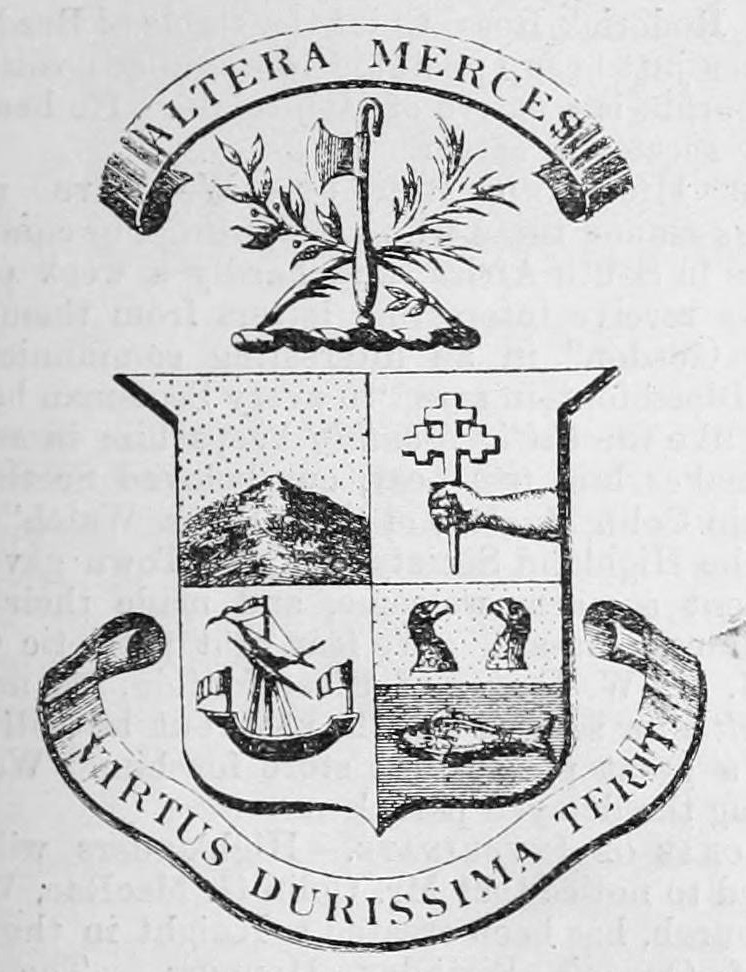
Arms of Maclean of Coll

MacLean
of Coll

== See also ==
- Maclean baronets
- Notable Macleans
- Ardgour
- Duart Castle
- Irish nobility

== Notes and references ==
- Way of Plean, George; Squire, Romilly (2000). Clans & Tartans. Glasgow: HarperCollins. ISBN 0-00-472501-8.
- Innes of Learney, Thomas (1971). The Tartans of the Clans and Families of Scotland (8th Edition (1975 reprint) ed.). Edinburgh: Johnston and Bacon Publishers. ISBN 0717945014. OCLC 286413.
