= Duart Castle =

Castle in Scotland

Coordinates: 56°27′21.9″N 5°39′17.8″W

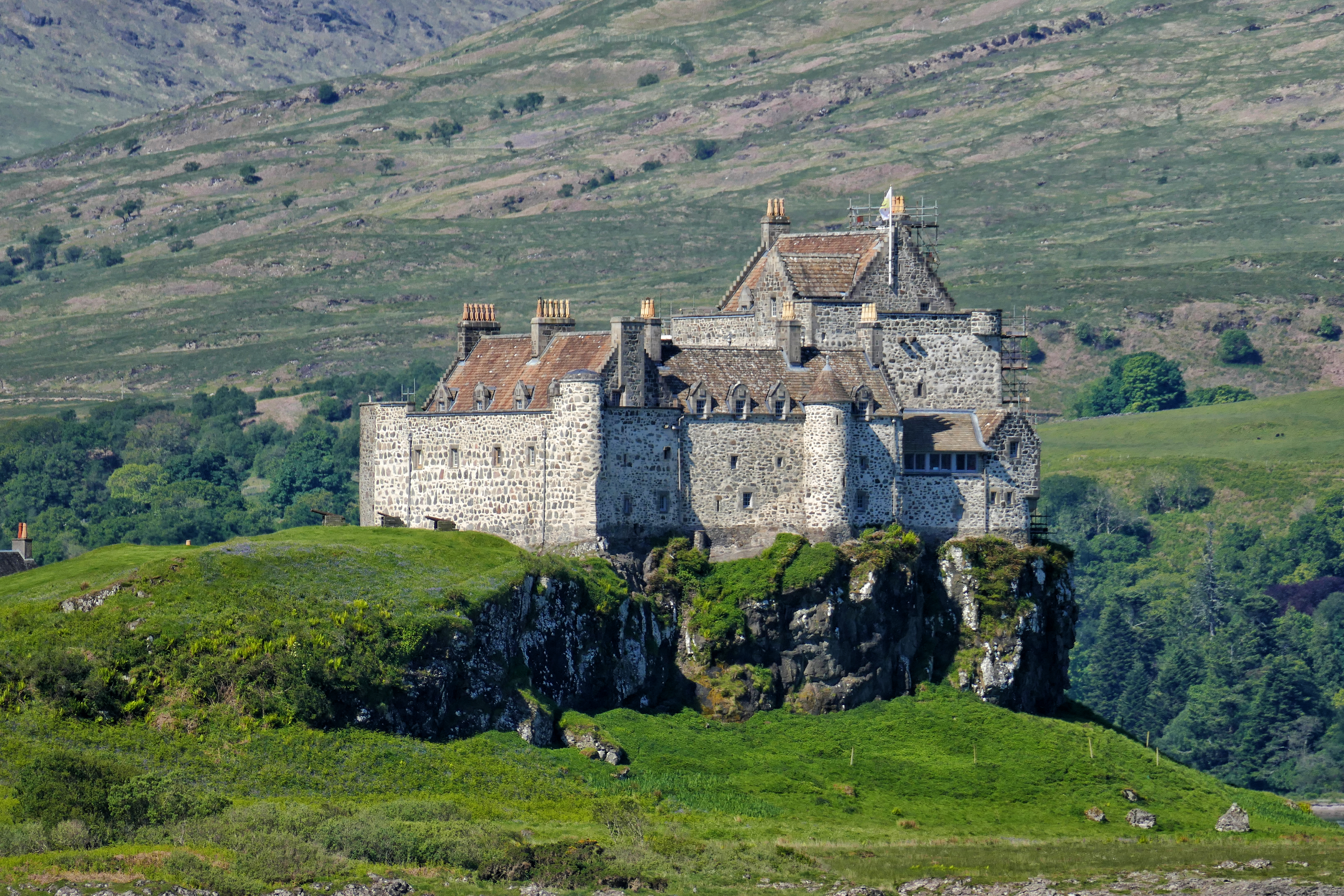
- The castle in 2022

- Location within Mull
- Location: Isle of Mull, Scotland, PA64 6AP
- Type: Castle
- Website: https://duartcastle.com

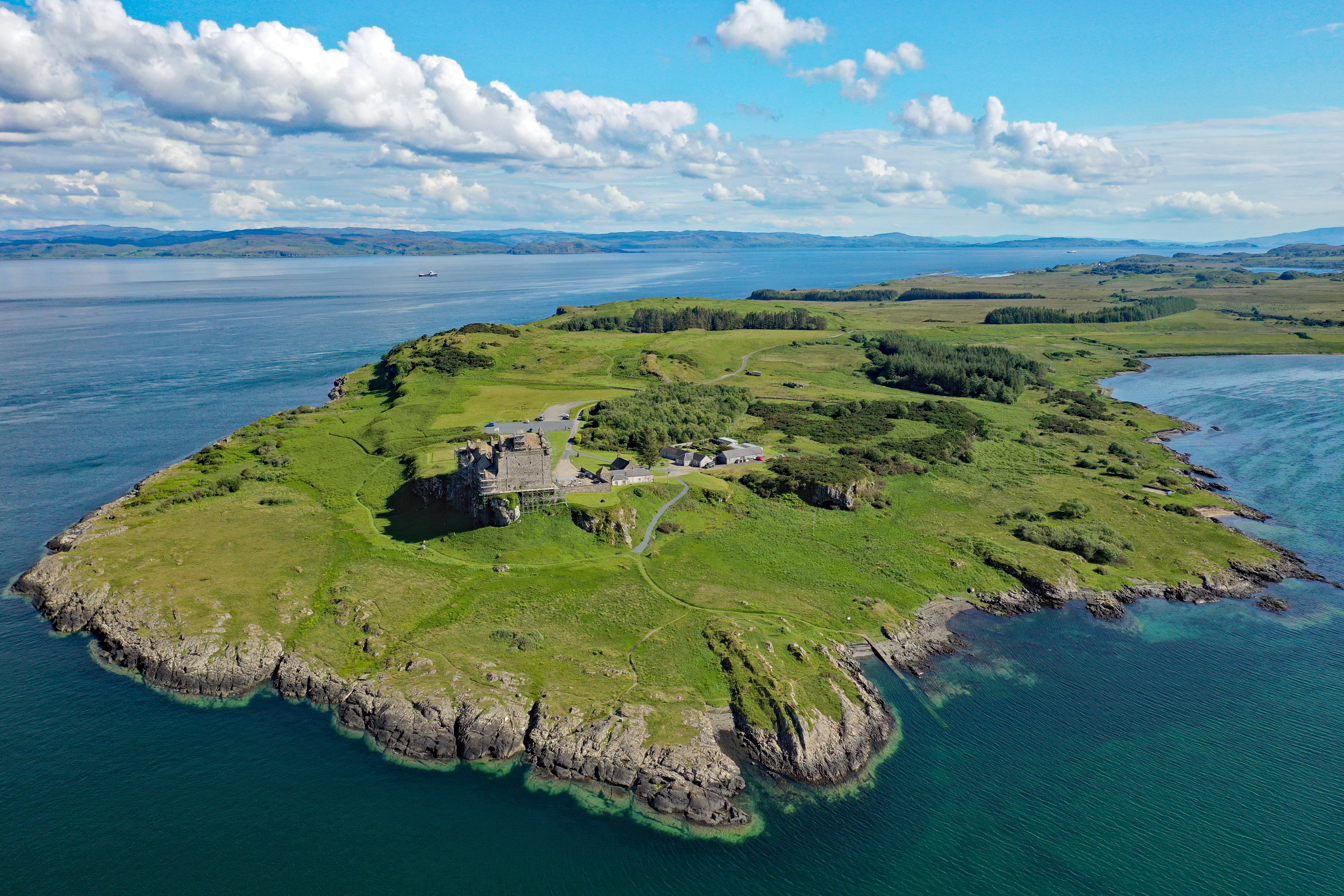
Aerial of Duart Castle, Isle of Mull

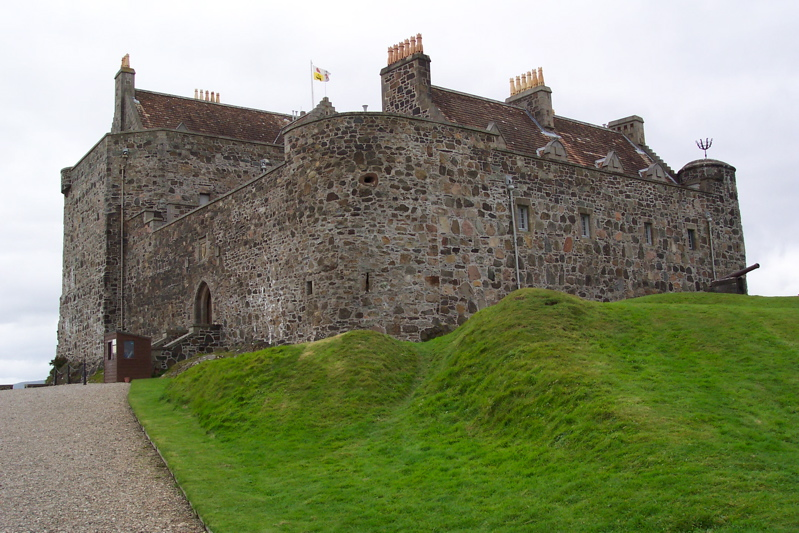
Duart Castle

Duart Castle, or Caisteal Dhubhairt in Scottish Gaelic, is a castle on the Isle of Mull, beside the Sound of Mull off the west coast of Scotland, within the council area of Argyll and Bute. The castle dates back to the 13th century and is the seat of Clan MacLean. One source states that the castle was "brought back from ruin in 1911". The regimental colours of the WW1 Canadian Expeditionary Force 236th Battalion (New Brunswick Kilties), CEF are laid up in the Great Hall.

== History ==
Duart Castle was probably built by Clan MacDougall in the 13th century, and appears to have come into the hands of Clan MacLean in the following century.

In 1350, Lachlan Lubanach Maclean of Duart, the 5th Clan Chief, married Mary Macdonald, daughter of John of Islay, Lord of the Isles, and Duart was part of her dowry. John of Islay's son, Donald Macdonald, Lord of the Isles, confirmed the castle by charter to the Macleans in 1390.

In 1647, Duart Castle was attacked and laid siege to by the Argyll government troops of Clan Campbell, but they were defeated and driven off by the Royalist troops of Clan MacLean.

In September 1653, a Cromwellian task force of six ships anchored off the castle, but the Macleans had already fled to Tiree. A storm blew up on the 13 September and three ships were lost, including Swan. To the north of the castle is a Historic Marine Protected Area within which lie the remains of a wrecked 17th century warship, believed to be the Swan.

In 1678, the 9th Earl of Argyll, Chief of Clan Campbell and son of the late Marquess of Argyll, successfully invaded the Clan MacLean lands on the Isle of Mull and Sir John Maclean, 4th Baronet, fled the castle and withdrew to Cairnbulg Castle, and afterward to Kintail under the protection of the 3rd Earl of Seaforth.

In 1691, Duart Castle was surrendered by Sir John Maclean, 4th Baronet, to the 10th Earl of Argyll (who was later created, in 1701, the 1st Duke of Argyll). The Campbell clan partially demolished the castle, and the stones from the walls were scattered. The 5th Laird of Torloisk used some of the stones to build a cottage for his family close to the site of the castle.

By 1751, the remains of the castle were abandoned.

Descendants of the 1st Duke of Argyll sold the castle in 1801, to MacQuarrie, who then sold it to Carter-Campbell of Possil who kept it as a ruin within the grounds of his own estate to the north, Torosay Castle. He later sold his Torosay Estate, which now included the ruins of Castle Duart, to A. C. Guthrie in 1865. On 11 September 1911, the ruin was separated from the rest of the Torosay Estate and was bought by Sir Fitzroy Donald Maclean, the 26th Chief of the Clan MacLean, and restored.

By 2012, additional restorations were required and a fund was set up to accept donations for this purpose. Phase 7 of the project was underway in 2020.

== Lairds of Duart ==
Lairds are owners of an estate.

- Lachlan Lubanach Maclean, 5th Chief, 1st laird of Duart, it was part of his wife's dowry.
- Red Hector of the Battles Maclean, 6th Chief, 2nd laird of Duart.
- Lachlan Bronneach Maclean, 7th Chief, 3rd laird of Duart.
- Lachlan Og Maclean, 8th Chief, 4th laird of Duart.
- Hector Odhar Maclean, 9th Chief, 5th laird of Duart.
- Lachlan Maclean, 10th Chief, 6th laird of Duart.
- Lachlan Cattanach Maclean, 11th Chief, 7th laird of Duart.
- Hector Mor Maclean, 12th Chief (1497–1568), 8th laird of Duart.
- Hector Og Maclean, 13th Chief, 9th laird of Duart.
- Lachlan Mor Maclean, 14th Chief, 10th laird of Duart.
- Sir Hector Og Maclean, 15th Chief, 11th laird of Duart.

...

- Sir John Maclean, 4th Baronet, 16th Laird of Duart. He surrendered Duart Castle in 1691 to The 10th Earl of Argyll, who demolished the castle. Sir John Maclean became the last laird of Duart until the restoration of the castle by Sir Fitzroy Donald Maclean over 221 years later.

== 2014 restoration ==
In 2012, the centenary of the 1912 restoration, the Chief of Clan Maclean announced that his family could no longer afford the upkeep of the castle in light of the expense of major repairs. In the winter of 2013–14 the castle lost four ceilings, which were brought down by water penetration through the chimneys. In July 2014, a restoration appeal was launched.

== Film location ==
The castle was used as a location in the 1945 film I Know Where I'm Going! (as "Castle of Sorne"). It was also featured in the 1971 film When Eight Bells Toll, starring Anthony Hopkins and in the 1999 film Entrapment, starring Sean Connery (who has MacLean ancestry on his mother's side) and Catherine Zeta-Jones.

It is also the setting for the base of Buffy Summers in the first half of Buffy the Vampire Slayer Season Eight.

== Lighthouse ==
To the south east of the castle is the Duart Point lighthouse. The lighthouse was built in 1900, as a memorial to Scottish novelist William Black.
