= Timeline of the Thirteen Colonies =

This is a timeline of the Thirteen Colonies, tracing the European exploration and settlement of eastern North America from the late 16th century through the American Revolution and the recognition of American independence in 1783. It covers the founding of English colonies including Virginia, Massachusetts, and Pennsylvania, alongside competing Spanish, French, and Dutch colonial ventures, conflicts with Native American nations, and the political developments that led to the Thirteen Colonies' break from British rule and the American Revolutionary War.

== 1553–1603 - Reigns of Mary I of England (1553-1558) and Elizabeth I of England ==
- 1560–1603 – "Elizabethan Sea Dogs" (privateers), state-sanctioned attacks and plunder of Spanish ships
- 1570 – Spanish attempt to found the Ajacán Mission in Virginia
- 1585 – The Roanoke Colony is founded. English.
- 1587 – Virginia Dare born; first English child born in North America.
- 1588 – Thomas Harriot publishes A Briefe and True Report of the New Found Land of Virginia, an account of his voyage to Roanoke; contains an early account of the Native American population encountered by the expedition; it proved very influential upon later English explorers and colonists.
- 1590 – John White discovers Roanoke abandoned.
- 1595 – Spanish attempt to found the Nuestra Señora de Guadalupe de Tolomato in Georgia.

== 1603-1625 - Reign of James VI and I ==
- 1603 – Martin Pring maps Cape Cod and Massachusetts.
- 1605 – George Weymouth explores New England.
- 1606 – The London Company and the Plymouth Company are granted charters by the crown.
- 1607 – Founding of the Jamestown, Virginia, first permanent English overseas colony. Attempted colony at Sagadahoc fails. The Tarratine Wars between Penobscot and Tarrantines begin.
- 1609–10 – The Starving Time at Jamestown.
- 1609 – Henry Hudson explores the Hudson River, establishes Dutch claim to New Netherland. The Virginia Company wrecks on and settles Bermuda.
- 1609-1646 Anglo-Powhatan Wars between Indigenous peoples of Virginia and English settlers appropriating their territory
- 1611–1616 – Thomas Dale and Thomas Gates serve as Governor of Virginia.
- 1613 – Shirley Plantation is founded. Oldest continually operated farm in the United States. Deputy Governor of Virginia Samuel Argall raids Saint-Saveur in Port-Royal (Acadia), now Maine.
- 1614 – Peace between the Virginia colony and the Powhatan Confederacy. The Virginia Company spins off control of Bermuda to the Somers Island Company.
- 1616 – The Great Dying was an epidemic that destroyed many eastern New England native Americans.
- 1619 – First meeting of the Virginia House of Burgesses. First enslaved Africans in Virginia. End of the Great Dying epidemic
- 1620 – The Council for New England founded. The Pilgrims found the Plymouth Colony.
- 1622 – Indian massacre of 1622 in Virginia. Short lived Weymouth Colony established and disestablished.
- 1623 – David Thompson builds a fish processing station at Pannaway Plantation. Dorchester Company founded.
- 1624 – Virginia Company collapses and Virginia becomes a crown colony. Dutch West India Company founds New Netherland.
- 1624–1626 – Massachusetts Bay Colony founded.
- 1624–1628 – Mohawks defeat the Mahicans.

== 1625-1649 - reign of Charles I of England ==
- 1626 – Founding of Salem, Massachusetts (originally called "Naumkeag").
- 1626 – Peter Minuit purchases Manhattan.
- 1628 – Dorchester Company reorganized as the New England Company.
- 1629 – New England Company reorganized as the Massachusetts Bay Company. John Mason and Sir Ferdinando Gorges agree to split their land claims into New Hampshire and Maine.
- 1629 – Kiliaen van Rensselaer institutes the patroon system in New Netherland.
- 1630 – Puritans found Boston and ten other settlements in the Massachusetts Bay Colony. John Winthrop preaches his City upon a Hill sermon. First meeting of the Massachusetts General Court.
- 1632 - George Calvert, 1st Baron Baltimore obtains charter to found the Province of Maryland.
- 1634 – Creation of the shires of Virginia. Council members insist on viewing the Massachusetts charter. Board of Trade established.
- 1634 - First English settlers arrive in Maryland.
- 1634–1636 – First English settlements in the Connecticut River Valley.
- 1635 – Roger Williams expelled from the Massachusetts Bay Colony.
- 1635 - First meeting of the Maryland General Assembly.
- 1635 - Saybrook Colony founded.
- 1636 – Connecticut Colony founded.
- 1636 - Roger Williams founds the Colony of Rhode Island and Providence Plantations.
- 1636 - Harvard University founded, oldest English university in America.
- 1637 – The Pequot War results in the killing of many of the Pequot people.
- 1637 - New Haven Colony is founded.
- 1637 - Anne Hutchinson expelled from the Massachusetts Bay Colony.
- 1638 – Founding of New Sweden. First mention of slavery in the laws of the Province of Maryland.
- 1639 – Crown formally recognizes the Virginia Assembly. Fundamental Orders of Connecticut adopted.
- 1641 – First meeting of representatives in New Netherland. Four New Hampshire towns vote to join Massachusetts. Massachusetts Body of Liberties adopted by General Court.
- 1643 – The New England Confederation is founded.
- 1643–1645 – Kieft's War between the Native Americans and the Dutch settlers.
- 1644 – Parliament grants charter to the Colony of Rhode Island and Providence Plantations. Saybrook Colony incorporated into the Connecticut Colony.
- 1644–1646 – Second Native American Massacre. The Plundering Time in Maryland.
- 1646 – Peter Stuyvesant becomes Director-General of New Netherland.
- 1647 – Witch trials in Connecticut begin.
- 1648 – The Cambridge Platform.
- 1649 – Death of John Winthrop.

== 1649-1660 - English Commonwealth ==
- 1650 - Virginia targeted by Parliament for supporting the Royalist cause.
- 1651 – First Navigation Act issued. Virginia acknowledges the authority of the Parliament of England rather than the monarchy.
- 1652 – Massachusetts Bay Colony authorizes John Hull and Robert Sanderson to issue colonial coinage. Maine incorporated into Massachusetts.
- 1653 – Virginia settlers moving south create the first habitations in North Carolina known as the Albemarle Settlements.
- 1654 – New England Confederation invades Acadia.
- 1655 – Dutch conquer New Sweden. The Peach Tree War between Dutch settlers and the Susquehannock and allied tribes. Maryland fights the Battle of the Severn.
- 1656 – First Quakers arrive in New England.
- 1657 – Jews allowed to become burghers of New Amsterdam. Flushing Remonstrance lays groundwork for religious freedom in America.

== 1660-1685 - Reign of Charles II of England ==
- 1660 – William Berkeley restored as governor of Virginia as part of the Stuart Restoration. Office of the Secretary of State for the Southern Department established.
- 1660 - First of the Navigation Acts enumerates exports from the colonies. Execution of Mary Dyer.
- 1662 – Crown confirms the charters of Rhode Island and Connecticut. New Haven Colony incorporated into the Connecticut Colony. Half-Way Covenant in New England. In the Colony of Virginia, the House of Burgesses passes a law declaring that, with respect to slavery, children take the status of their mother.
- 1663 – Second Navigation Act regulates exports to the colonies. Crown grants proprietary charter creating the Province of Carolina.
- 1664 – Royal Commission of 1664 investigates conditions in New England. As part of the Second Anglo-Dutch War, England captures New Netherland and renames it the Province of New York.
- 1665 – The Duke's Laws are issued. Royal commission establishes royally controlled Province of Maine. Same commission establishes directly administered King's Province.
- 1668 – Massachusetts Bay Colony reasserts control over Province of Maine
- 1669 – The Fundamental Constitutions of Carolina are drawn up. Revolt of the Long Swede in Delaware.
- 1670 – Charleston, South Carolina is founded, originally as Charles Town.
- 1672–1674 – Third Anglo-Dutch War.
- 1673 – Third Navigation Act regulates intercolonial trade. Virginia land rights given to Thomas Colepeper, 2nd Baron Colepeper and Henry Bennet, 1st Earl of Arlington. Dutch raid on North America results in the recapture of New York City.
- 1674 – East Jersey and West Jersey chartered. Treaty of Westminster confirms British ownership of the Province of New York.
- 1675 – Lords of Trade and Plantations established to aid management and governance of the colonies.
- 1675-1678 – King Philip's War between Native Americans and English settlers; Northfield, Massachusetts abandoned.
- 1676 – Bacon's Rebellion quashed. Metacomet defeated; war continues in Maine as First Abenaki War. William Penn and the Quakers purchase West Jersey.
- 1677 – Colonists in North Carolina rebel against Thomas Colepeper, 2nd Baron Colepeper. Edmund Andros, Governor of New York, negotiates the Covenant Chain with the Iroquois.
- 1680 – Destruction of the Westo people in South Carolina. Charleston, South Carolina relocated to its current location. Province of New Hampshire becomes a royal colony.
- 1681 – William Penn granted charter to establish Province of Pennsylvania. Edward Randolph appointed customs collector for New England. City of London loses its charter.
- 1682 – Philadelphia founded. Plant cutter riots in Gloucester County, Virginia. Edward Cranfield first royally appointed and imposed governor in New England.
- 1683 – "Hull Mint" closed. John Hull dies. Gove's Rebellion occurs for 1 day in Province of New Hampshire
- 1683 – Province of New York holds first assembly and issues the Charter of Liberties. Institution of quo warranto proceedings against the Province of Massachusetts.

== 1685-1689 - Reign of James II of England ==
- 1685 – Articles of misdemeanor drawn up against provinces of Rhode Island and Connecticut. Creation of the Dominion of New England.
- 1686 – Edmund Andros becomes Governor General of the Dominion of New England. First German Pietists arrive in Pennsylvania.
- 1687 – New England protests against arbitrary taxes. Reverend John Wise jailed.
- 1688 – Province of New York added to the Dominion of New England.

== 1689-1694 - Reign of William III and Mary II ==
- 1689 – April: Dominion of New England overthrown in Boston. June: Leisler's Rebellion. July: Proprietary government overthrown in Maryland in the Protestant Revolution. Beginning of King William's War in the colonies. George Keith controversy divides Pennsylvania Quakers.
- 1690 – Schenectady, New York devastated by French and Native American troops. Massachusetts Bay Colony becomes first colony to issue paper money.
- 1691 – The Province of Carolina passes a law for the better ordering of slaves. Massachusetts Bay Colony, Plymouth Colony, and Nova Scotia combine to form Province of Massachusetts Bay. Edward Randolph appointed Surveyor General of North American Customs.
- 1692 – First of the Salem witch trials.
- 1693 – The College of William & Mary founded in Williamsburg. Rice culture introduced in the Province of Carolina.

== 1694-1702 - Reign of William III of England (as sole monarch) ==
- 1696 – The Royal Navy receives the first warship built in the colonies, the HMS Falkland.
- 1697 – Treaty of Ryswick signed, ending King William's War.
- 1699 – Parliament bans export of colonial woolens. Free blacks ordered to leave the Colony of Virginia. Mary Allerton, last surviving passenger on the Mayflower, dies.
- 1700 – William Kidd arrested in Boston.
- 1701 – William Penn issues his last frame of government. Delaware Colony granted charter, separating it from Pennsylvania. Yale College founded. New York – New Jersey Line War begins and lasts 60 years.
- 1702 – East Jersey and West Jersey merge, becoming the Province of New Jersey. Beginning of the War of the Spanish Succession in Europe / Queen Anne's War in the colonies. Province of Carolina attacks St. Augustine.

== 1702-1714 - Reign of Anne, Queen of Great Britain ==
- 1702 – Province of South Carolina governor James Moore Sr. attempts unsuccessful siege of St. Augustine. East Jersey and West Jersey are consolidated into the Province of New Jersey.
- 1703 – France and her Wabanaki allies commence the Northeast Coast Campaign which is the first campaign of Queen Anne's War in New England.
- 1704 – Raid on Deerfield. The Province of Carolina allows the arming of slaves during time of war.
- 1705 – The House of Burgesses passes the Virginia Slave Codes of 1705.
- 1706 – Benjamin Franklin born, oldest US founding father. Charleston, South Carolina successfully defended.
- 1707 – New England provincial militia attempt an unsuccessful siege of Port Royal.
- 1710 – Francis Nicholson leads regular and New England provincial troops in the Siege of Port Royal. They successfully conquer Acadia for the last time.
- 1711 – Cary's Rebellion occurs in the beginning of the year in Province of North Carolina. Broad Arrow Policy extended to all of New England, New York, and New Jersey.
- 1711–12 – North Carolina begins the Tuscarora War in fighting with the Tuscarora people.
- 1712 – New York Slave Revolt of 1712.
- 1713 – Treaty of Utrecht ends Queen Anne's War. Treaty of Portsmouth ends Queen Anne's War with the Wabanaki.

== 1714-1727 - Reign of George I of Great Britain ==
- 1715 – South Carolina begins the Yamasee War against the Yamasee people.
- 1716 – Virginia governor Alexander Spotswood organizes the Knights of the Golden Horseshoe Expedition to explore west of the Blue Ridge Mountains.
- 1718 – Blackbeard killed by naval forces of the Colony of Virginia in the Battle of Ocracoke. Stede Bonnet captured after the Battle of Cape Fear River. Catholics barred from voting in Maryland.
- 1719 – Rebellion against proprietary officials in South Carolina; Carolina converted to a crown colony.
- 1720 – Slaves become the majority of the population in South Carolina.
- 1721 – 1721 Boston smallpox outbreak leads to first public inoculation drive.
- 1722 – Beginning of Dummer's War
- 1723 – Colony of Virginia passes an act to deal with slave conspiracies.
- 1725 – The Battle of Norridgewock ends Dummer's War and the Wabanaki threat to New England.
- 1727 – The Log College founded in Pennsylvania. First evangelical Presbyterian serminary in North America. Hollis Chair founded at Harvard becoming the oldest science professorship in the United States.

== 1727-1760 - Reign of George II of Great Britain ==
- 1729 – Proprietary rights to South and North Carolina are surrendered. The disputed King's Province is joined to Rhode Island.
- 1730 – For the first time, the majority of slaves in Chesapeake, Virginia were born in the New World. Cresap's War begins between the Province of Pennsylvania and Maryland.
- 1732 – The Province of South Carolina attempts to ban the import of slaves. The Province of Georgia is founded.
- 1733 – The Molasses Act passed. Replaced by Sugar Act in 1764.
- 1735 – The Province of Georgia bans slavery.
- 1736 – Bellevue Hospital founded in New York City.
- 1739 – Outbreak of the War of Jenkins' Ear. The Stono Rebellion in the Province of South Carolina is crushed.
- 1740 – The Plantation Act is passed to encourage immigration to the colonies and regularize colonial naturalization procedures. Beginning of the War of Austrian Succession in Europe. Battle of Cartagena de Indias, where the colonists are called "Americans" for the first time. James Oglethorpe fails to take St. Augustine. South Carolina enacts the Negro Act of 1740.
- 1741 – The New York Conspiracy of 1741 is suppressed. Jonathan Edwards preaches "Sinners in the Hands of an Angry God", a key moment of the First Great Awakening.
- 1742 – Philadelphia Election Riot caused by tensions between Quakers, Anglicans, and Germans. Spain attempts to invade Georgia.
- 1744 – The French Raid on Canso brings the War of Austrian Succession of North America where it is known as King George's War.
- 1745 – New Englanders take Louisbourg.
- 1746 – Princeton University founded, with Jonathan Dickinson as its first president.
- 1747 – Founding of the Ohio Company. Knowles Riot in Boston.
- 1748 – Treaty of Aix-la-Chapelle (1748) ends War of Austrian Succession.
- 1749 – Governor Benning Wentworth issues deeds in the New Hampshire Grants causing violence with the Province of New York.
- 1750 – Thomas Walker passes through the Cumberland Gap. Reversing itself, the Province of Georgia decides to permit slavery.
- 1751 – Pennsylvania Hospital founded. George Washington visits Barbados; only trip he takes outside the United States.
- 1752 – Philadelphia Contributionship founded by Benjamin Franklin. Oldest insurance company in the United States.
- 1754 – Outbreak of French and Indian War. French build Fort Duquesne. Albany Congress, where plans of colonial union are unveiled. Columbia University founded as King's College by George II Royal Charter.
- 1755 – Braddock Expedition. University of Pennsylvania founded.
- 1756 – French and Indian War spreads to Europe where it is called the Seven Years' War. Royal American Regiment raised as one of the oldest active (as opposed to provincial) British Army units recruited in the colonies.
- 1757 – Siege of Fort William Henry.
- 1758 – Battle of Fort Duquesne. The first black Baptist church is founded in Lunenburg, Virginia. James Monroe, the youngest Founding Father, is born.
- 1759 – Royal Naval Dockyard, Halifax beats Boston and New York City to be selected as home of the Royal Navy and the North America station.
- 1760 – Battle of the Thousand Islands, after which Jeffery Amherst receives the surrender of New France.

== 1760-1783 - Reign and occupation of George III of Great Britain in the Thirteen Colonies ==
- 1761 – February: Writs of Assistance challenged in Massachusetts. December: Ban on colonial land grants.
- 1763 – February: Treaty of Paris ends the French and Indian War. April: Beginning of Pontiac's War. October: Proclamation of 1763 December: Conestoga Native Americans killed by the Paxton Boys. Mississippi Land Company founded by prominent Virginians.
- 1764 – April: The Parliament of Great Britain passes the Sugar Act and the Currency Act; Brown University founded as College in the English Colony of Rhode Island and Providence Plantations. The Hartford Courant is founded.
- 1765 – March: Stamp Act is passed. May: Quartering Act is passed. Virginia House of Burgesses passes the Virginia Resolves. August: Riots in Boston. October: Stamp Act Congress held in New York City. November: The Stamp Act due to come into effect.
- 1766 – January: The New York Assembly refuses to implement the Quartering Act. March: The Declaratory Act is passed, repealing the Stamp Act. End of Pontiac's War. The Regulator Movement in North Carolina begins.
- 1767 – March: Boston makes first attempt at a nonimportation agreement. June: Townshend Acts passed. November: Publication of Letters from a Farmer in Pennsylvania begins. Mason–Dixon line completed which ended Cresap's War.
- 1768 – February: Massachusetts sends circular letter to the other colonial assemblies. March: Second nonimportation agreement is reached. June: Bostonians riot when HMS Romney seizes the Liberty. September: A convention of Massachusetts towns is held. Office of the Secretary of State for the Colonies established to help manage North American colonies.
- 1769 – February: Parliament passes resolve calling for harsher treatment of the American colonists. December: Dartmouth College founded by King George III Royal Charter. Royal commission settles the New York – New Jersey Line War. Pennamite–Yankee Wars erupts between Connecticut and Pennsylvania.
- 1770 – March: The Boston Massacre. April: The Townshend duties are repealed on all goods except tea. Government approves a proposal for the colony of Vandalia. Equestrian statue of King George III dedicated in Bowling Green, Manhattan.
- 1771 – Battle of Alamance ends the Regulator Movement in North Carolina.
- 1772 – June: Gaspée Affair. October: Committee of correspondence established in Boston. Settlers outside the Proclamation of 1763 boundary sign the Watauga Association.
- 1773 – January: Charleston Museum founded, oldest museum in the US. March: Virginia Intercolonial committee of correspondence established. May: Tea Act passed. December: The Boston Tea Party. Royal mint creates coins for Virginia.
- 1774 – March: Boston Port Act passed. May: Massachusetts Government Act passed. June: Quartering Act passed. September–October: First Continental Congress meets in Philadelphia. Lord Dunmore's War begins between Virginia and natives in Ohio.
- 1775 – Early: Wealthy North Carolineans found the Transylvania Company. March: "Give me liberty or give me death!" speech. March–April: Parliament passes the Restraining Acts. April: Battles of Lexington and Concord. May: Second Continental Congress meets in Philadelphia. August: Proclamation of Rebellion.
- 1776 – January: Publication of Common Sense. April: American ports opened to all nations. May: Continental Congress authorizes the drafting of new state constitutions. July 2: The Lee Resolution is approved, officially separating the United Colonies from the British Empire. July 4: Adoption of the United States Declaration of Independence.
- 1776–1783 – American Revolution.
- 1777 – Establishment of the Vermont Republic
- 1783 – September: Britain signs the Treaty of Paris, recognizing American independence. November 25: The British evacuate New York, marking the end of British rule, and General George Washington triumphantly returns with the Continental Army. Expulsion of the Loyalists occurred with many moving to Canada or Great Britain.

== See also ==
- Timeline of the American Revolution
- Timeline of Canadian history
