= David Thompson (New Hampshire settler) =

Early settler of New England

- Born: 1588; Corstorphine, Kingdom of Scotland
- Disappeared: 1628 (age 39–40); Boston, Massachusetts Bay Colony
- Other name: David Thomson
- Education: University of Edinburgh
- Known for: Founder of New Hampshire, namesake of Thompson Island
- Spouse: Amias Cole (m. 1613)
- Children: 4

David Thompson or David Thomson (c. 1588 – disappeared 1628) was an early Scot settler of the New England area, considered the founder and first non-native settler of New Hampshire. He was granted a land patent for Thompson Island in Boston Harbor, which continues to bear his name. According to Burke's Landed Gentry (2010), his family—the Thomsons of Corstorphine—are direct descendants of a great-grandson of King Robert II of Scotland, namely, Sir Thomas Stewart, Master of Mar.

== Early life and ancestry ==
David Thompson or Thomson was born in Corstorphine, a village in the Kingdom of Scotland. His father was the Reverend Richard Thomson, who had received an ecclesiastical appointment from James VI of Scotland (reigned 1567–1625). The identity of David's mother is unknown. His stepmother (Richard Thomson's second wife) was Agnes Foulis.

Richard Thomson was the son of Bernard Thomson and Agnes Balzert. His paternal grandparents were Alexander Thomson and Janet Gourlay, daughter of Baron William Gourlay, 9th of Kincraig. His great-grandparents were Alexander Thomson and Margaret Forrester. This Alexander died in combat during the Battle of Flodden (1513). Margaret was reportedly a great-granddaughter of John Forrester of Corstorphine, who had served as Lord High Chamberlain of Scotland.

Alexander Thomson was thought to be a son or grandson of Thomas Stewart, Master of Mar. The name Thomson is a Scottish patronymic surname, and means "son of Thomas". Thomas Stewart was a son of Alexander Stewart, Earl of Mar, grandson to Alexander Stewart, Earl of Buchan, and great-grandson of Robert II of Scotland and Elizabeth Mure.

Thomson's stepmother Agnes Foulis' niece was married to Thomas Hamilton, the Secretary of State of Scotland. Agnes' nephew, David Foulis, Baron Ingleby, was King James' ambassador to England's Queen Elizabeth I. Following the Queen's death in 1603, Foulis served as the cofferer to Prince Henry Stuart. And David's father, Magister Rev. Richard Thomson, was well known to King James and worked in coordination with the monarch to reign in certain ministers that challenged the King's authority.

David Thompson was first mentioned in 1602, when he received a bursary to attend the University of Edinburgh to study philosophy. David was named heir to his father in 1607 during a "Retour", return to Chancery, "an inquest that took place in the court of the sheriffdom of Edinburgh held in the town-house of the same burgh in the presence of Mr. William Stewart Sheriff."

In 1606, at age 14, Thomson was sent by his mother's employer, Ferdinando Gorges to Maine as part of an attempt to establish Popham Colony. By 1608, the attempt at colonization was aborted.

After returning to Plymouth England, Thomson married Amias Cole, the daughter of shipwright William Cole on July 13, 1613. They had four children, Ann, Judith, Priscilla, and John. Thompson returned to New England briefly in 1616. He returned again to England the following year. While back England, Thompson came to know Squanto, and Thompson sailed with Captain Thomas Dermer and Squanto to back to New England in 1619. Thompson helped rescue a stranded Native American boy on the Isle of Shoals during his 1619 trip, and the boy was given to Thompson as a servant by the local sachem. When Thompson returned again to Plymouth, England, in 1620, he found himself advising the religious refugees bound for New England (the Pilgrims (Plymouth Colony)). A few months after the departure of the Mayflower and Speedwell (1577 ship), Thompson also crossed the Atlantic again and stayed at Pannaway Plantation until 1622. Thomson was again in London in 1622, but in spring of 1623, with his whole family, he returned again to America never to come back.

== Background of founding the New Hampshire colony ==
The colony that became the state of New Hampshire was founded on a 6,000-acre (2,400 ha) land grant given in 1622 by the Council for New England to Mr. David Thomson, gent. David Thompson first settled at Odiorne's Point in Rye (near Portsmouth) with a group of craftsmen and fishermen from England in 1623, just three years after the Pilgrims landed at Plymouth. The settlers built a fort, manor house, and other buildings, some for fish processing, on Flake Hill at the mouth of the Piscataqua River, naming the settlement Pannaway Plantation. In 1623, the English explorer Christopher Levett, an associate of Gorges and a member of the Council for New England, wrote of visiting Thompson at his Pannaway Plantation. In the summer of 1623, Thomson provided much needed food to the Pilgrims at Plymouth, Massachusetts.

Early historians used to believe the first native-born New Hampshirite, John Thompson, was born there; later he was found to have been baptized at St. Andrew's Parish in Plymouth, England, in 1619.

A second son, Miles, was likely born on Thompson Island in 1627.

== Disappearance after moving to Boston ==
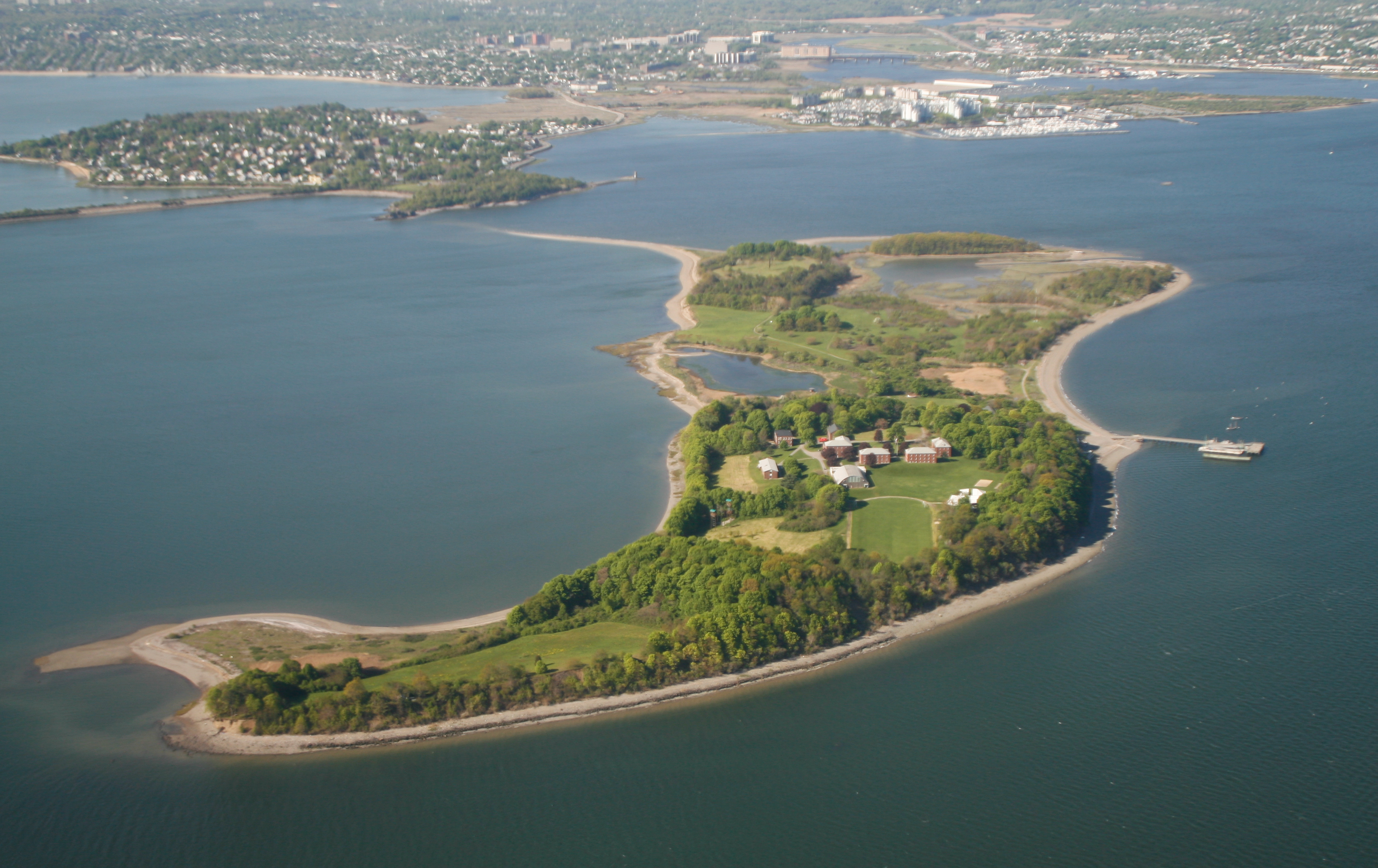
Thompson Island, Boston Harbor, 2008

David Thompson's grant for 6,000 acres (2,400 ha) was divided into two parts. According to an Indenture signed in Plymouth, England, Thomson received three-quarters of the plantation and one-quarter was held by three former mayors of Plymouth, Abraham Colmer, Nicholas Sherwill, and Leonard Pomery. Thomson was to send out seven men with him on the ship, the Jonathan of Plymouth, and the former lord-mayors who were also merchants, "will this present year, at their charge, provide and send three men more, in the ship Providence, of Plymouth, if they may be so soon gotten, or in some other ship, with the first expedition that may be, to New England; the charges of these three men to be borne equally by all the parties." The Hiltons, Edward, and William may have settled on a portion of the allotment to the three mayors. Thompson moved his family to an island in Boston Harbor (today called Thompson Island in his honor) in 1626, and he may have had a fur trading post on the island before moving there. The Thompsons became some of the first European settlers of Boston, Massachusetts.

David Thompson disappeared in 1628 and was never heard from again. Some historians theorize he was the victim of foul play. Others suggest that he accidentally drowned in Boston Harbor. Thompson's widow, Amias (1596–1672), remarried to Samuel Maverick of Noddle's Island. Thomson's son, John, later successfully recovered ownership of the island from the town of Dorchester, before another party acquired it. John Thomson was among the first settlers in Mendon, Massachusetts. His brother, Miles, settled in Berwick, Maine.

In 1629, following Thomson's death, Captain John Mason (former governor of Newfoundland) and Sir Ferdinando Gorges (who founded Maine) granted the territory to themselves. The colony was named "New Hampshire" by Mason after the English county of Hampshire, one of the first Saxon shires. Though historians have assumed that David Thomson was acting on the behest of Gorges and Mason, he acted independently of them but rather served as an agent to the council and at times, acted as its attorney.

== See also ==
- List of people who disappeared mysteriously (pre-1910)
- New Hampshire Historical Marker No. 78: Odiorne's Point
