= Pannaway Plantation =

- Plantation
- Territory: English America
- Province: Massachusetts Bay Colony
- Settled: 1622
- Abandoned: 1630
- Time zone: UTC-5 (Eastern)
  - Summer (DST): Eastern

Pannaway Plantation was the first European settlement in what is now currently the state of New Hampshire. By 1630, the plantation was abandoned, and the settlers moved to Strawbery Banke in what is now Portsmouth. Pannaway Plantation was settled on land that is now in Odiorne Point State Park in the town of Rye.

== History ==
Pannaway is an Abenaki word likely to mean "place where the water spreads out". When John Mason was granted a colony to start in British America, he was granted the land from the Merrimack River up to where the Piscataqua River flows into the Atlantic Ocean (the current border of Maine and New Hampshire), an area just slightly larger than the modern coastal boundaries of New Hampshire. Ferdinando Gorges claimed the land north of the Piscataqua river, in what is now Maine. The first settler to go into Pannaway Plantation was David Thompson. He had his family come to the plantation. He was granted 6,000 acres (24 km^{2}) of land in the New World when he arrived. Ten other men went with him to settle the land. Thompson gave the name "Pannaway" to the plantation after hearing it from an Indian who guided him. In his first year here, he was greeted by Captain Myles Standish of the Plymouth Colony who was looking for aid at the time.

Christopher Levett in his 1623 Voyage to New England states that he spent a month here. In July 1623, Thomas Weston of the Weymouth Colony was shipwrecked off today's North Hampton, a few miles south of Pannaway. He was tortured by the Natives, who stripped him of his clothing, and he ran away barely escaping death. He ended up making it to Pannaway to shelter.

In 1626, Thompson left the settlement and for an island (now known as Thompson Island) in Boston Harbor. Thompson disappeared in 1628, and his wife later remarried to Samuel Maverick, one of the first slave traders in the colony. By 1630, Strawbery Banke was proven to be more secure of a location from the Indians, and the settler Walter Neale invited them to come in. Pannaway Plantation was later abandoned. Today, the location of the plantation is in Odiorne Point State Park.

== See also ==
- New Hampshire Historical Marker No. 78: Odiorne's Point
