= Mairead inghean Eachainn =

Scottish royal consort

Mairead inghean Eachainn, also known as Mairead nic Eachainn, was a consort of Alexander Stewart, Earl of Buchan (a man also known as the "Wolf of Badenoch"). She was the daughter of a man named Eachann, and probably the mother of several children, including Alexander's like-named son, Alexander Stewart, Earl of Mar.

== Mairead and Alexander ==
Mairead was the daughter of a man named Eachann. She is described by a papal letter as "a woman of the diocese of Ross". Although she was evidently a Gaelic-speaking Highlander, the identity and location of her family are otherwise unknown. (Note: The Moray Register gives the name of Mairead's father as "Achyn". An early nineteenth-century transcription of this source erroneously rendered the name "Athyn", influencing some later novelists and historians. One such historian was Angus Mackay, who theorised in the early twentieth century that "Athyn" referred to a Mackay chief, Iye Mackay. There is otherwise no evidence for this suggestion. The fact that a papal directive identifies Mairead as "Enyenachyn" (inghean Eachainn) further reveals that she was the daughter of a man named Eachann.)

Mairead is known to have cohabited with Alexander Stewart, Earl of Buchan in the late 1380s and 1390s. Although Alexander was canonically married to Euphemia I, Countess of Ross, his contemporaneous union with Mairead appears to have been a Gaelic secular marriage. Alexander's relationship with Mairead was not unprecedented. His father, Robert II, King of Scotland, had similarly cohabited with Elizabeth Mure. (Note: Robert and Elizabeth probably cohabited for over a decade before they received a papal dispensation in 1347, legitimised their children, and formalised their marriage in 1349. Alexander and Euphemia received a papal dispensation for their marriage in July 1382.)

Alexander and Euphemia were married in 1382. By way of their union, Alexander gained control of the lands of Ross, and attained a jointure of Euphemia's lands outside this earldom: Lewis, Skye, and Dingwall. Although he never gained the title Earl of Ross, Alexander was created Earl of Buchan by the king on account of Euphemia's inheritance. The childless marriage between Alexander and Euphemia was nevertheless a failure.

In 1389, Euphemia, brought a complaint before the bishops of Moray and Ross, declaring that her marriage was a sham because Alexander was cohabiting with Mairead. Alexander subsequently pledged to return to her as her husband, and promised not to use his men against her. There is reason to suspect that it was the prospect of losing his claim on Euphemia's territorial possessions that compelled Alexander to cave to Euphemia demands. (Note: The principal security to this contract was Robert, Earl of Sutherland, a man who was probably a son-in-law of Alexander and Mairead.)

In 1392, Antipope Clement VII finally terminated the marriage because it had been "the cause of wars, plundering, arson, murders, and many other damages and scandals". As a result of this divorce, Euphemia's lordships and estates were restored to her.

Alexander had five bastard sons. Mairead was evidently the mother of several of Alexander's children, including his like-named son. (Note: The birthdate of this son is uncertain. He may not have been Alexander's eldest son, although he is literally stated to have been in 1404. He was evidently at least fourteen in 1404, when he married Isabel Douglas, Countess of Mar.) If she was the mother of Alexander's sons Duncan and Robert—men who are otherwise recorded to have conducted raids in 1392—Alexander and Mairead must have been familiar with each other in the 1370s, at about the time Alexander first appears active in Badenoch. (Note: According to the fifteenth-century Scotichronicon, Duncan, described as Alexander's bastard, defeated the forces of Walter Ogilvy, Sheriff of Angus in 1392. The government outlawed twenty two of the combatants, the most prominent of whom were two Stewarts named Duncan and Robert. These men are likely identical to the sons of Alexander reported to have been imprisoned in Stirling Castle in 1399, and may have been amongst prisoners stated to have been held there between 1396 and 1402.)

Upon the conclusion of Alexander's marriage to Euphemia, Euphemia's son from an earlier marriage faced the prospect of losing his inheritance. The longstanding relationship between Mairead and Alexander, coupled with evidence of a sham marriage between him and Euphemia, could indicate that the latter union was a political maneuver orchestrated by Alexander's father. As such, this union could well have violated what was a preexisting marriage between Alexander and Mairead, the mother of his children.
