= Tomb of the Wolf of Badenoch =

Coordinates: 56°33′54″N 3°35′23″W

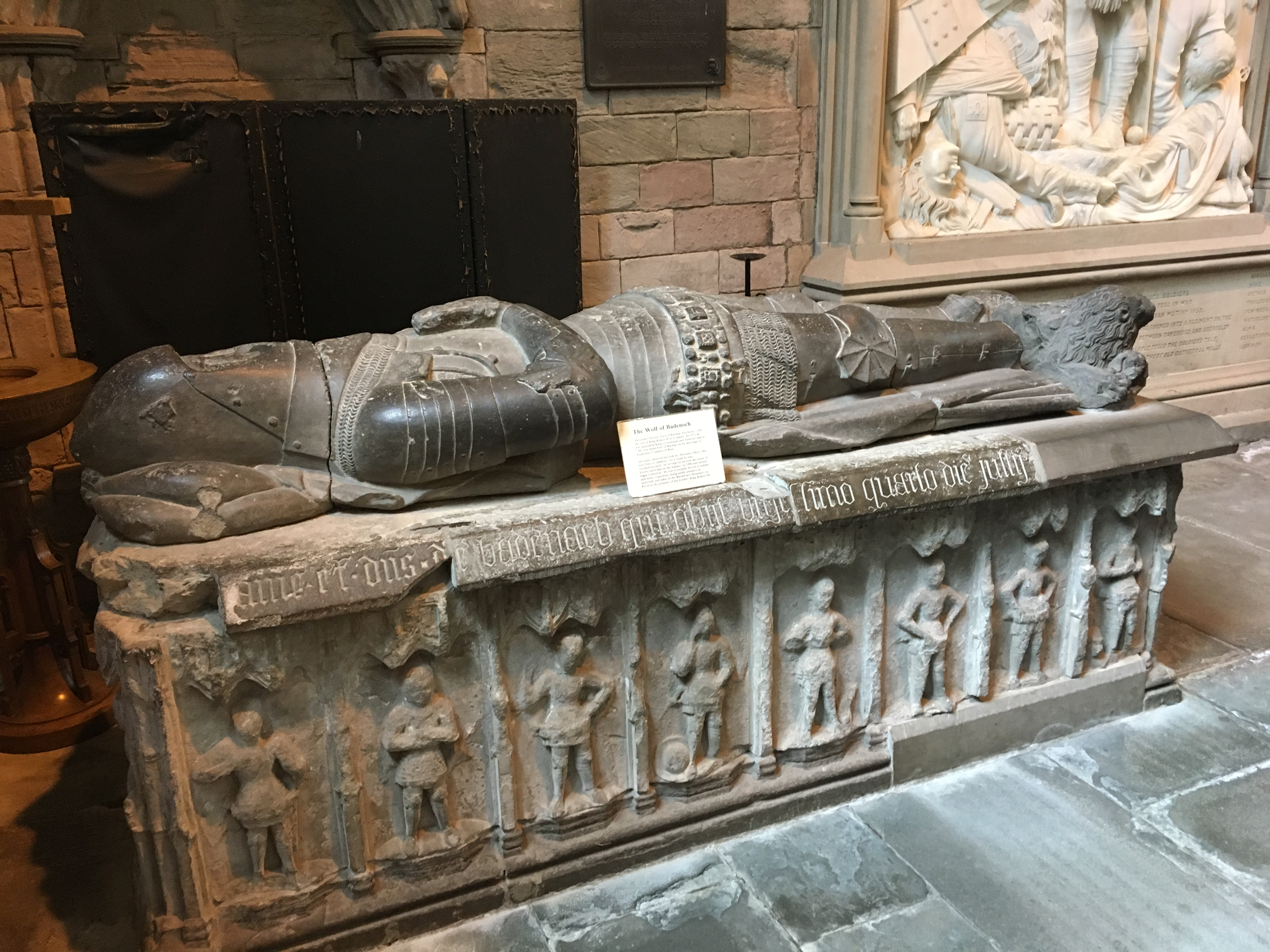
Tomb of Alexander Stewart, the Wolf of Badenoch. Dunkeld Cathedral, Perthshire, Scotland

The Tomb of the Wolf of Badenoch (or Tomb of Alexander Stewart) consists of a 15th-century tomb effigy and altar (or "chest") tomb, both of which are carved from marble. It is located in Dunkeld Cathedral, Perthshire, Scotland, and was built for Alexander Stewart, Earl of Buchan (1343 – c. 1394), who is buried underneath.

The effigy is placed on top of the altar tomb and shows Stewart in full and highly detailed knightly armour, with a lion (or dog) resting at his feet. It is in poor condition having been broken apart and defaced in the 16th century during the Scottish Reformation. The effigy is placed on top of an altar tomb lined with 22 pleurants (or "weepers"), who are also dressed in armour.

== Alexander Stewart, the Wolf of Badenoch ==
Stewart was the third surviving son of King Robert II of Scotland (1316 – 1390). He is known to history as the deeply unpopular "Wolf of Badenoch," a name given due to his notorious cruelty, in particular for his destruction of the royal burgh of Elgin and its 13th-century cathedral on June 17, 1390, for which he earned a reputation as "an enemy of the Church". He has also been described as "a species of Celtic Attila" and as "Scotland's vilest man".

There is a legend that Stewart died after a chess game with the Devil. According to this legend, he was visited at Ruthven Castle by a tall man dressed in black. The two played chess through the night, with a storm rising when the stranger called "Check" and "Check Mate". The legend says that the next morning the Wolf of Badenoch was found dead in the castle's hall, with his men dead outside the castle walls.

== Description ==
The tomb is inscribed with the year 1420.

The monument remains in its original position behind the choir screen at the east end of the cathedral, while Stewart's grave is underneath.

=== Effigy ===
The effigy is made from grey-green marble and measures 7 ft (2.1 m) in length. Stewart lies on a cloak and is dressed in full armour with his sword by his left side. His head is protected by a bascinet (an open-faced combat helmet) and visor and wears a pauldron—a type of spaulder covering the shoulders. He has a breastplate over his torso, above a plate skirt at his hips. He has a hip belt of a type worn in Scotland until the end of the 15th century. The animal resting at his feet may be a lion or (less likely) a dog.

The effigy is in poor condition, having been damaged c. 1560 during the Scottish Reformation. It now consists of four pieces broken apart at the neck, waist, knees and ankles. His right foot is missing and his face and left foot are severely damaged. However, it remains one of the best preserved pieces of royal medieval Scottish sculpture.

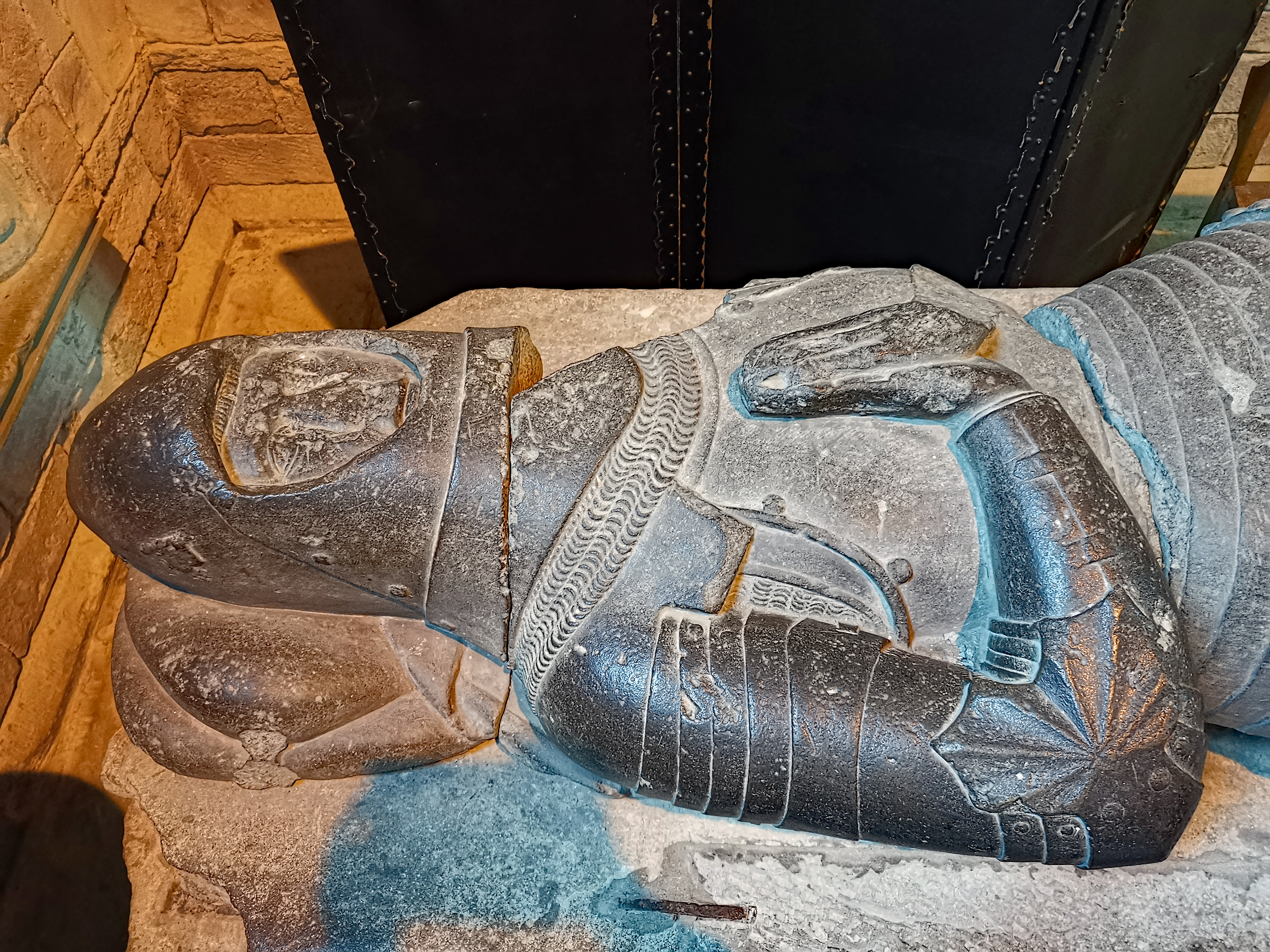
Detail of the head. Note the missing (damaged) facial features.

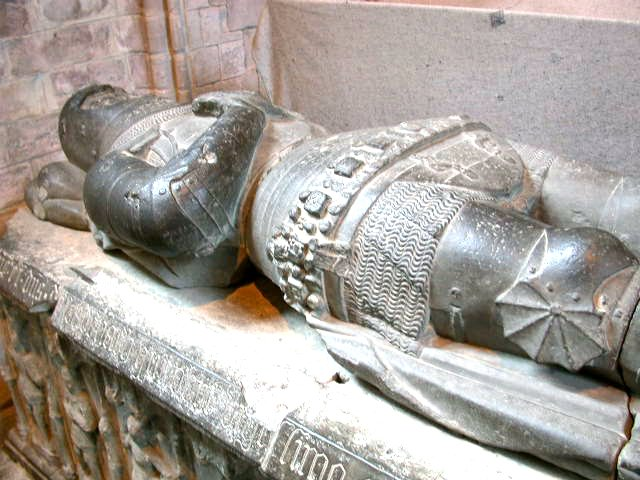
Detail of the armour with hip-belt

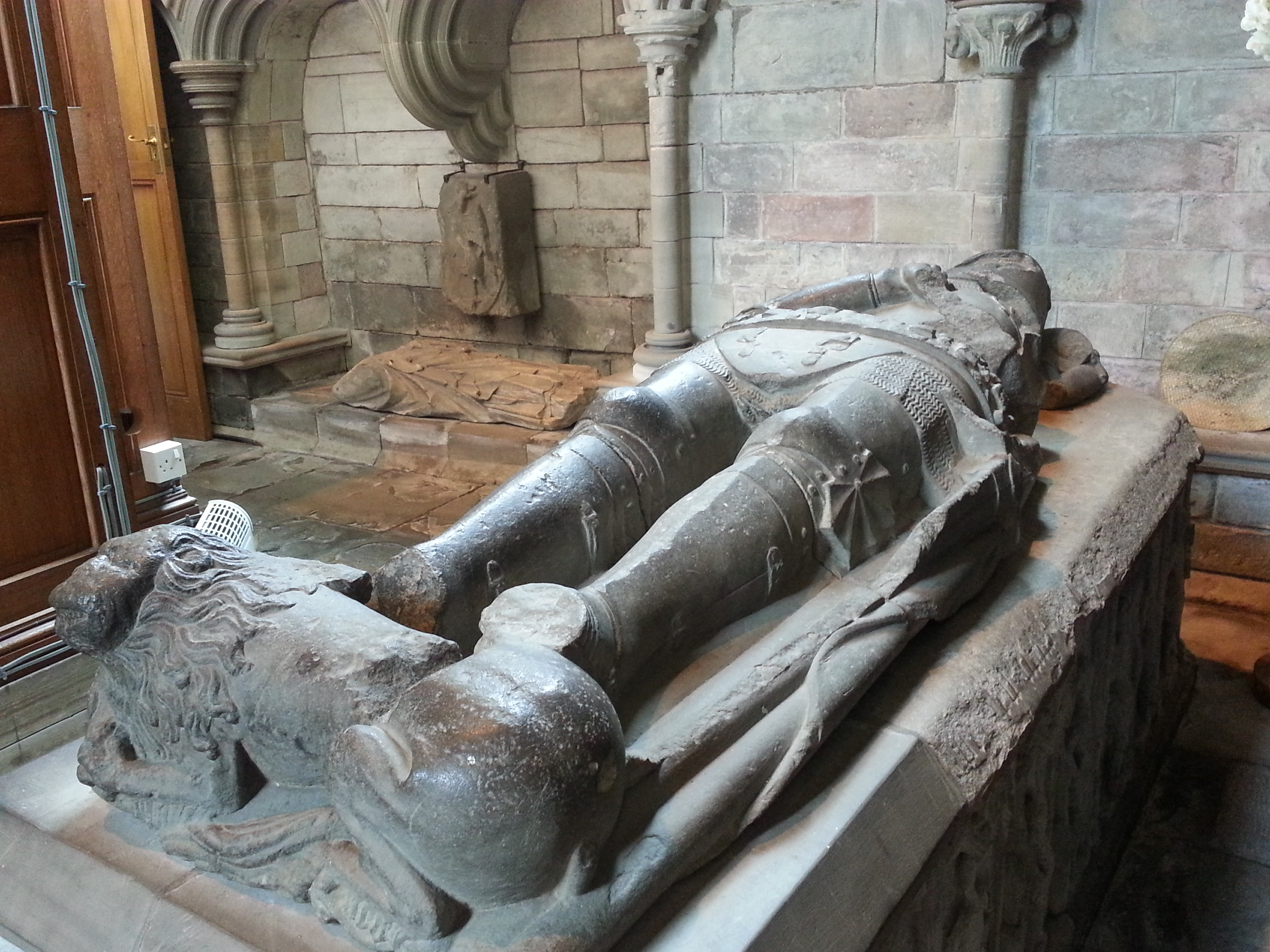
Detail with resting lion (?) in view

=== Altar tomb ===
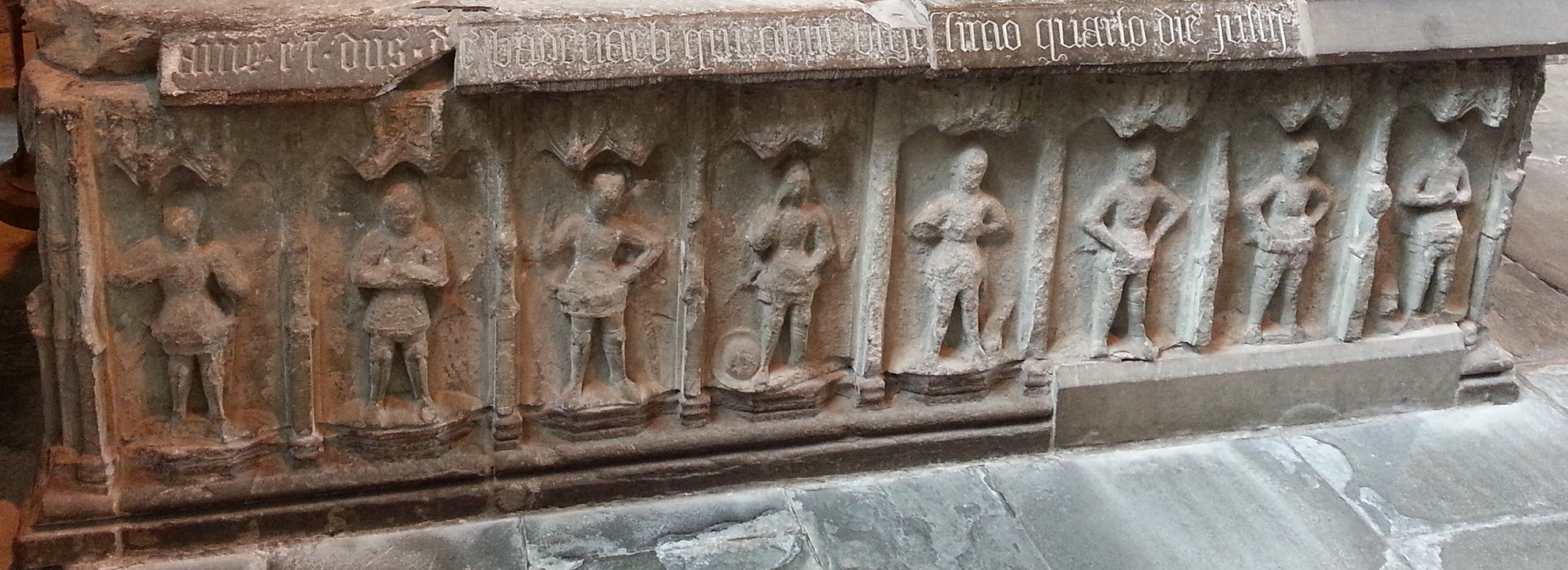
Detail of the inscription and weepers, right-hand view

The altar (or "chest") tomb contains 22 pleurants (or "weepers", that is, sculpted figures representing mourners) dressed in armour; eight on each long side and three at each end. These figures are positioned under three-arch canopies and separated by small buttresses.

The incomplete Latin inscription is placed on the edge of the stone slab below the effigy. It reads, "HIC JACET ALEXANDER SENESCALUS, FILIUS ROBERTI REGIS ET ELIZABETH MORE, DOMINUS DE BUCHAN ET DNS DE BADENACH QUI OBIIT VINGESIMO QUARTO DIE JULII [the end of the inscription is missing]". This translates as, "Here lies Alexander Stewart, son of King Robert and Elizabeth More [sic], Lord of Buchan and Lord of Badenach [sic], who died 24th of July [...]"

== Sources ==
- Boardman, Stephen I. The Early Stewart Kings: Robert II and Robert III, 1371–1406. Tuckwell Press Ltd, 1996. ISBN 978-1-898410-43-0.
- Norman, A.V. (1961). "The Effigy of Alexander Stewart, Earl of Buchan and Lord of Badenoch (?1343 - ?1405)". Proceedings of the Society of Antiquaries of Scotland. 92: 104–113. Archived from the original on 2025-09-09.
- Steer, Kenneth. Late Medieval Monumental Sculpture in the West Highlands. Edinburgh: Stationery Office Books, 1977. ISBN 978-0-1149-1383-0
- Stewart, Charles Poyntz. Historic memorials of the Stewarts of Forthergill Perthshire, and their male descendants. Edinburgh: W & A. K. Johnston, now in the National Library of Scotland, 1879.
