= Thomas Stewart, Master of Mar =

Sir Thomas Stewart, Master of Mar was an illegitimate son of Alexander Stewart, the earl of Mar. He was the great-grandson of King Robert II of Scotland. He died before August 1432.

Thomas married Elizabeth, the widow of John Stewart, 2nd Earl of Buchan, who was daughter of Archibald Douglas, 4th Earl of Douglas and Margaret Stewart, Lady of Galloway. They were required to obtain a marriage license, which was granted on 1 May 1427, due to their degrees of consanguinity and affinity.
