= Alexander Stewart, Earl of Buchan =

Alexander Stewart
- Earl of Buchan; Lord of Badenoch
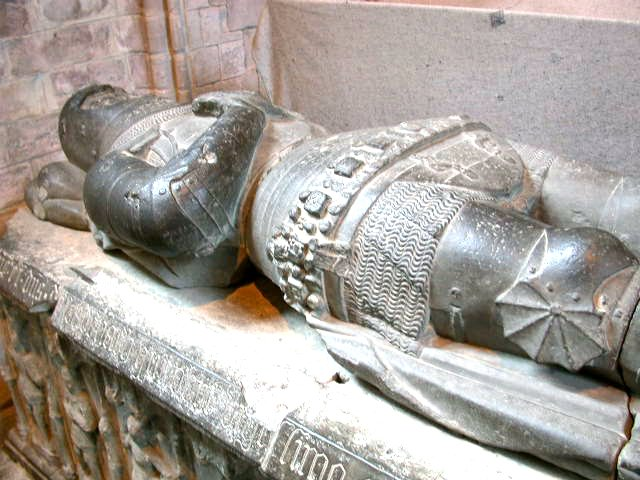
- Tomb of Alexander Stewart, Earl of Buchan at Dunkeld Cathedral, where he is buried.
- Reign: 1382–1394
- Born: c. 1343
- Died: 20 July 1405
- Spouse: Euphemia I, Countess of Ross
- Issue: Alexander Stewart, Earl of Mar
- House: Stewart
- Father: Robert II of Scotland
- Mother: Elizabeth Mure

Alexander Stewart, Earl of Buchan, called the Wolf of Badenoch (c. 1343 – 20 July 1405), was a Scottish royal prince, the fourth son of King Robert II of Scotland by his first wife Elizabeth Mure. He was Justiciar of Scotia and held large territories in the north of Scotland.

He is best remembered for his destruction of the royal burgh of Elgin and its cathedral. His sobriquet was given due to his notorious cruelty and rapacity, but there is no proof that it was used during his lifetime.

== Power and influence ==
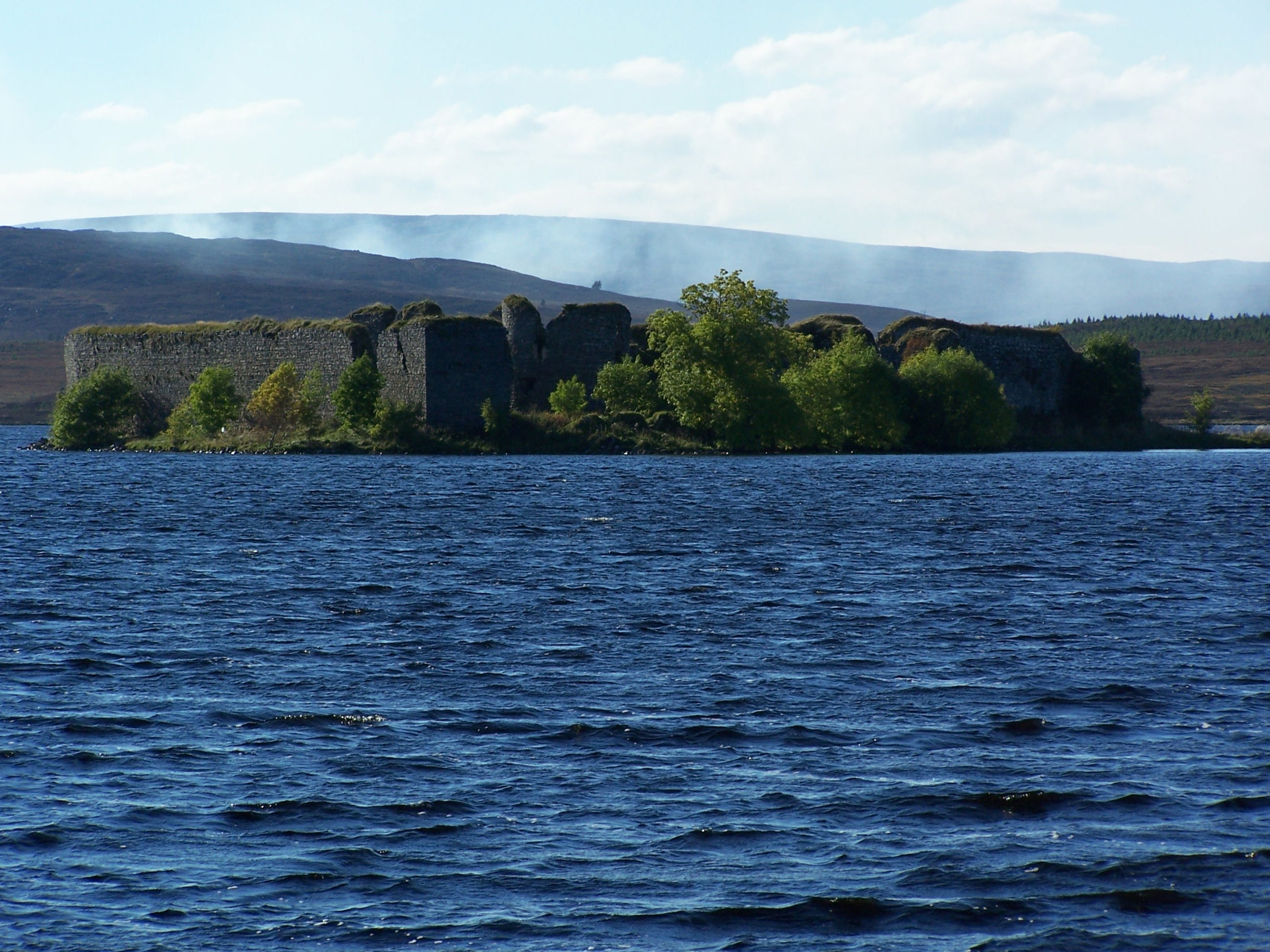
The "Wolf's Lair": Lochindorb Castle at Lochindorb in Badenoch, stronghold of Alexander.

Known in charters as Alexander Senescalli (Latin for Steward), first noted when, on 14 August 1370, he issued letters patent from Ruthven Castle undertaking to grant protection to the Bishop of Moray and all of his lands, men and property in Badenoch. His father, Robert the Steward, had acquired the lands of Badenoch probably from Euphemia, Countess of Moray, who had become his second wife.

Robert had a petulant relationship with his uncle, King David II of Scotland. In 1368, he and his sons were required by David's parliament to take an oath that they would keep their undisciplined followers in check—later that year, Robert and Alexander were imprisoned in Lochleven Castle possibly as a result of these oaths having been broken. Following Robert's accession to the throne, Alexander was formally made Lord of Badenoch on 30 March 1371.

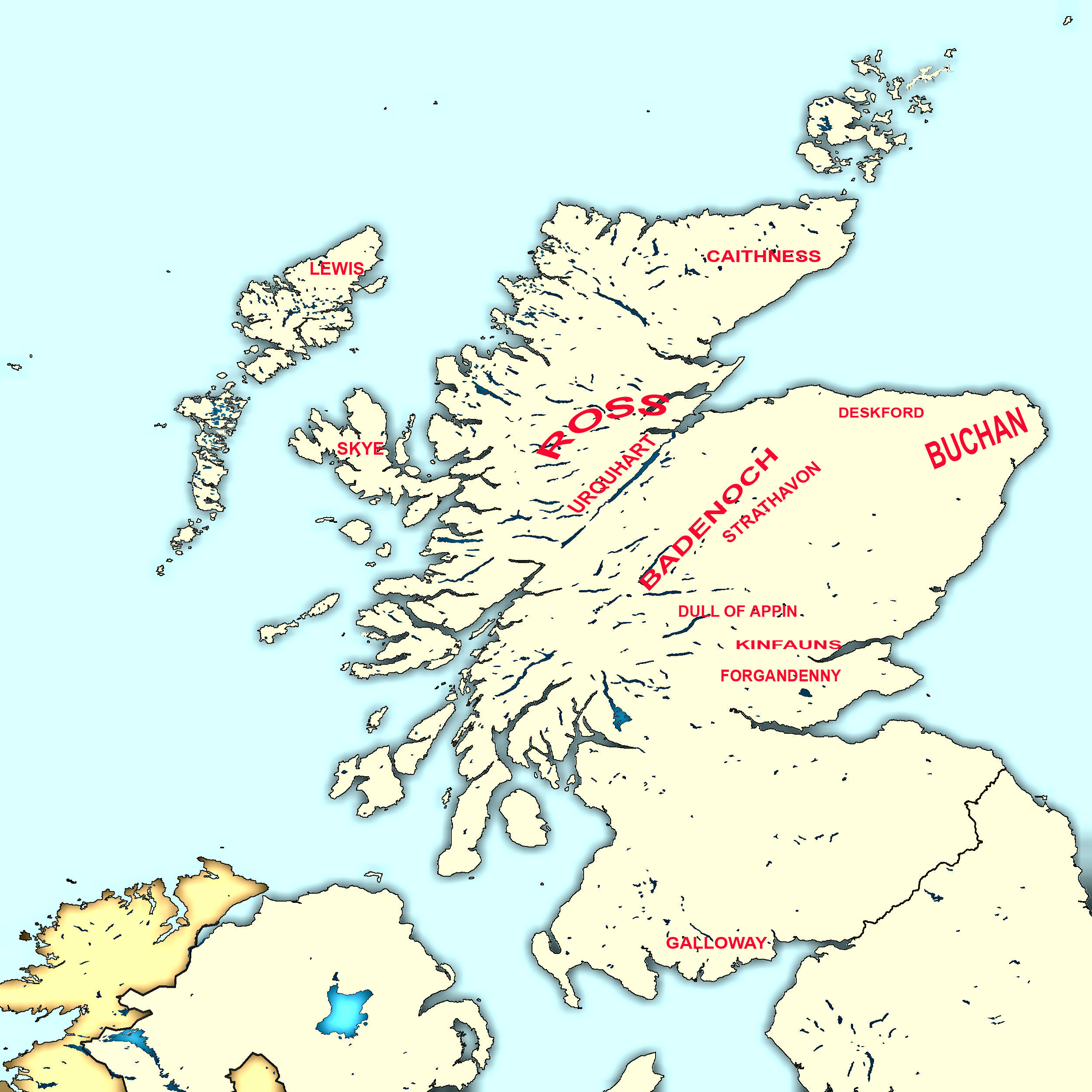
Lands held by Alexander Stewart, Earl of Buchan (based on map in Boardman, Early Stewart Kings, p. 87 & details in Young, Annals of the Parish and Burgh of Elgin, p. 102

Alexander's possession of Badenoch was unaffected by the restoration of the Earldom of Moray to John Dunbar in March 1372, nor were the territories of John MacDonald, Lord of the Isles, in Lochaber—similarly with the lands of Urquhart (south of Inverness) which had been granted to David Stewart, Earl of Strathearn and King Robert's eldest son with his second wife, Euphemia. Alexander further extended his territorial gains in 1371 by leasing the Urquhart lands from his younger half-brother and then obtained possession of the Barony of Strathavon bordering his Badenoch lands.

In October 1372, Alexander was given the Royal Lieutenancy for those lands outwith the Earldom of Moray north and west of Inverness and added lands in Aberdeenshire and north Perthshire. In the same year, he was Royal Justiciar in the Appin of Dull in Perthshire which meant that Alexander held crown authority from north Perthshire to the Pentland Firth.

Alexander de Ard, a principal claimant for the Earldom of Caithness as the eldest grandson of Earl Malise, resigned his territories to the crown in favour of both Alexander and his half-brother David. However Alexander effectively doubled his land holdings when he married Euphemia Countess of Ross, in June 1382.

Alexander became the jure uxoris Earl of Ross and this provided him the Ross lands (but only during his own lifetime). Other lands belonging to his wife – including Lewis, Skye, Dingwall and Kingedward in Aberdeenshire – he held in joint ownership with her. His possession of the Barony of Kingedward, a large part of the former Earldom of Buchan allowed King Robert to give Alexander the title of Earl of Buchan only days after his marriage. Alexander ruled these territories with the help of his own private cateran forces, building up resentment among other land owners and this included Alexander Bur, Bishop of Moray.

== Church defiance ==
There was no dominant potentate in Moray during the 12th and 13th centuries and the bishops ruled their territories with a great deal of independence, but this ended when King Robert I of Scotland elevated his nephew Thomas Randolph to the Earldom of Moray sometime between 12 April and 29 October 1312. The Randolph family did not hold the Earldom for long, and it reverted to the crown on the death of Thomas's son John, in 1346, and lay vacant for the next 26 years. In 1365, bishop Bur persuaded David II that his lands in Badenoch and Strathspey should be governed as if in regality. To emphasize this, Bur, when he entered into the protection agreement with Alexander in 1370, ensured that the de facto Lord of Badenoch would have no hold on him, nor his lands and people.

A few months later in March 1371, on his father's accession to the throne, Alexander was officially made Lord of Badenoch. Robert II's charter gave Alexander the lands of Badenoch seemingly in regality with, presumably, authority over the church lands. However, bishop Bur possibly protested at this, as the details of the grant of Badenoch contained in the Register of the Great Seal has no reference to regality.

Alexander was therefore to hold the Badenoch lands with no greater authority than John Comyn had a century before. The bishop continued to come under pressure from Alexander either directly or from his caterans possibly acting independently. Boardman explains that both the bishops of Moray and Aberdeen were in dispute with Alexander regarding the strain that his cateran followers were putting on church lands and tenants.

Boardman also theorises that it was this occupation of church lands, virtually rendering them worthless in terms of income, that may have been the reason for Bur 'voluntarily' giving up his rights to estates such as Rothiemurchas, on 20 April 1382. Complicating matters was that neither of the bishops could appeal to the 'legitimate secular authority' as that authority was Alexander himself in his positions of Lord of Badenoch and Royal Lieutenant and was the reason why they appealed directly to the King.

== Increasing pressure ==
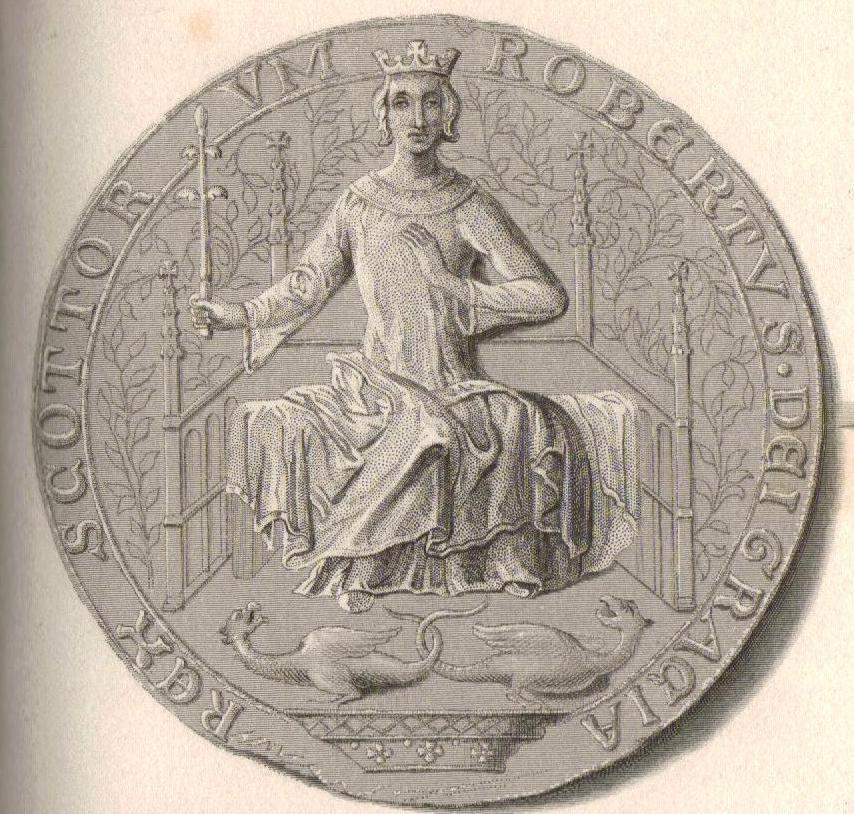
The seal of King Robert II of Scotland, reading ROBERTVS DEI GRACIA REX SCOTTORVM: Robert, by the grace of God, King of the Scots.

King Robert's reputation declined because of his backing Buchan's methods and so in November 1384, John, Earl of Carrick with the backing of the general council, took executive authority from his father with lawlessness in the north being a major issue. The Lordship of Strathnairn had been administered by Buchan with the approval of the King, but now under Carrick's leadership, Sir David Lindsay was able to reassert his right to Strathnairn.

In April 1385, at the council, Buchan's brother David claimed that Buchan was holding Urquhart unlawfully, while Sir James Lindsay of Crawford reinstated his claim to the Lordship of Buchan and finally, the Earl of Moray demanded that some of Buchan's men be prosecuted for the killing of some of his men. Despite these early attacks on his position, Buchan significantly strengthened his territorial position, especially in the Great Glen where he retained Urquhart after his brother's death and then in the autumn of 1386 he gained the lands of Bona at the head of Loch Ness from the Earl of Moray and the adjoining lands in Abriachin from Sir Robert Chisholm.

Buchan's increased influence in Scottish affairs was again furthered when sometime before February 1387, he was appointed Justiciar North of the Forth Carrick's guardianship of Scotland had not been a success and certainly failed to rein in Buchan and so late in 1388, King Robert's second son, Robert, Earl of Fife (Robert Stewart, Duke of Albany) became the effective ruler of the Kingdom.

Within days, Fife removed Buchan from the Justiciarship and, it is assumed, the Royal Lieutenancy and the Sheriffdom of Inverness and later installed his own son, Murdoch as Justiciar North of the Forth. Fife was very uncompromising towards Buchan, who had been described as 'useless to the community' at a previous general council meeting. Buchan had long deserted his wife and lived with Mairead inghean Eachainn with whom he had several children, including Alexander Stewart, Earl of Mar. Marital law was the prerogative of the Church and so on 2 November 1389, Bishop Alexander Bur of Moray and Bishop Alexander Kylquhous of Ross, ordered his return to his wife, Euphemia. Buchan agreed to this but didn't live up to his promise and so Fife encouraged Euphemia of Ross during her divorce proceedings against Buchan and, in 1392, Euphemia was successful in her appeal to the Avignon papal court and his marriage was annulled. Following the annulment, Buchan lost all claim to Euphemia's lands which returned to her and to her son Alexander Leslie, Earl of Ross who contracted to marry Fife's daughter.

== Burning of Elgin and aftermath ==
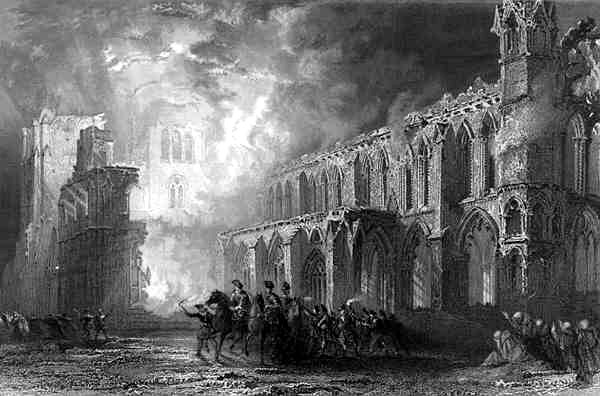
19th-century depiction of the burning of Elgin Cathedral

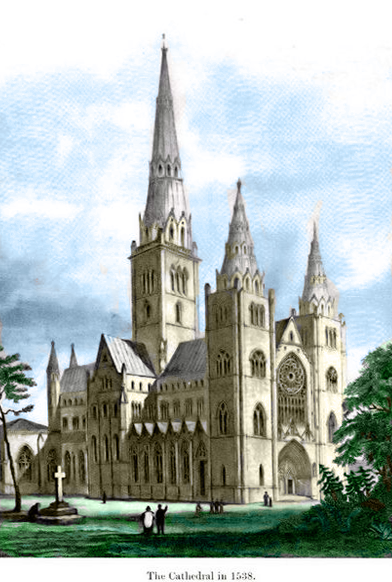
The reconstructed cathedral after the burning

King Robert II died at Dundonald Castle in Ayrshire on 19 April 1390 and the chronicler Wyntoun informs that Robert was not buried at Scone until 13 August 1390, only a day before his son John, Earl of Carrick was crowned King as Robert III. Fife was retained as Guardian of Scotland probably much against Buchan's hopes as he must have looked at some sort of volte-face on some of Fife's actions, particularly as Buchan reached his zenith of possessions under Carrick. On top of this, Bishop Bur turned to Thomas Dunbar, Sheriff of Inverness and son of the Earl of Moray to provide his protection. The events of May and June 1390 in the Laich of Moray were perhaps the result of a combination of factors that presented themselves to Buchan. Firstly, John Dunbar, Earl of Moray and his fellow northern landowner Sir David Lindsay of Glenesk both absented themselves from Moray to attend a substantial tourney at Richard II of England's court. In addition, Bishop Bur's involvement with Buchan's estrangement with his wife and then Bur's alignment with Moray presented an opportunity for revenge culminating in the destruction of Forres in May and then Elgin with its cathedral in June. His destruction of the church possessions in Elgin was complete—as well as the cathedral, the monastery of the Greyfriars, St Giles parish church and the Hospital of Maison Dieu were all put to flame. Church and state now came together to oppose him—excommunicated by Bur, Buchan had to appear at the Church of the Friars Preacher, in Perth in the presence of his brothers, King Robert III of Scotland and the Earl of Fife, and the council-general to plead for forgiveness—absolution was granted by bishop Walter Trail, Bishop of St Andrews.

Buchan's brutal assault on Moray in 1390 was to some extent intended to extricate himself from Fife's domination but turned out to be unsuccessful—Alexander was to lose his Lordship of Urquhart in 1392 and then his claim on Ross following his wife's divorce in 1392. Fife's influence waned during the mid-1390s while that of King Robert and his son David, Earl of Carrick increased—the King took back responsibility for Scottish-English relations and had manoeuvred the Red Douglas Earl of Angus into a dominating position in southeastern Scotland at the expense of Fife's ally, the Black Douglas. Although Fife's authority over Scottish affairs had lessened he still exercised considerable power in government. Fife and Carrick both campaigned against Buchan and his sons and other lawless elements in the west and north. Although Buchan appeared to have halted his violent traits after this, his sons did not. A fight ensued near Pitlochry involving Duncan and Robert Stewart at the head of a band of caterans when Sir Walter Ogilvie and Walter de Lychton and followers were killed. Later it is recorded that three sons of Buchan were imprisoned in Stirling Castle from 1396 to 1402, perhaps the reason for Buchan's low profile during the later 1390s.

Buchan is again mentioned at Spynie Castle on 3 May 1398 being ordered to deliver it up to William, bishop of Moray by Robert III. Buchan appears to have left the north in his latter years appearing as Baillie of the Earldom of Atholl in 1402 and a mention in 1404 in Perth. However, several sources indicate he died in July 1394, which causes one to wonder to whom is being referred in 1398 and 1404 if not his son by the same name.

Buchan having acquired vast territories in the north lost a large part of them during his own lifetime (lands of Ross and Urquhart). He held royal appointments only to have them removed (Justiciar of Scotia and Royal Lieutenant north of the Moray Firth.) He was unsuccessful in maintaining law and order and this seen alongside his inability to hold onto his Ross territories demonstrated his ineffectiveness.

== Death ==
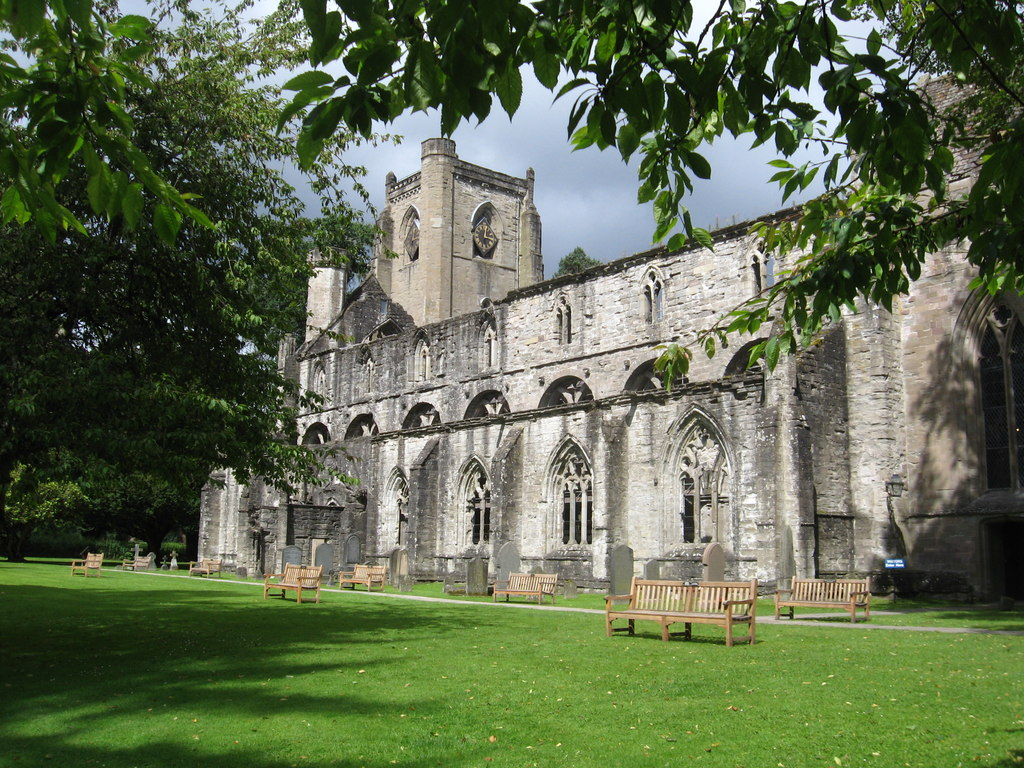
Dunkeld Cathedral, Alexander Stewart's burial place

Stewart died circa 20 July 1405 and was buried at Dunkeld Cathedral, Perthshire. His chest tomb, topped by an effigy in armour, is one of the few Scottish royal monuments to have survived from the Middle Ages. The partly restored Latin inscription reads: "HIC JACET ALEXANDER SENESCALUS, FILIUS ROBERTI REGIS ET ELIZABETH MORE, DOMINUS DE BUCHAN ET DNS DE BADENACH QUI OBIIT VINGESIMO QUARTO DIE JULII [the final part of the inscription is missing]".

There is a legend that Stewart died after a chess game with the Devil. According to this legend, he was visited at Ruthven Castle by a tall man dressed in black. The two played chess through the night, with a storm rising when the stranger called "Check" and "Check Mate". The legend says that the next morning the Wolf of Badenoch was found dead in the castle's hall, with his men dead outside the castle walls.

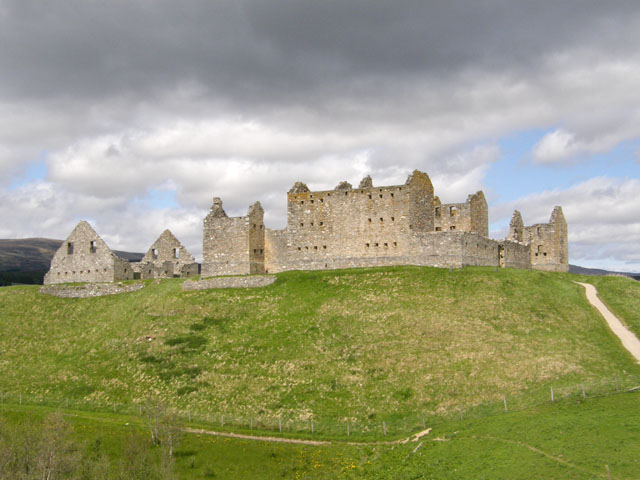
Ruthven Barracks, on the site of the castle where, according to legend, Stewart died

== Mairead inghean Eachann ==
Historian Angus Mackay claims that Stewart's mistress, Mairead inghean Eachainn, was, in fact, Mariota Mackay, daughter of Iye Mackay, 4th of Strathnaver. There is, however, no evidence for this assertion. Stewart and Mairead had several illegitimate children, including Alexander Stewart, Earl of Mar.

Mackay says that Mariota Mackay, who is described in Latin as "Mariota filia Athyn", being the "handfasted" wife of Alexander Stewart, would explain Stewart's friendship with Farquhar Mackay, who was Mariota Mackay's brother and physician to Robert II of Scotland. It would also explain why a party of Mackay's supported Stewart in a raid into the Braes of Angus in 1391. It may well also have served as a motive for Angus Du Mackay, 7th of Strathnaver having supported Alexander Stewart, the Earl of Mar, son of the Wolf, at the Battle of Dingwall in 1411 against Donald of Islay, Lord of the Isles, as Mackay and Stewart the Earl of Mar would have been cousins.

== See also ==
- Scottish monarchs family tree

== Notes ==
Peerage of Scotland
Preceded by Vacant; Last preceded by John Comyn	Earl of Buchan; 1382–1405	Succeeded by John Stewart
