= Thompson Island (Massachusetts) =

Island in the Dorchester Bay section of Boston Harbor

Coordinates: 42.314133°N 71.010265°W

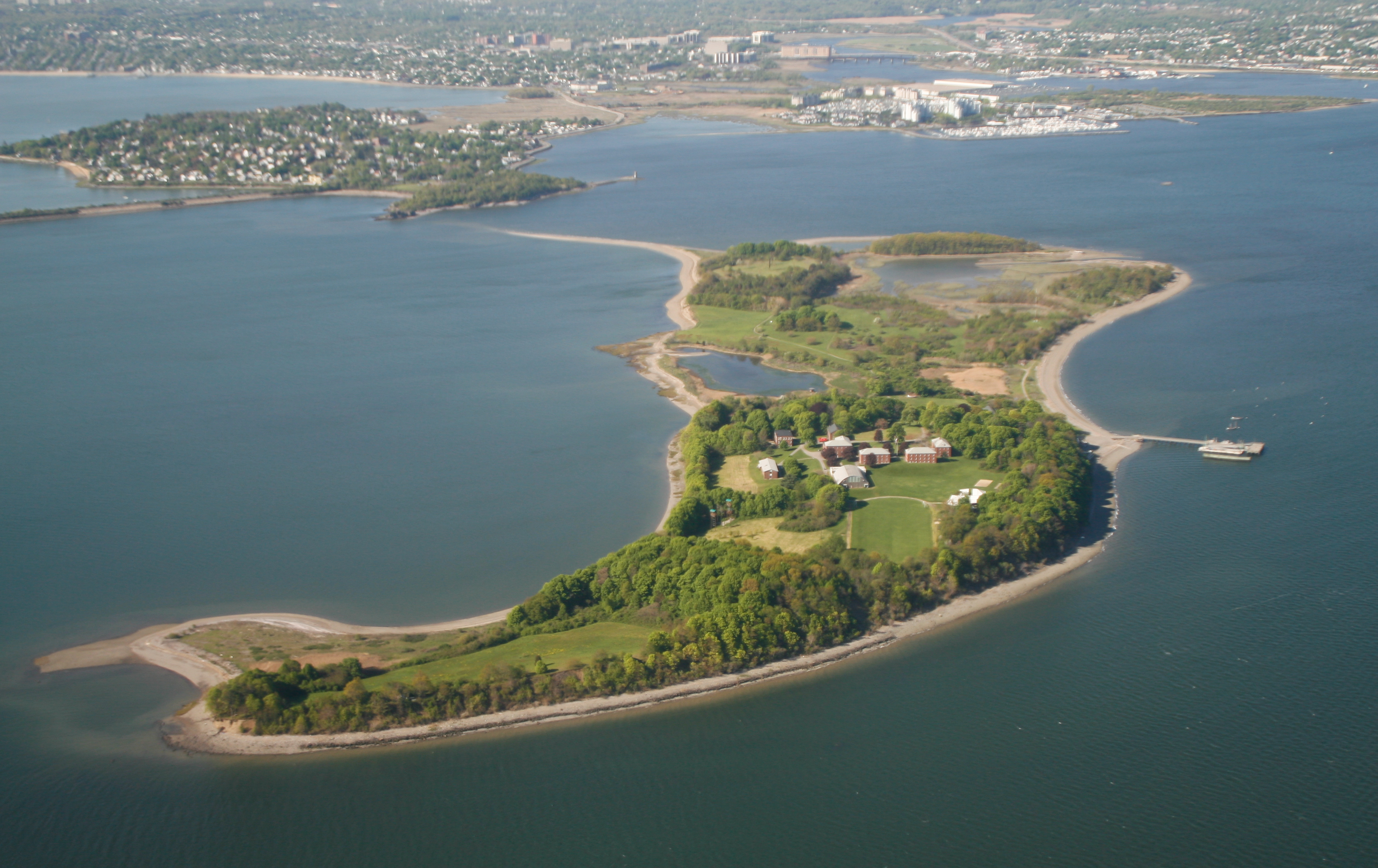
Thompson Island, Boston Harbor, 2008

Thompson Island, also known as Cathleen Stone Island, is a 170-acre (69 ha) island in the Dorchester Bay section of Boston Harbor, offshore from downtown Boston, Massachusetts. It is located slightly more than 4 miles (6.4 km) from Boston's Long Wharf via boat, while approximately 1 mile (1.6 km) straight-line distance from Boston's Columbia Point.

The island is managed by the Cathleen Stone Island Outward Bound Education Center, a non-profit education organization. The island is open to visitors on Saturdays and Sundays from Memorial Day through Labor Day; otherwise access is by arrangement only. Thompson Island is one of the largest, most accessible and ecologically diverse islands in the Boston Harbor Islands National Recreation Area.

The island's highest point is a drumlin that reaches a height of 78 feet (24 m) above sea level. The rest of the island comprises low rolling hills and a salt marsh. The island has a mixed vegetation, including hardwood tree stands, remnant pear and apple orchards, ornamental trees and shrubs, and salt marsh grasses. The island has open meadows, forests, marine wetlands, sumac groves, and a variety of other geological features as well. Amenities include a formal school campus complete with classrooms, dormitories, dining hall, auditoriums, gymnasium, lab space, outdoor challenge courses, and climbing towers. At low tide, a sandbar connects it to the Squantum peninsula, allowing land travel between the two.

== History ==
=== Native American and colonial settlement ===
Many Native American objects have been found on the island suggesting that the island was inhabited for many centuries prior to European contact. In September of 1621 Pilgrim Miles Standish was the first recorded person to visit the island while exploring the area, and he named it "Island Trevoyre" after his Mayflower shipmate, William Trevore. Standish believed that the island was uninhabited at that time. In 1626, four years before the Puritans arrived, David Thompson began living on the island where he had been conducting a trading post to trade with the Neponset Native Americans. Thompson, the namesake of the island, was a Scot who had been superintending the settlement of Sir Ferdinando Gorges and Captain John Mason near Portsmouth, New Hampshire. Thompson may have lived near the south end of Thompson Island where the foundation of a Puritan era house was discovered in 1889, although some believe this house may have dated to later in the seventeenth century by the size of the bricks. In 1628 David Thompson disappeared possibly as the result of drowning or foul play, and the town of Dorchester acquired the island. Thompson's son eventually regained title several years later after obtaining affidavits from William Blaxton, Miles Standish, Sagamore of Agawam, and William Trevore attesting to David Thompson's grant and occupancy. Thompson eventually lost title to the island in payment of his debts, and other private owners acquired title over the next several centuries who leased it to several families for farming.

=== Boys' school, 1833–1975 ===
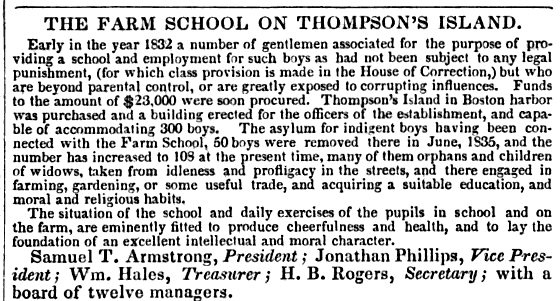
Farm School, Thompson's Island, 1838

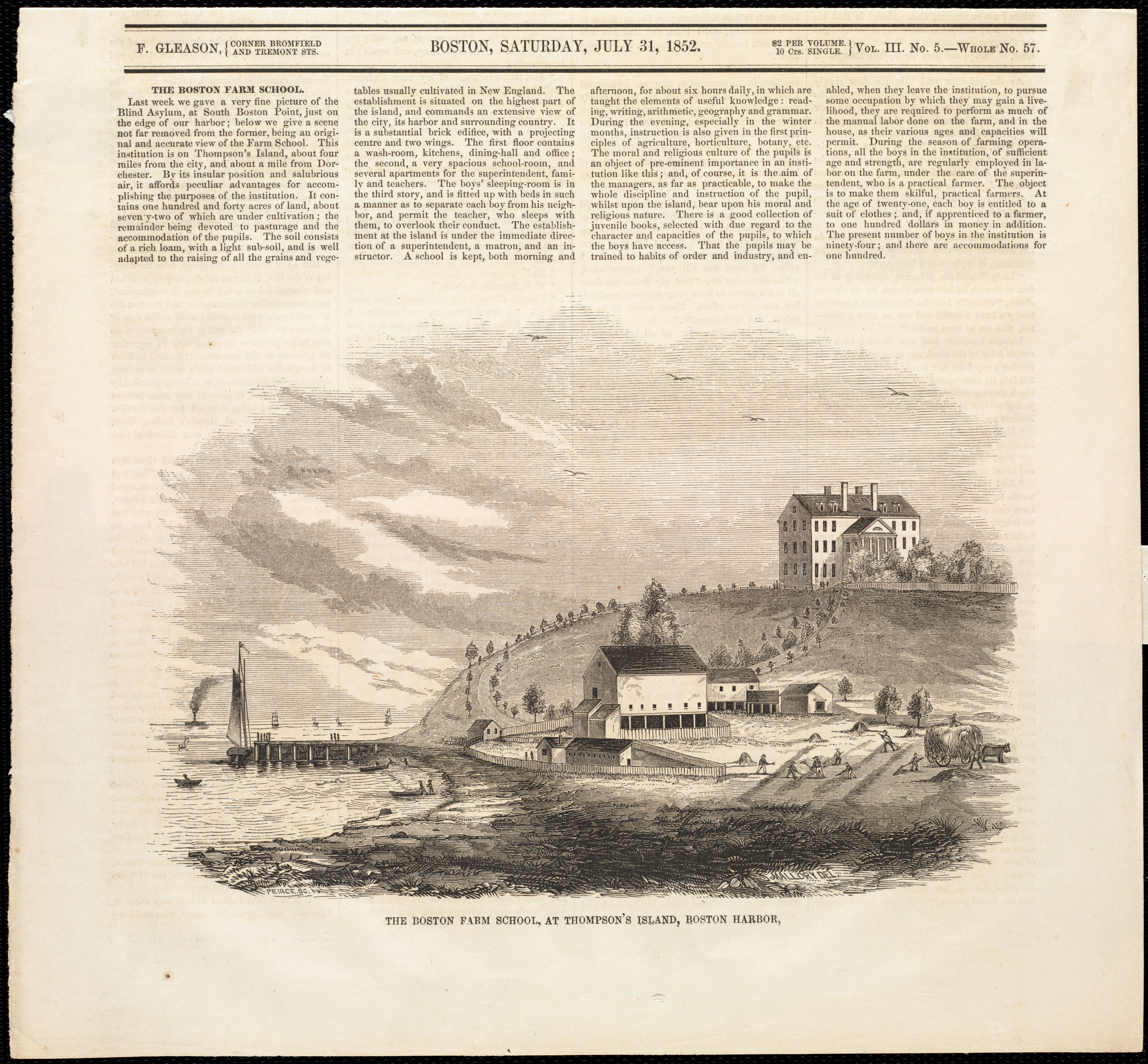
The Boston Farm School, at Thompson's Island, Boston Harbor, [July 31, 1852]. Boston Pictorial Archive (Collection of Distinction), Boston Public Library

In 1833, the Boston Asylum for Indigent Boys was moved to the island, and in 1835 it merged with the Boston Farm School Society to become the Boston Asylum and Farm School for Indigent Boys. Many of the students who went to school on the island lost one or both parents, or had parents who were unable to care for them. In order for a student to be enrolled in the school, the parents or guardians had to sign a form giving the school guardianship of the boys until they were 21 years old. While on the island, parents were only able to see their child once a month during visit days and for two weeks during the summer when the boys were allowed to return home. Many "distraught mothers" changed their minds about having their boys at the school and wanted to have them withdrawn. There are several documented cases where the school returned guardianship to the parents, who were then able to have their child come back home.

The boys and their teachers traveled back and forth between Kelly's Landing in South Boston and the Island via the boats "Pilgrim III" and its successor, "Pilgrim IV", regularly. There were two fatal boating accidents which resulted in the death of several students and faculty. The first was in 1842, where 29 individuals died. The second was in 1892, where 9 individuals died

In 1955 the name was changed again to Thompson Academy. Thompson Academy became a college preparatory boarding school and continued the tradition of shelter and guidance to boys from the Boston area and beyond. During some very turbulent times, the school was a model of successful community integration based on friendship and brotherhood for several hundred boys of all backgrounds each year during the late 60s and into the mid-70s. Students participated in private school sports leagues, involved themselves in meaningful community service projects in Boston, maintained educational ties with local colleges and universities and assisted with the upkeep of Thompson Island and their school. In 1971 a fire destroyed the main school building. The school continued to operate for another four years, closing in 1975.

In 2015, Connie Hertzberg Mayo published a historical fiction novel, The Island of Worthy Boys, set in late 19th century Boston and at the Boston Asylum and Farm School for Indigent Boys on Thompson Island. Superintendent Bradley (served 1888–1922) and his wife are prominent characters.

=== Outward Bound, 1994–present ===
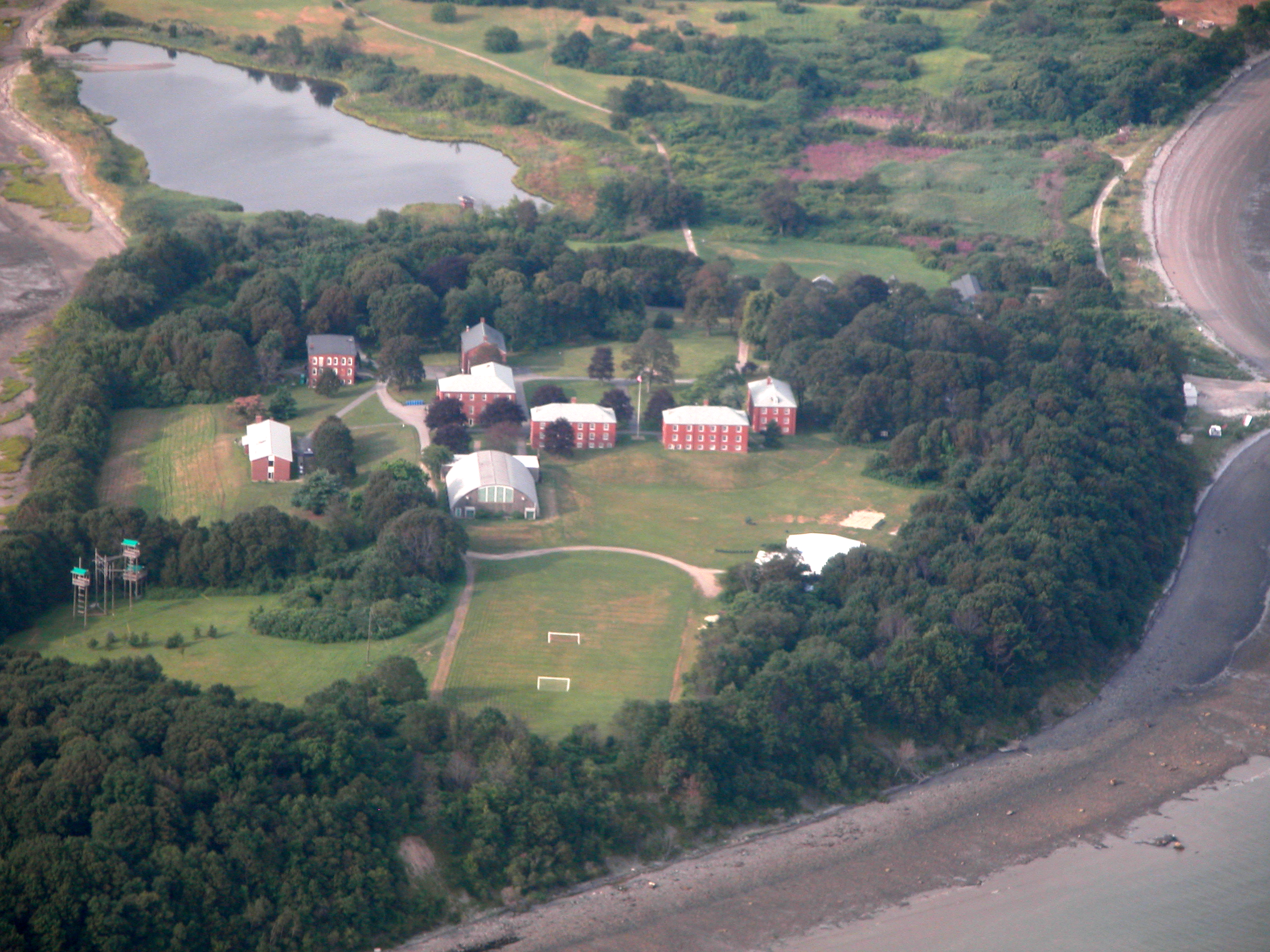
Thompson Island campus, 2006

In the early 1990s, David Manzo of Community Providers of Adolescent Services, Inc. d/b/a COMPASS, John Verre of the McKinley Schools, Edward F. Kelley of RFK Children's Action Corp, and Peter Willauer of Thompson Island Outward Bound Education Center, created a comprehensive residential treatment program called Citybound, for adolescents with emotional and behavioral disabilities on Thompson Island.

The Willauer School, an expeditionary learning Outward Bound school operated from 1994 to 2006. The island is currently owned by the Cathleen Stone Outward Bound Education Center and operates Outward Bound programs that brings more than 5,000 students and 3,000 adults a year to the island. Thompson Island Outward Bound supports its mission through donations and profits from Thompson Island Conference Center (event business running corporate outings and social events) and Outward Bound Professional (adult team-building).

In 2024, the organization that owns and operates the school and island announced their receipt of a $12 million gift from the James M. and Cathleen D. Stone Foundation and renamed the school to honor Cathleen Stone, an environmental lawyer and the city of Boston's former Chief of Ecological Services. They also announced their intention to rename the island itself, though that will require approval from the United States Board of Geographic Names.

== Boston Harbor Islands Protected Space ==
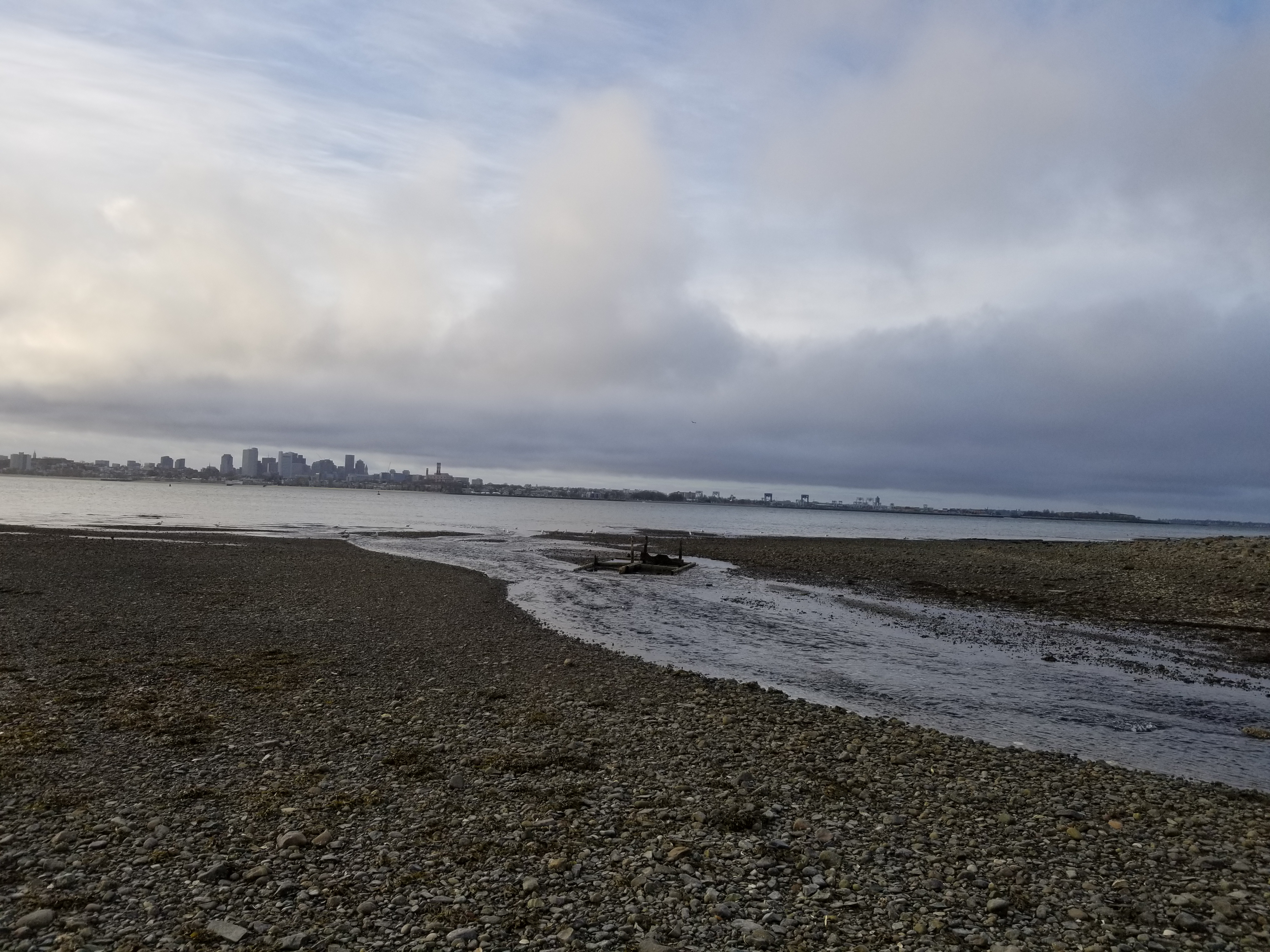
Seawater entering the lagoon on Thompson Island with South Boston visible in the background

In 2002, the National Park Service and the Massachusetts Department of Environmental Management purchased a conservation restriction for Thompson Island. With the assistance of The Trust for Public Land, who helped negotiate the deal, future development was limited to only the existing school campus. It also guaranteed permanent public access to the island, completing the permanent protection of all of the Boston Harbor Islands. Representative Joseph Moakely was instrumental in raising the $2 million of funding appropriated by Congress, and another $2 million matched by Massachusetts.

== In popular culture ==
In Season 3 of the WGBH children's reality game show Fetch! With Ruff Ruffman, in the episode "What's Bugging Ruff?", Thompson Island is where Jay, Noel & Sammy are sent for their challenge of learning about various species of insects.

In the 2018 novel Varina by Charles Frazier (which is based on the life of Varina Davis, wife of Jefferson Davis), the fictional African American character Jimmy recounts how he spent several happy years at the Thompson Island Farm School in the late 1860s.
