= Alexander Stewart, Earl of Mar =

15th-century Scottish nobleman

Alexander Stewart
- Earl of Mar; Lord of Badenoch and Lochaber
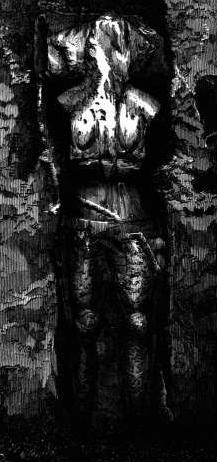
- Supposed effigy of Alexander in the Blackfriars of Inverness
- Born: c. 1375; Scotland
- Died: July 1435 (aged c. 60); Mar, Scotland
- Burial: Blackfriars of Inverness
- Spouse: Isabel Douglas, Countess of Mar (m. 1404; d. 1408); Marie van Hoorn (m. c. 1411; d. 1434)
- Issue: Thomas Stewart; Janet Stewart
- House: Stewart
- Father: Alexander Stewart, Earl of Buchan
- Mother: Mairead inghean Eachainn

Alexander Stewart (c. 1375 - July 1435) was a Scottish nobleman and warlord. An illegitimate grandson of Robert II of Scotland, he held the title of Earl of Mar, exercising significant power over northeastern Scotland. His military career included service in the Duchy of Burgundy, along with battles at Harlaw, Lochaber, and Inverlochy against the Lordship of the Isles.

== Origins and early life ==
Alexander was born in c. 1375. He was an illegitimate son of Alexander Stewart, Lord of Badenoch, and his longtime mistress, Mairead inghean Eachainn. Alexander's father, who later gained the title of Earl of Buchan, was the fourth son of Robert II of Scotland. The earl married Euphemia, Countess of Ross, in 1382, in a political match supported by Alexander's grandfather, the king. The earl's continued relationship with Alexander's mother, however, led to the collapse of this marriage by 1392.

Alexander's early years remain obscure. Some of his younger brothers participated in the infamous Raid of Angus early in 1392, for which they were condemned by a general council of the kingdom. Alexander was linked with the death of Malcolm Drummond, Lord of Mar, a relative and ally of his cousin, David, Duke of Rothesay, in 1402. Alexander was alleged to have murdered Drummond after the latter had been arrested by Robert, Duke of Albany, Alexander's paternal uncle, as part of a coup against Rothesay. Despite these claims, there is no evidence that Alexander was involved in the events of 1402. Alexander's alleged murder of Drummond was likely invented by later historians to create a narrative link between the chronicle of Andrew of Wyntoun, which described Drummond's imprisonment, and Alexander's later marriage to Drummond's widow.

== Career ==
The events of 1402, including Drummond's death, left a power vacuum in the earldom of Mar. Alexander moved quickly for the hand of Drummond's widow, Isabel Douglas, Countess of Mar. Alexander's uncle, Robert, Duke of Albany, opposed his planned marriage to Isabella. Albany likely sought to establish his political allies, the Erskine family, as earls of Mar in opposition to the Douglas family. Despite this challenge, Alexander was able to gain the support of another of his paternal uncles, King Robert III, who negotiated a settlement between Alexander's supporters and the Erskine affinity. Alexander married Isabella at Kildrummy Castle on 9 December 1404, and thereby became Earl of Mar jure uxoris.

Alexander traveled to England in 1406, where he jousted with Edmund Holland, 4th Earl of Kent, at a tournament in London.

=== Burgundy, remarriage, and reputation ===
Alexander journeyed to the Duchy of Burgundy in 1408, probably seeking the income which could be gained from mercenary service, and joined the army of John the Fearless, Duke of Burgundy. He fought at the Battle of Othée on 23 September 1408. Alexander and his Scottish contingent were praised for their performance in the battle, which saw the Burgundian ruler defeat the rebellious citizens of Liège. Andrew of Wyntoun claimed that Alexander led the vanguard of the Burgundian army.

Alexander's first wife, Isabel, Countess of Mar, died in 1408. Despite the death of his wife, Alexander continued to hold the title of Earl of Mar in liferent under the original terms of his marriage. Alexander married a German noblewoman, Marie van Hoorn, the daughter of Willem, Lord of Duffel, as his second wife between August 1410 and March 1411. Within a decade, Alexander's service in Burgundy had given him a significant European reputation as a military commander. Charles, Dauphin of France, recognized Alexander's martial reputation in 1419, when he addressed requests for military aid to Alexander and other Scottish noblemen.

Alexander stirred controversy in Europe by pursuing piracy on the North Sea, prompting the Hanseatic League to ban the importation of Scottish wool in 1415.

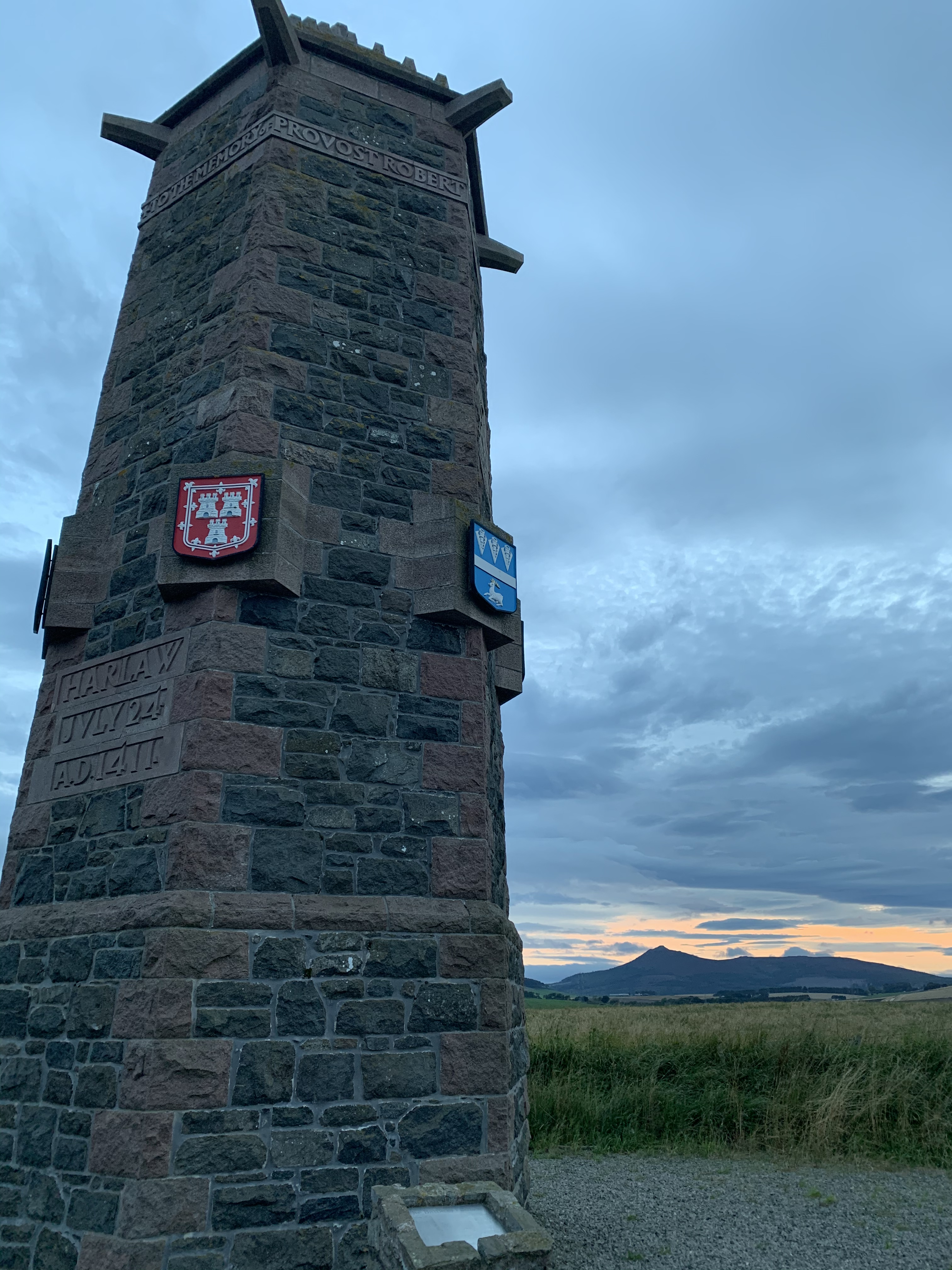
A monument to the Battle of Harlaw, fought between Alexander and Donald of Islay in 1411.

=== Battle of Harlaw ===
Alexander's military reputation was secured at the Battle of Harlaw on 24 July 1411, where he led the army of his uncle, Robert, Duke of Albany, who had now become Governor of Scotland, against Donald, Lord of the Isles. The battle was the culmination of a feud between the governor and the Lord of the Isles over the earldom of Ross. After gathering a large army, Donald attacked and burned Inverness early in 1411. The governor, who was unable to come north in person, appointed Alexander to defend northeastern Scotland, and particularly the city of Aberdeen, against Donald's army. The ensuing battle at Harlaw, near Inverurie, ended in a tactical stalemate. Alexander's army seems to have suffered severe losses on the battlefield. Despite his failure to gain a decisive victory, Alexander succeeded in forcing Donald to retreat back to the Outer Hebrides.

Alexander's defense of Aberdeen in 1411 established him as the dominant nobleman in northeastern Scotland. Alexander was appointed as "lieutenant" of the northeast, a quasi-viceregal position, by both Robert, Duke of Albany, and Murdoch, his son and successor. During the imprisonment of his cousin, King James I, in England, Alexander received over £3,500 from the regency government. Murdoch, Duke of Albany, appointed Alexander as Admiral of Scotland in 1423.

=== Return of the king ===
By the autumn of 1423, renewed negotiations were underway for the release of James I from his captivity at the court of Henry VI of England. During this tense period, Alexander allied himself with the governor, Murdoch, Duke of Albany, who was wary of the king's potential return. Alexander feared that James I would cancel his pension and special jurisdiction over the northeast. The king ultimately returned to Scotland in April 1424, and Alexander attended his coronation at Scone. Although he attempted to befriend his cousin, Alexander was unable to prevent James I from cancelling his pension and regality powers. Alexander was likely outraged when the king recognized the claim of Alexander, Lord of the Isles, the son of his enemy at Harlaw, to the earldom of Ross towards the end of 1424.

Alexander was able to restore his relationship with James I during the Christmas holiday of 1424, when he came to a political agreement with the king. Alexander offered his support to James I against Murdoch, Duke of Albany, whom the king was planning to arrest for treason. In exchange, the king promised to support the succession of Thomas Stewart, Alexander's illegitimate son, to the earldom of Mar. Alexander sat on the jury which condemned Murdoch, Duke of Albany, Duncan, Earl of Lennox, and two of the duke's sons to death by beheading in May 1425. The king fulfilled his promise when he formally regranted the earldom of Mar to Alexander, under an entail to Thomas, in May 1426. Alexander received another reward for his loyalty in January 1427, with the king's grant of the lordship of Badenoch.

=== Apotheosis of career ===
In the years after James I's return to Scotland, the king's relationship with Alexander of Islay, Lord of the Isles, began to decline. Alexander offered his support to the king when the latter arrested the Lord of the Isles and his mother, Mariota, Countess of Ross, in 1428. Open warfare erupted between James I and the lord's Clan Donald kinsmen the following year. Alexander and his affinity participated in the king's campaign against the Lord of the Isles and his family, which culminated in the Battle of Lochaber on 23 June 1429. Alexander's support of James I in 1429 allowed him to recover the preeminent position he had held under the Dukes of Albany. The king returned practical control of northeastern Scotland to Alexander, under the customary title of "lieutenant". Alexander was additionally rewarded in 1430 with the king's grant of Lochaber, which had previously been held by Alasdair Carrach, one of his enemies at Harlaw. Although James I viewed his cousin as a dependable royal official, Alexander himself likely accepted the king's support with the aim of increasing his own local power.

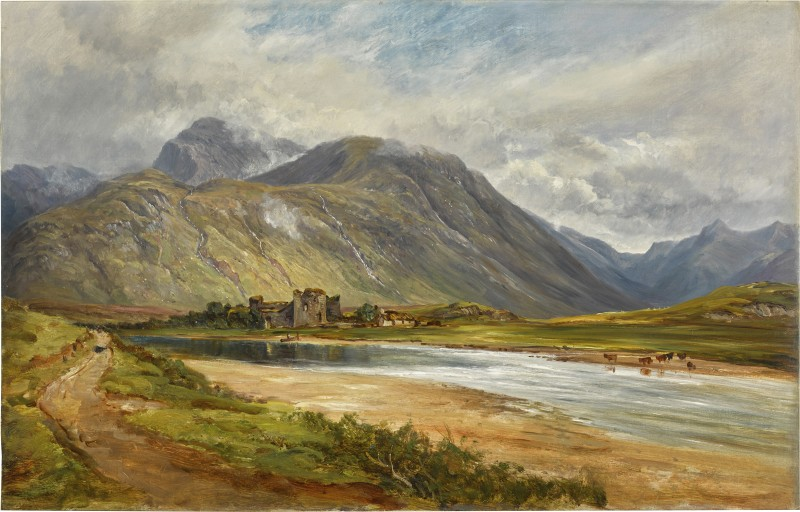
Alexander's defeat at the Battle of Inverlochy, fought near Inverlochy Castle in 1431, marked the end of his martial career.

With his authority in northeastern Scotland strengthened, Alexander took a leading role in royal campaigns against Clan Donald and Clan Mackay. Alexander worked actively to weaken the Lordship of the Isles by arranging the marriage of his daughter, Janet, to Lachlan MacLean, a prominent figure in the lordship. Alexander's cousin, Alan Stewart, Earl of Caithness, was appointed as his military deputy in the north in 1431. A new royal campaign against the Lordship of the Isles began during the summer of that year. Alexander raised a large army to expel Alasdair Carrach and his supporters from Lochaber. Alexander, whom the king had appointed to command the campaign, likely chose to target Carrach in order to secure his own control of Lochaber, which he now claimed as its lord.

The ensuing war resulted in disaster for Alexander. His army encountered a small force led by Carrach and Donald Balloch at Inverlochy in September 1431, where it was heavily defeated. The army of the Islesmen caught Alexander's forces by surprise and routed them from the field, killing the Earl of Caithness and several knights. Alexander, who was allegedly playing a card game when the attack began, escaped the battle on foot and fled towards Kildrummy Castle. Alexander reportedly composed a Gaelic couplet to commemorate his escape from the battle. Alexander's defeat at Inverlochy was followed by the Battle of Drumnacoub, where the men of Clan Mackay defeated the forces of his local allies, led by Angus Murray of Pilrossie. The events of 1431 were followed by several years of peace in northern Scotland, as James I was unable to secure taxation from the Scottish parliament for any new military campaigns.

== Dynastic failure and death ==
Alexander failed to produce legitimate children by either of his two wives. By 1424, he was proposing the succession of his illegitimate son, Thomas Stewart, to his lands in lieu of a legitimate heir. Thomas' confirmation as Alexander's heir in May 1426 was coupled with his betrothal to Elizabeth Douglas, the sister of Archibald Douglas, 5th Earl of Douglas, and the widow of John Stewart, Earl of Buchan. Thomas' marriage to Elizabeth, which was confirmed the following year, awarded him various estates in the earldom of Buchan. Thomas' death in 1430, without children of his own, represented a significant blow to Alexander. The terms of the 1426 regrant of the earldom of Mar now worked against Alexander, as the king replaced Thomas as heir to the earldom through reversion. Alexander's second wife, Marie van Hoorn, died in c. 1433, removing any remaining chance for a legitimate heir.

Alexander died on his demesne land in July 1435. His body was taken to Inverness, where it was buried at the Dominican monastery of the Blackfriars on 26 July. Alexander's death resulted in a dispute between James I and the Erskine family over the earldom of Mar. The king ultimately gained control of the earldom, while some of Alexander's lands were given to his former daughter-in-law, Elizabeth Douglas, through her right of terce.

== Issue ==
Despite his lack of legitimate heirs, Alexander produced at least two illegitimate children by unknown mothers.

- Thomas (d. 1430). He held the title of Lord of Badenoch before his death. He married Elizabeth Douglas, daughter of Archibald Douglas, 4th Earl of Douglas, with whom he had no issue.
- Janet (d. c. 1485), who married Lachlan MacLean in c. 1430. Janet is called Margaret in some sources. She had at least one son, Lachlan MacLean, called "the younger" to distinguish him from his father.
