= Plantations of New England =

Colonised area of North America from 1616

Plantations of New England were a series of colonisation efforts by Europeans on the east coast of North America, a land that they called New England.

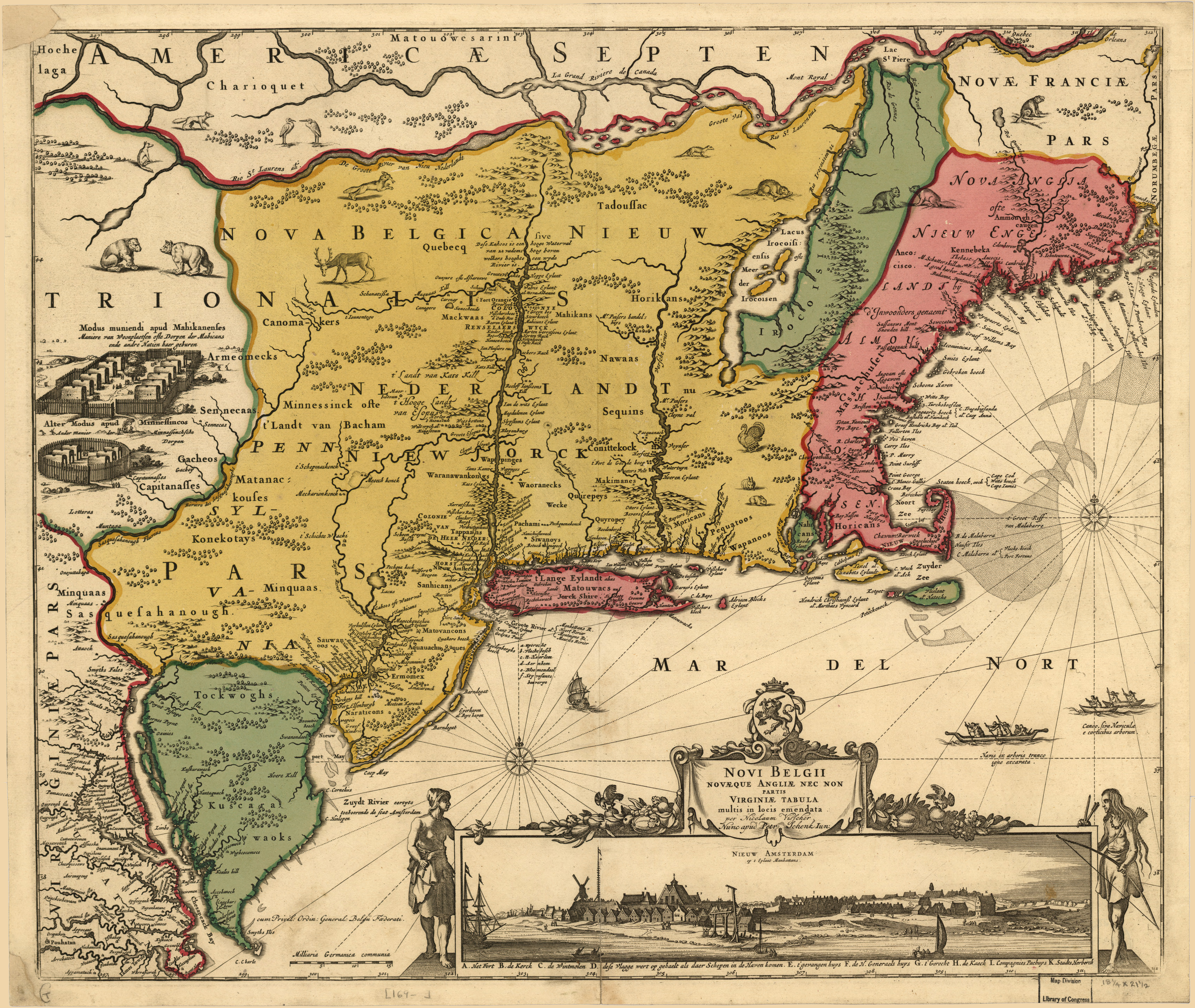
A seventeenth century map shows New England as a coastal enclave extending from Cape Cod to New France while its interior is rendered New Belgium, New Netherland and Iroquois Confederacy

New England dates to the earliest days of European settlement: in 1616, Captain John Smith described the area in a pamphlet "New England." The name was officially sanctioned in 1620 by the grant of King James I to the Plymouth Council for New England.

The region was subsequently divided through further grants, including the 1629 royal grant of "Hampshire" which was issued for "making a Plantation & establishing of a Colony or Colonyes in the Countrey called or known by ye name of New England in America."

The role plantations played in New England's economy in the past was not as significant as the role agriculture played in the Southern colonies. The soil was also very rocky and wasn't good for farming

== History of Agriculture in New England ==
=== Native American Land Use ===
Agricultural activity existed in New England before European settlers arrived in the region. By the time colonizers arrived, "Native American agriculture in southern New England had developed into a well-ordered system". The majority of the civilian diet came from corn (maize), which was planted "in hills in clearings the Native cut in the woods". Relative to the role played by the agricultural sector in southern New England, agriculture was less well developed in northern New England due to the shorter growing season. As such, the majority of the diet in the north came from hunting, fishing, and "gathering wild berries and nuts". Plantations in southern New England also included farming of beans, squash, and pumpkins, which were planted with the corn. Additionally, though the tobacco industry thrived to a much greater extent in Southern colonies, tobacco was also grown to a relatively lesser extent in New England. Other crops included melons and strawberries.

By the time the colonizers settled, the agricultural system was cyclical in that fields were cleared of trees, then used for five or more years, after which they naturally reverted to woodland as a consequence of how quickly forests regenerated in the New England area. With respect to relative male to female involvement in plantations, though farm work was mostly conducted by the women, men were more involved in tobacco cultivation.

=== Colonial Land Use ===
Though agricultural activity existed in New England before early colonial settlers arrived, land was barely touched relative to the massive plantation scales seen in England at the time. As such, early settlers were greeted with great opportunities to utilize the kinds of land use improvements previously implemented in England. Up until the colonial time period, there was a significant amount of unused land that was characterized by undeveloped wilderness. The primary improvement that settlers brought about was thus the recreation of the English farming system that efficiently utilized the vast areas of untamed wilderness. However, relative to the massive for-profit cash-crop plantations in the South, plantations in New England were small-scale and meant mainly for subsistence purposes rather than profit-making.

With the improvements came a complication: the English methods of the time were unsustainable in the New England region, such that much of the land was worn out by the early 1800s. This paved the way for another improvement in the agricultural system, namely the use of applied science to make crop production more efficient and sustainable.

== Industrialization & Agriculture ==
The half-century period before the Civil War, more generally between 1800 and 1900, saw the "development of New England manufactures and the rise of new factory villages and towns". This brought about significant changes to the agricultural system in the region, specifically through new demands for raw materials and food. Though demand was quick to change, supply remained fixed for a long period of time due to the "inherent inflexibility of the agricultural industry". However, with the development of railroads by 1840, supply was pretty much forced to change and meet demand. This occurred due to the sudden drop in transportation costs, and thus how competitive the agricultural sector became as a result of the newer farms utilizing newer technologies in the New York area. Farmers elsewhere in New England had to institute similar changes in capital to match the increase in competition by making farming in plantations more efficient and productive. Though such changes were made reluctantly, they were the steps that resulted in what would thereafter be referred to as an agricultural revolution.

== Other Northern Colony Planting ==
Though most plantations and large farms in Northern colonies were in New England, New York, and other Mid-Atlantic Colonies also had a large agricultural industry. One notable farm or "plantation" in New York is the Montskill Estate.

== Conclusion ==
Evident from the evolution of agricultural systems, products, and significance in the region, plantations in New England clearly played an important role in ensuring that local demand for food was satisfied by local supply, and that profit-opportunities in the sector were exhausted through utilization of technological changes that occurred in the colonial era.
