= PA postcode area =

Postcode area within the United Kingdom

Paisley
- Postcode area
- Coordinates: 55.921°N 4.790°W
- Country: United Kingdom
- Postcode area: PA
- Postcode area name: Paisley
- Post towns: 35
- Postcode districts: 77
- Postcode sectors: 114
- Postcodes (live): 9,357
- Postcodes (total): 12,921
- Statistics as at May 2020

The PA postcode area, also known as the Paisley postcode area, is a group of 67 postcode districts in western Scotland, within 35 post towns. These cover Renfrewshire (including Paisley, Renfrew, Johnstone, Bishopton, Erskine, Bridge of Weir and Lochwinnoch), Inverclyde (including Greenock, Port Glasgow, Gourock, Kilmacolm and Wemyss Bay) and most of Argyll and Bute (including Oban, Lochgilphead, Tarbert, Campbeltown, Appin, Taynuilt, Bridge of Orchy, Dalmally, Inveraray, Cairndow, Colintraive, Dunoon, Tighnabruaich, and the Isles of Mull, Iona, Coll, Tiree, Jura, Colonsay, Islay, Gigha and Bute), plus small parts of North Ayrshire (including Skelmorlie) and Highland.

Mail for the PA postcode area is processed at Glasgow Mail Centre, along with mail for the G, ML, KA and ZE postcode areas.

== Coverage ==
The approximate coverage of the postcode districts:

Postcode district	Post town	Coverage	Local authority area(s)
PA1	PAISLEY	Paisley (central, east and north east), Ralston	Renfrewshire
PA2	PAISLEY	Paisley (south), Castlehead	Renfrewshire, and a small rural area in East Renfrewshire
PA3	PAISLEY	Paisley (north west), Linwood	Renfrewshire
PA4	RENFREW	Renfrew, Inchinnan	Renfrewshire
PA5	JOHNSTONE	Johnstone, Brookfield, Elderslie	Renfrewshire
PA6	JOHNSTONE	Johnstone, Houston	Renfrewshire
PA7	BISHOPTON	Bishopton	Renfrewshire
PA8	ERSKINE	Erskine	Renfrewshire
PA9	JOHNSTONE	Johnstone, Howwood	Renfrewshire
PA10	JOHNSTONE	Johnstone, Kilbarchan	Renfrewshire
PA11	BRIDGE OF WEIR	Bridge of Weir, Quarrier's Village	Renfrewshire
PA12	LOCHWINNOCH	Lochwinnoch, Newton of Belltrees	Renfrewshire
PA13	KILMACOLM	Kilmacolm	Inverclyde
PA14	PORT GLASGOW	Port Glasgow, Langbank	Inverclyde
PA15	GREENOCK	Greenock	Inverclyde
PA16	GREENOCK	Greenock, Inverkip	Inverclyde
PA17	SKELMORLIE	Skelmorlie	North Ayrshire
PA18	WEMYSS BAY	Wemyss Bay	Inverclyde
PA19	GOUROCK	Gourock	Inverclyde
PA20	ISLE OF BUTE	Isle of Bute	Argyll and Bute
PA21	TIGHNABRUAICH	Tighnabruaich	Argyll and Bute
PA22	COLINTRAIVE	Colintraive, Glendaruel	Argyll and Bute
PA23	DUNOON	Dunoon	Argyll and Bute
PA24	CAIRNDOW	Lochgoilhead	Argyll and Bute
PA25	CAIRNDOW	St. Catherines	Argyll and Bute
PA26	CAIRNDOW	Cairndow	Argyll and Bute
PA27	CAIRNDOW	Strachur	Argyll and Bute
PA28	CAMPBELTOWN	Campbeltown	Argyll and Bute
PA29	TARBERT	Tarbert	Argyll and Bute
PA30	LOCHGILPHEAD	Ardrishaig	Argyll and Bute
PA31	LOCHGILPHEAD	Lochgilphead, Cairnbaan, Crinan, Kilmartin	Argyll and Bute
PA32	INVERARAY	Inveraray	Argyll and Bute
PA33	DALMALLY	Dalmally	Argyll and Bute
PA34	OBAN	Oban	Argyll and Bute
PA35	TAYNUILT	Taynuilt	Argyll and Bute
PA36	BRIDGE OF ORCHY	Bridge of Orchy	Argyll and Bute
PA37	OBAN	Connel, Benderloch	Argyll and Bute
PA38	APPIN	Appin	Argyll and Bute, Highland
PA41	ISLE OF GIGHA	Gigha	Argyll and Bute
PA42	ISLE OF ISLAY	Port Ellen	Argyll and Bute
PA43	ISLE OF ISLAY	Bowmore	Argyll and Bute
PA44	ISLE OF ISLAY	Bridgend	Argyll and Bute
PA45	ISLE OF ISLAY	Ballygrant	Argyll and Bute
PA46	ISLE OF ISLAY	Port Askaig	Argyll and Bute
PA47	ISLE OF ISLAY	Portnahaven	Argyll and Bute
PA48	ISLE OF ISLAY	Port Charlotte	Argyll and Bute
PA49	ISLE OF ISLAY	Bruichladdich	Argyll and Bute
PA60	ISLE OF JURA	Jura	Argyll and Bute
PA61	ISLE OF COLONSAY	Colonsay	Argyll and Bute
PA62	ISLE OF MULL	Lochbuie	Argyll and Bute
PA63	ISLE OF MULL	Croggan	Argyll and Bute
PA64	ISLE OF MULL	Lochdon	Argyll and Bute
PA65	ISLE OF MULL	Craignure	Argyll and Bute
PA66	ISLE OF MULL	Fionnphort	Argyll and Bute
PA67	ISLE OF MULL	Bunessan	Argyll and Bute
PA68	ISLE OF MULL	Gribun	Argyll and Bute
PA69	ISLE OF MULL	Tiroran	Argyll and Bute
PA70	ISLE OF MULL	Pennyghael	Argyll and Bute
PA71	ISLE OF MULL	Gruline	Argyll and Bute
PA72	ISLE OF MULL	Aros, Salen	Argyll and Bute
PA73	ISLE OF MULL	Ulva Ferry	Argyll and Bute
PA74	ISLE OF MULL	Torloisk	Argyll and Bute
PA75	ISLE OF MULL	Tobermory, Calgary	Argyll and Bute
PA76	ISLE OF IONA	Iona	Argyll and Bute
PA77	ISLE OF TIREE	Tiree	Argyll and Bute
PA78	ISLE OF COLL	Coll	Argyll and Bute
PA80	OBAN	Morvern	Highland

Ballachulish and Kinlochleven were originally coded PA39 and PA40 respectively, before being transferred to the PH area in 1999 as PH49 and PH50. The PA80 district was formed out of the PA34 district in 2011 following a campaign by residents of Morvern.

Until January 1995, PA80 to PA87 were allocated to the islands of the Outer Hebrides, after which these formed the HS postcode area.

== Map ==
PA postcode area map, showing postcode districts in red and post towns in grey text, with links to nearby BT, FK, G, KA and PH postcode areas.

Detailed map of postcode districts and post towns in and around Paisley

== See also ==
- Postcode Address File
- List of postcode areas in the United Kingdom
