= Fionnphort =

Coordinates: 56.325°N 6.365°W

Fionnphort: Scottish Gaelic: Fionnphort
- Village
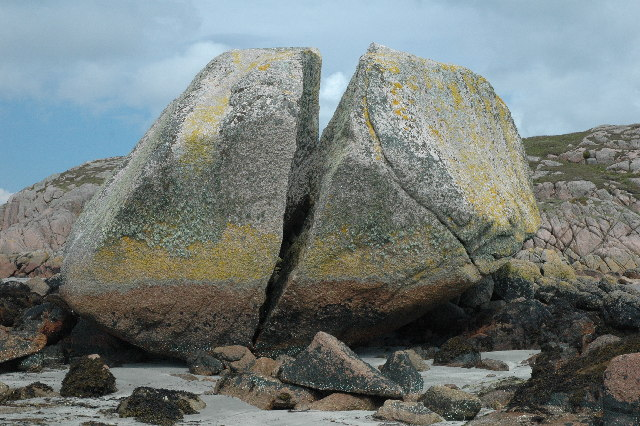
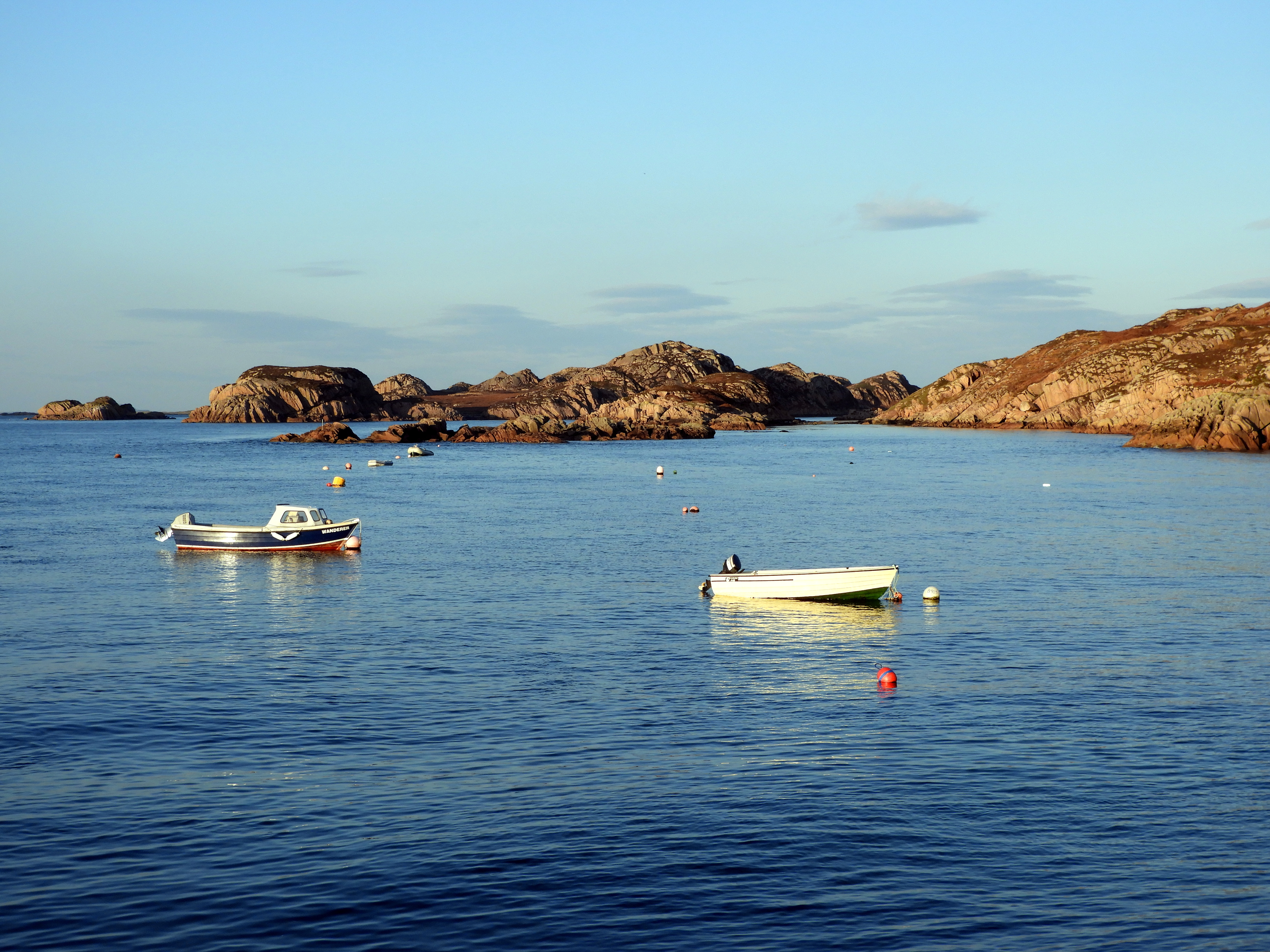
- Fionnphort from the Sound of Iona Fingal's Rock Fionnphort bay

- Location within Argyll and Bute
- Population: 80 (approx.)
- OS grid reference: NM301232
- Council area: Argyll and Bute
- Lieutenancy area: Argyll and Bute
- Country: Scotland
- Sovereign state: United Kingdom
- Post town: ISLE OF MULL
- Postcode district: PA66
- Dialling code: 01681
- Police: Scotland
- Fire: Scottish
- Ambulance: Scottish
- UK Parliament: Argyll, Bute and South Lochaber
- Scottish Parliament: Argyll and Bute

Fionnphort (Note: English: /ˈfɪnəfɔːrt/, Scottish Gaelic: [ˈfjun̪ˠafɔrˠt̪]) is the principal port of the Ross of Mull, and the second largest settlement in the area (its population is approximately 80). The village's name is the anglicised pronunciation of the Gaelic for "White Port" and previous names have included Caol Idhe, Gaelic for "Sound of Iona".

== History ==
Historically, Fionnphort has been a fishing village offering religious pilgrims and tourists access to Iona; more recently, it has facilitated the movement of stone from a quarry in the vicinity. The granite which was extracted from Tòrr Mòr Quarry until around 1907 was highly prized for its density and hardness.

== Geography ==
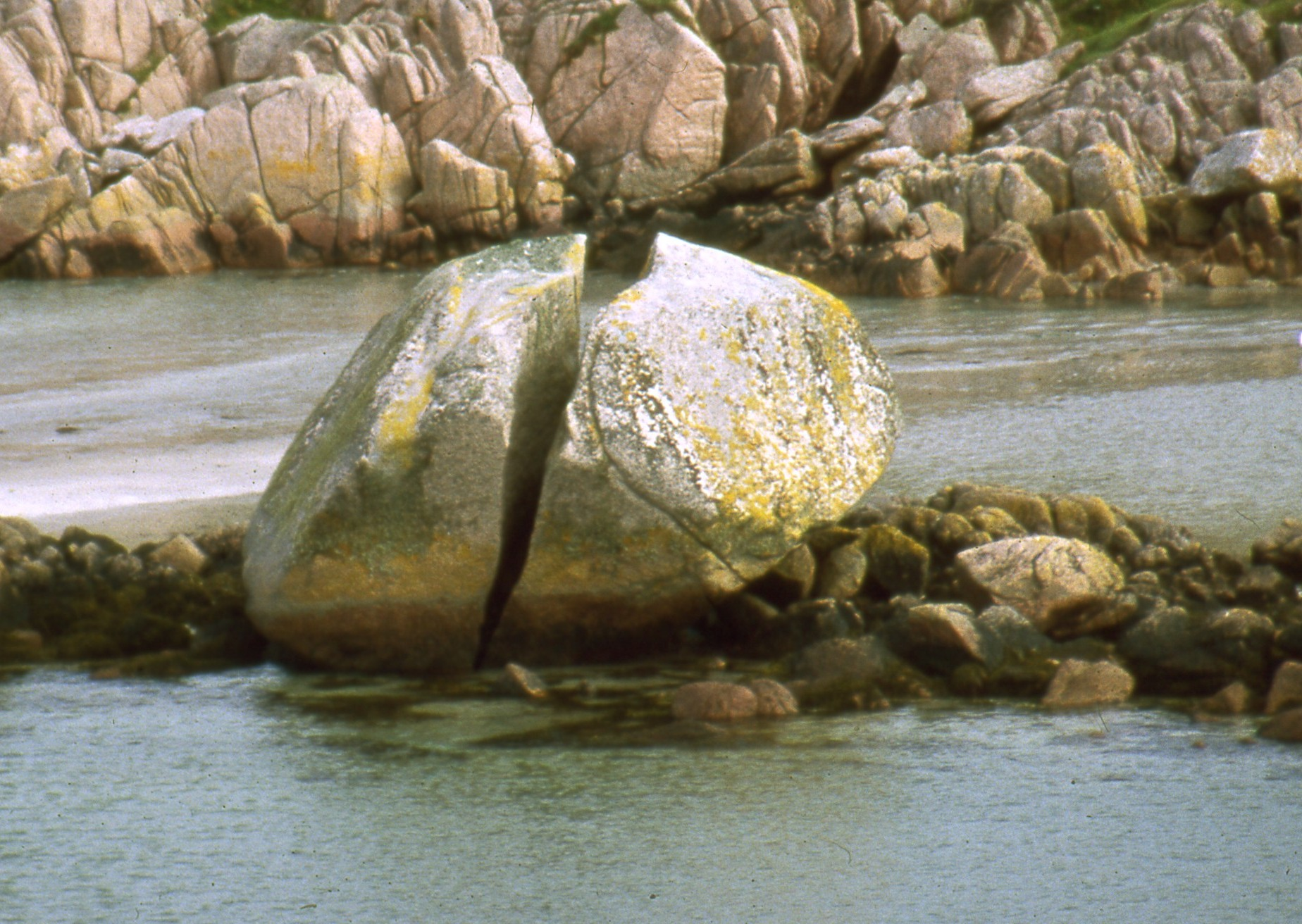
Cracked granite boulder on Fionnphort beach

The beach at Fionnphort has a distinctive split granite boulder in the centre that is classed as an erratic and deposited here by an ice age glacier. The beach has a car park and a nearby cemetery.

From Fionnphort, the entire east side of Iona can be seen, including Iona Abbey. To the south of the village lies the district of Fidden and the island of Erraid, mentioned in Robert Louis Stevenson's novel Kidnapped and accessible to walkers at low tide.

== Economy ==
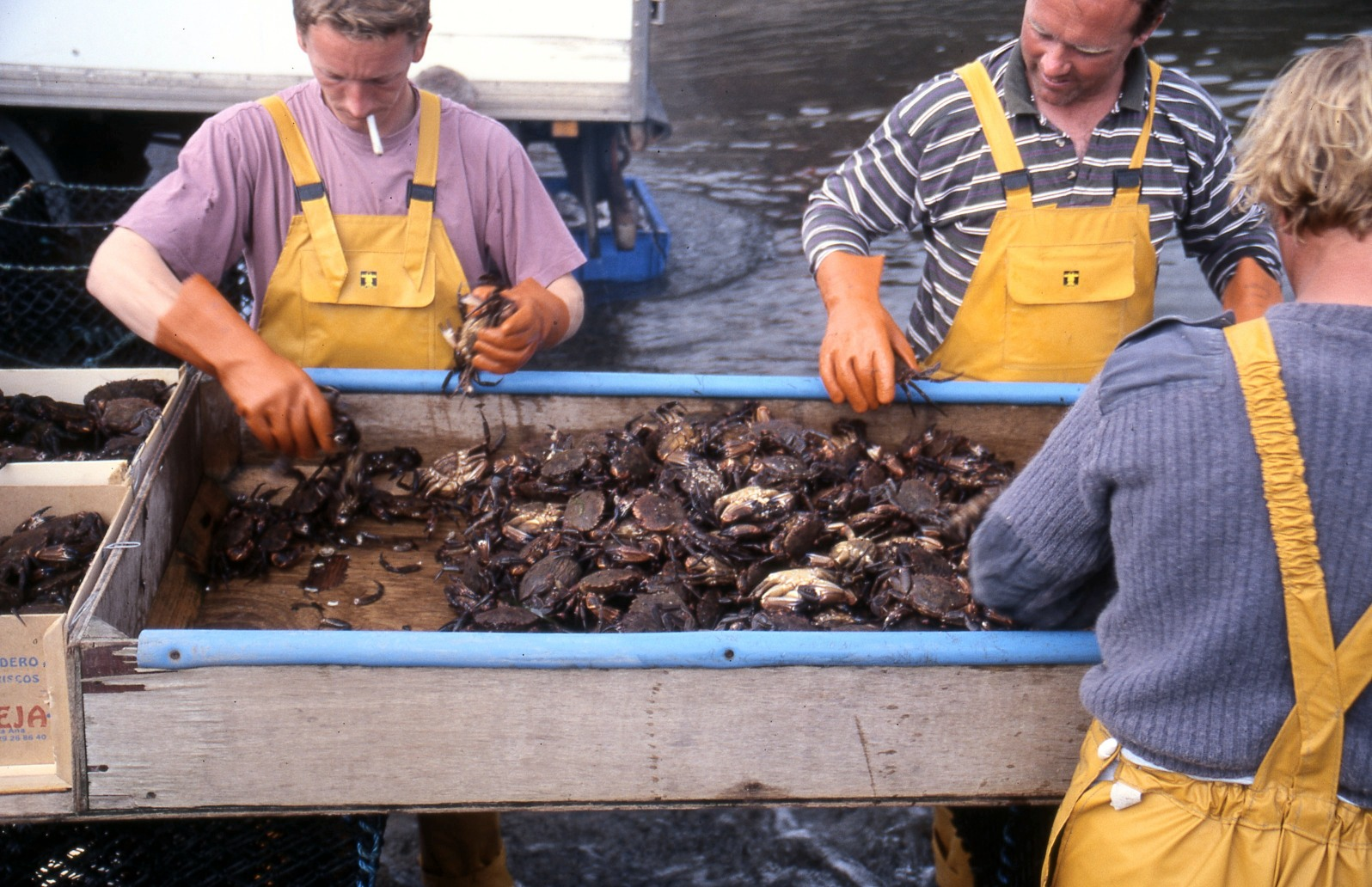
Sorting crabs at Fionnphort

Fionnphort has an active fishing industry, noted principally for shellfish, particularly crabs and lobsters, the majority of which are exported by container truck to Spain and France.

In April 2008, residents finally had the opportunity to use a cash machine, putting an end to the 100-mile (160-kilometre) round-trip to Salen villagers previously had to endure. Sandy Brunton, the local postmaster said that residents are claiming they now have the best view from a cash dispenser anywhere in Britain: "As you stand at the ATM, you have a view of Iona to the west, Coll to the north and looking east you can see the island's only Munro, Ben More."

== Transport ==
Fionnphort is the base of the ferry service between Mull and Iona, and also boat trips to the isle of Staffa.

Preceding station	Caledonian MacBrayne	Following station
Iona Terminus	Iona ferry	Terminus
