= Ballygrant =

Village on the Isle of Islay, Scotland

Coordinates: 55.82°N 6.16°W

Ballygrant: Scottish Gaelic: Baile a' Ghràna
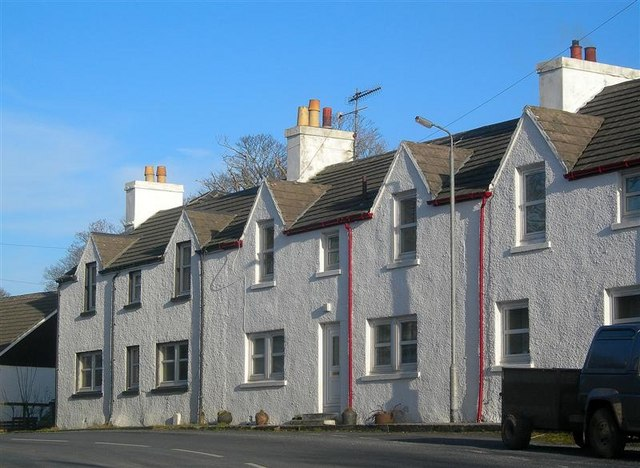
- Houses at the north side of Ballygrant

- Location within Argyll and Bute
- OS grid reference: NR395662
- Council area: Argyll and Bute
- Lieutenancy area: Argyll and Bute
- Country: Scotland
- Sovereign state: United Kingdom
- Post town: ISLE OF ISLAY
- Postcode district: PA45
- Dialling code: 01496
- Police: Scotland
- Fire: Scottish
- Ambulance: Scottish
- UK Parliament: Argyll, Bute and South Lochaber
- Scottish Parliament: Argyll and Bute

Ballygrant (Scottish Gaelic: Baile a' Ghràna) is a small village on the Inner Hebrides island of Islay of the western coast of Scotland. The village is within the parish of Killarow and Kilmeny.

Ballygrant (Baile a' Ghràna) is the longest established village on Islay, pre-dating the clearance and distillery villages on the coast, and nearby place names suggest connections to Viking age Scotland.

In the early 1870s, Kirkman Finlay, the new owner of the Dunlossit Estate pulled down the old thatched huts and built new cottages for his tenants which he let at nominal rents. He also re-opened the Lead Mines in the village under the superintendence of Mr Vircoe, a cornish mining engineer.

Ballygrant means 'the town of the grain' and the water-powered mill, now demolished, was turning oats into meal until the early 20th century. Later the water wheel powered a sawmill until electricity took over in the late 1960s.The oldest part of the village, where Craigard House stands, is at the junction of the A846 road, connecting Port Askaig and Port Ellen, and the Glen road.
