= Sound of Iona =

Sound between the Inner Hebridean islands of Mull and Iona

- Caol Ì (Scottish Gaelic)
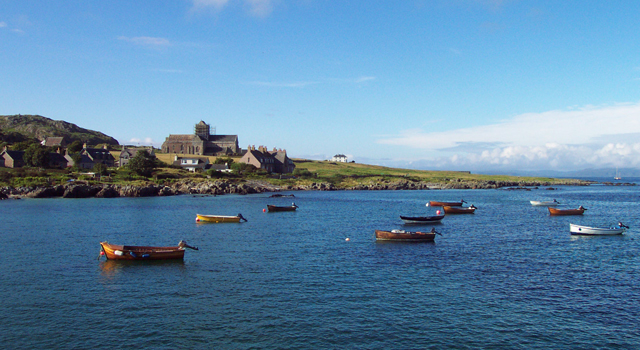
- Sound of Iona from Baile Mòr
- Interactive map of Sound of Iona
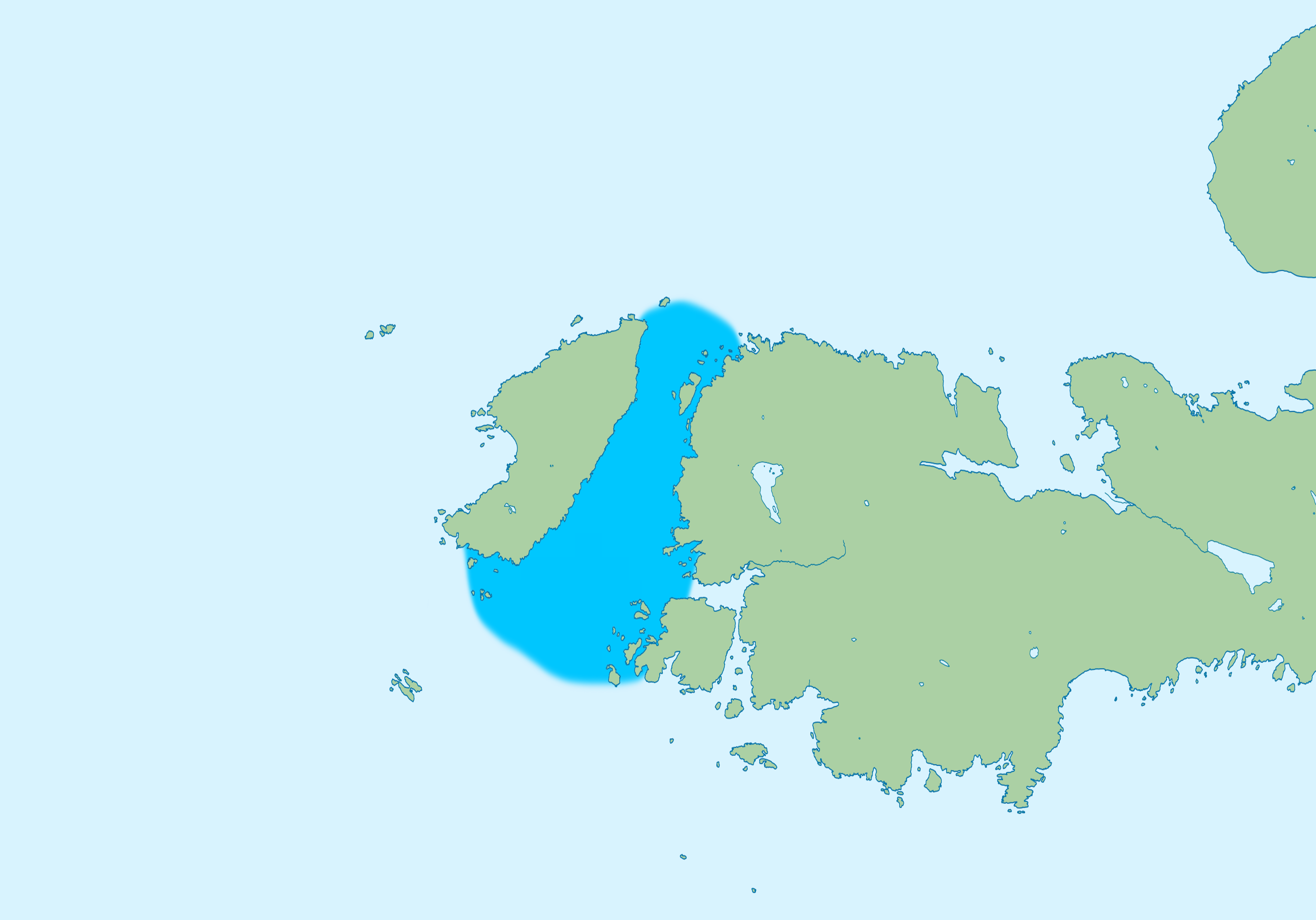
- Map of the Sound of Iona
- Location: Firth of Lorne–Loch na Keal (Atlantic Ocean)
- Coordinates: 56°19′18″N 6°23′6″W
- Type: Sound
- Basin countries: Scotland
- Min. width: 1.1 kilometres (0.68 mi)
- Average depth: 2 to 8 metres (6 ft 7 in to 26 ft 3 in)
- Max. depth: 23 metres (75 ft)
- Settlements: Baile Mòr, Fionnphort

The Sound of Iona is a sound between the Inner Hebridean islands of Mull and Iona in western Scotland. It forms part of the Atlantic Ocean.

The tidal island of Erraid is at the southern end of the sound. There are also a number of smaller islands and skerries in the sound, including Eilean nam Bàn, Eilean Dubh na Ciste and Eilean Ghòmhain.

The Sound of Iona is crossed by a passenger ferry, sailing from Fionnphort on Mull to Baile Mòr on Iona.
