= William Spence (architect) =

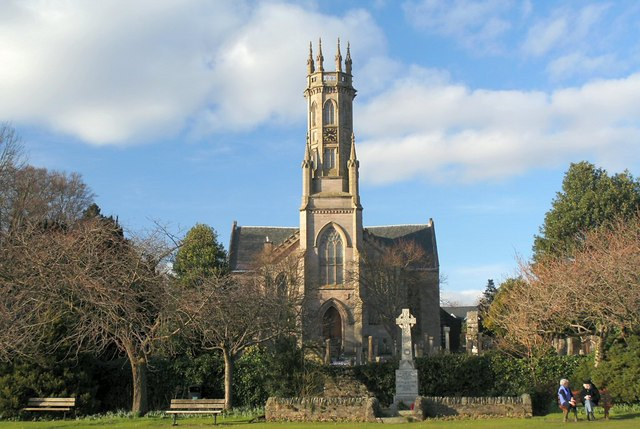
Rhu parish church, 1847

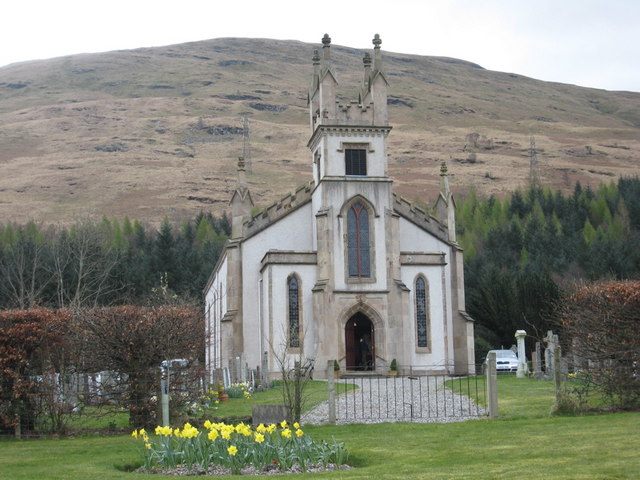
Arrochar Church, 1859-60

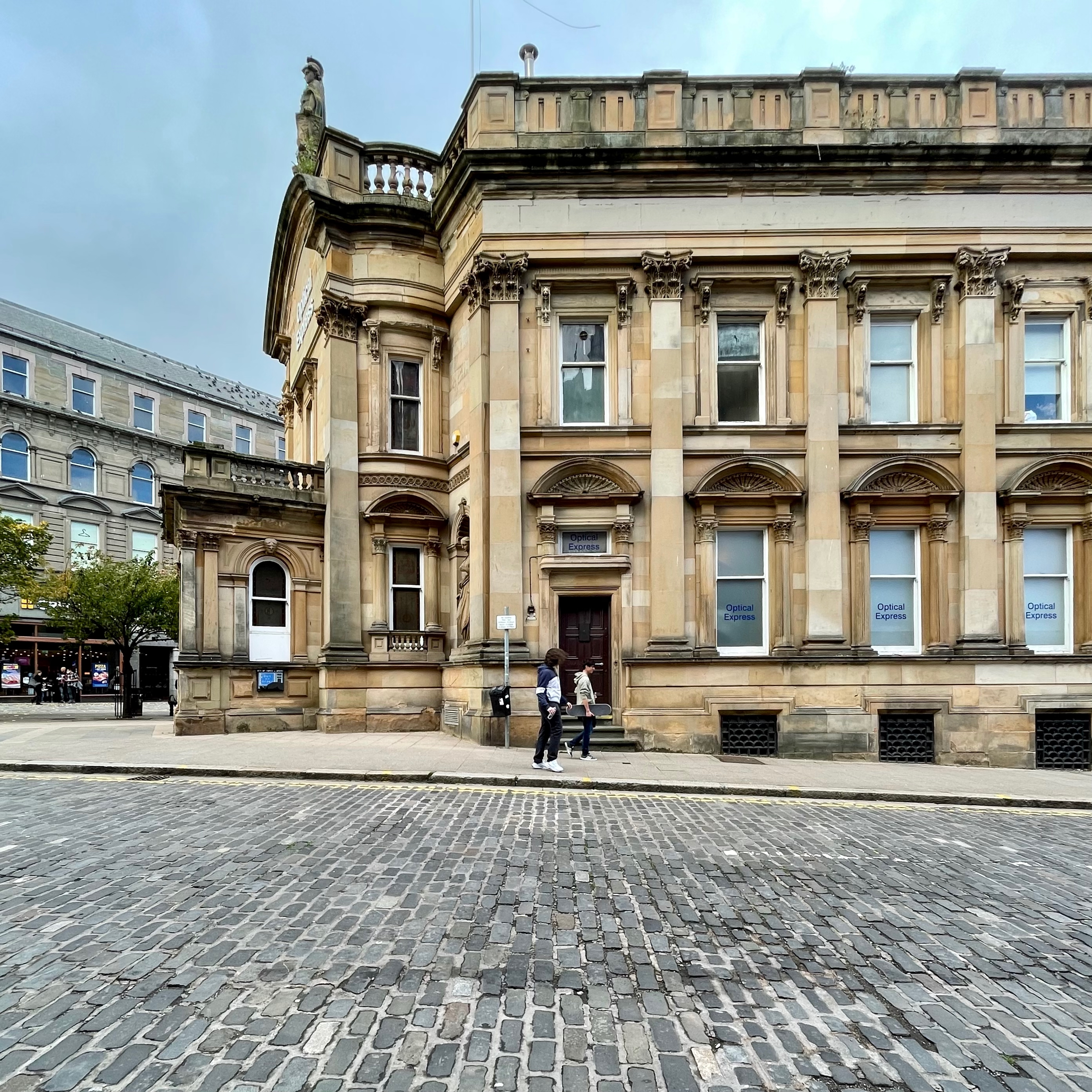
Clydesdale Bank, High Street, Dundee 1876

William Spence (1806 - 22 June 1883) was an architect based in Glasgow.

== Background ==
He was born in 1806 at Carstairs, the second son of John Spence (1775-1849) (shoemaker) and Margaret Kane (1778-1820). He married Margaret Field (1824-1879) on 12 December 1843 at Barony, Lanark and they had five children:

- Marion Spence (b. 1847)
- John William Spence (b. 1854)
- Henry Field Spence (b. 1856)
- Margaret B Spence (b. 1858)
- Jane Spence

He died on 22 June 1883 at Helensburgh, Argyll and Bute.

== Career ==
He trained in the offices of William Burn and David Bryce with John Bryce before establishing his own practice around 1837. Around 1839 he was based at 34 Glassford Street in Glasgow. By 1844 he had moved to 141 Buchanan Street, Glasgow, but by 1852 he was in business at 97 Union Street. In 1860 he settled at 52 Renfield Street, Glasgow.

In 1857 he was commissioned for a feuing plan to develop the upper areas of Helensburgh.

His wife Margaret died in 1879 and this may have prompted him to retire at the end of the same year. His son Henry continued the practice.

== Works ==
- Two houses, Springvale, Glasgow 1837
- Coulter Mains, Culter, Lanarkshire, 1838
- Theatre Royal, Dunlop Street, Glasgow 1839-40 (destroyed by fire in 1863, demolished 1879)
- Dalmarnock Gas Works, 122 Old Dalmarnock Road, Dalmarnock 1843
- The City Theatre, Glasgow Green 1844 (demolished 1845)
- United Secession Church (later the church hall for St Columba’s Church), King Street West, Helensburgh 1845
- Rhu Parish Church, 1847
- MacIntyre’s Corner, High Street, Glasgow ca. 1850 (demolished 1949)
- Chapelacre House, Helensburgh, Dunbartonshire 1850
- Paisley’s Warehouse, 72 Jamaica Street, Glasgow 1854-56 (demolished ca. 1989)
- Building at the junction of Cowcaddens Street and Hope Street, Glasgow 1855
- Gilford Castle, Gilford, County Down 1855
- Elmfield House, Gilford, County Down 1856
- Kinblethmont House, Arbroath, Angus 1856-59
- Peden Cross Building, Dumbarton Road and Elderslie Street, Cranstonhill, Glasgow 1856
- East Thorn Villa, New London Road, Toll Cross, Glasgow 1857
- House for himself, Helenburgh 1858
- Randolph & Elder’s Engineering Works, 13-23 Tradeston Street, Glasgow 1858 (demolished 1970)
- Arrochar Parish Church 1859-60
- Bridgend UP Church, West Bridgend, Dumbarton 1859-60 (replaced by a new church in 1886-88 and now used as the church hall)
- Pier and Esplanade, Helensburgh 1859
- St Columba’s Church, Sinclair Street, Helensburgh 1860
- Western Concert Hall, Greenock, Renfrewshire 1860
- Baillieston UP Church, Baillieston, Glasgow 1864
- Cameron House, Dunbartonshire/Stirlingshire, 1866-67 (rebuilding after a fire)
- Stewart & Macdonald’s Warehouse, 21-31 Buchanan Street and 8-28 Mitchell Street, Glasgow 1866 (also rebuilding and improvement in 1879)
- Fraser & McLaren’s warehouse, 115-120 Argyle Street, Glasgow 1867 (Rear building. Rebuilt after a fire in 1872)
- House, 1 East Montrose Street, Ardlui, Helensburgh, Dunbartonshire 1868 (latest)
- Prince of Wales Theatre, Cowcaddens Street and Stewart Street, Glasgow 1869 (rebuilding after a fire)
- Dunlossit House, Islay 1871-1874
- Glasgow Storage Company Warehouse, 250 Wallace Street, Glasgow 1871-72
- John Tod & Co Warehouse, 1-3 Moir Street, Glasgow 1873
- Arthur & Fraser, 14 Buchanan Street, Glasgow 1873
- Clydesdale Bank, 94-96 High Street and 52-54 Commercial Street, Dundee 1876
- Polytechnic Department Store, Jamaica Street, Glasgow 1876
- Tenement for Thomas Sharp, East Princes Street, Helensburgh 1877
- Villa for John Jack, Montrose Street, Helensburgh 1877
- Hermitage School, East Argyle Street, Helensburgh 1879-80 (all demolished 1977 except the Janitor’s House)
- Rockmount, 108 Sinclair Street, Helensburgh 1879
