= Gruline =

Coordinates: 56.4851°N 5.9916°W

Gruline: Scottish Gaelic: Grùilinn
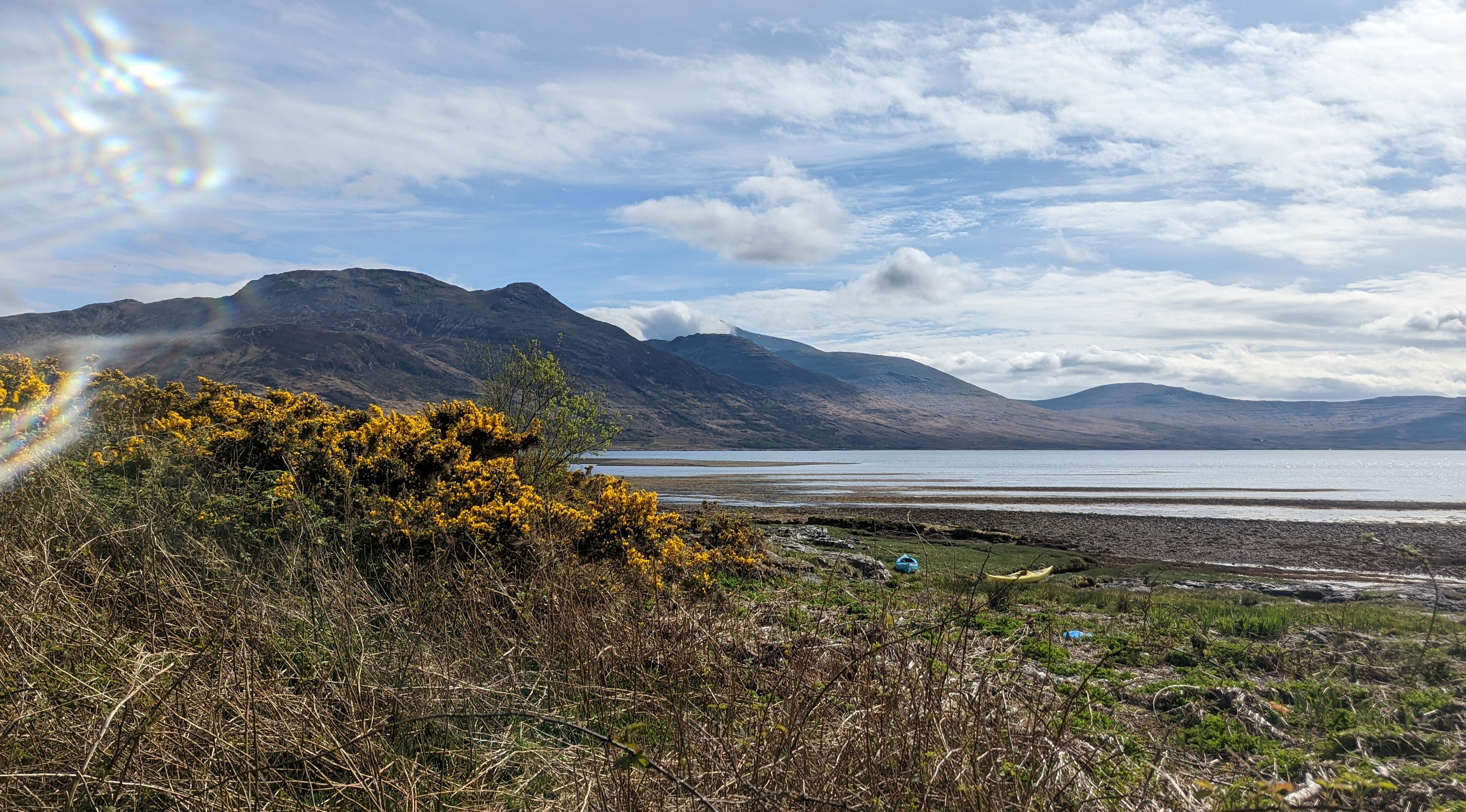
- Ben More from Killiechronan Campsite

- Location within Argyll and Bute
- OS grid reference: NM544400
- Community council: Mull
- Council area: Argyll and Bute
- Lieutenancy area: Argyll and Bute
- Country: Scotland
- Sovereign state: United Kingdom
- Post town: ISLE OF MULL
- Postcode district: PA64 6
- Dialling code: 01680
- Police: Scotland
- Fire: Scottish
- Ambulance: Scottish
- UK Parliament: Argyll, Bute and South Lochaber
- Scottish Parliament: Argyll and Bute

Gruline (Scottish Gaelic: Grùilinn) is a small settlement on the Isle of Mull, in Argyll and Bute, off the west coast of Scotland. The hamlet is located west of Salen on the other side of a 2 mile wide isthmus where the B8073 and B8035 converge at the head of Loch na Keal.

The settlement is contiguous with the neighbouring settlements of Knock and Killiechronan. The settlement sits between the two large estates of Gruline estate and Benmore estate.

The settlement borders Loch Bà and sits under Ben More and the other mountains of central Mull.

== Etymology ==
The English name Gruline comes from the Gaelic name Grùilinn, which means "stony land".
