= Aros Castle =

Castle in Argyll and Bute, Scotland

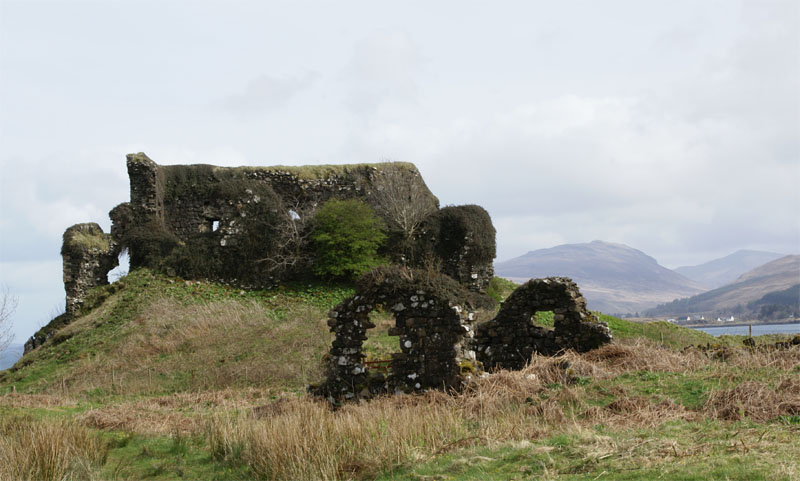
- Aros Castle ruins

Location
- Location on Mull
- Coordinates: 56.5321°N 5.9649°W

Site history
- Built: 13th century
- Built by: Clan MacDougall

Scheduled monument
- Official name: Aros Castle
- Type: Secular: bailey; castle; domestic buildings; hall; settlement, including deserted and depopulated and townships
- Designated: 26 March 1991
- Reference no.: SM5064

Aros Castle, also known as Dounarwyse Castle, is a ruined 13th-century castle near Salen on the Isle of Mull, Scotland. The castle overlooks the Sound of Mull.

== History ==
The castle was probably built by one of the MacDougall lords of Lorn in the 13th century. Documentary evidence from the late 14th century records it as Dounarwyse Castle in the possession of the Lords of the Isles. The castle was initially a stronghold of the Clan MacDougall. When they backed the losing side in the dispute between Edward I and Robert de Bruys, their lands were declared forfeit and the castle was given by King Robert to Angus Og of Islay Lord of the Isles and Clan Donald.

During the late 14th and 15th centuries, it was used as an occasional base by the Lords of the Isles, at which time it was known as Dounarwyse Castle. When, some centuries later, the latter tried to conquer Scotland, they too had their lands declared forfeit, and this time Clan Maclean gained the Castle at MacDonald expense.

Lord Ochiltree entertained the Island Chiefs here in 1608 before making them prisoners. It was described as 'ruinous, old, useless and never of any strength' in 1688 but seems to have been garrisoned by Argyll's troops in 1690. No evidence exists of any occupation in the 18th century or later.

== Status ==
It is a scheduled monument that includes the 13th-century hall-house and bailey with traces of other buildings, possibly of a later date, and a small stone-built galley landing east of the bailey.
