= Tiroran =

Hamlet on the Isle of Mull, Scotland

Coordinates: 56.376°N 6.084°W

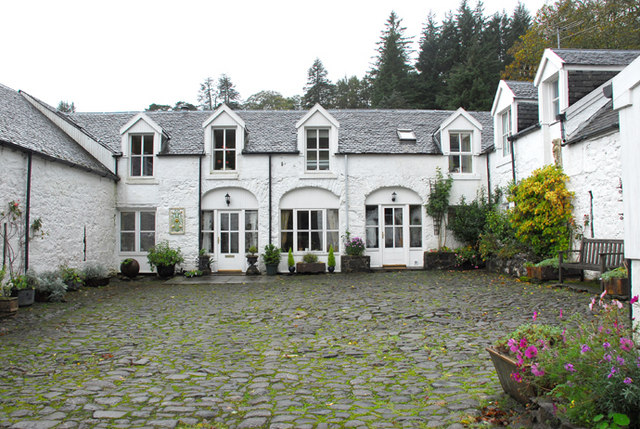
- The Steadings, Tiroran

- Location within Argyll and Bute
- Council area: Argyll and Bute
- Lieutenancy area: Argyll and Bute
- Country: Scotland
- Sovereign state: United Kingdom
- Post town: ISLE OF MULL
- Postcode district: PA69
- Dialling code: 01681
- Police: Scotland
- Fire: Scottish
- Ambulance: Scottish
- UK Parliament: Argyll, Bute and South Lochaber
- Scottish Parliament: Argyll and Bute

Tiroran is hamlet on the Isle of Mull in Argyll and Bute, Scotland.

== History ==
In the late 18th century Tiroran House was associated with the McKinnon family. Several family members are documented to have lived in the area and then served in the war with America in 1775. In Victorian times, the Tiroran Estate was owned by Maude Cheape (known as the Squire of Bentley) but was sold several times over. In the late 20th century Sue and Robin Blockey purchased the main house and turned it into a hotel, purchased again in 1997 by Colin and Jane Tindal and then subsequently bought by Laurence and Katie Mackay (2004) who ran a 3 AA restaurant and opened up a cafe and distillery producing the first gin on Mull, Whitetail Gin from the only distillery to be opened in over 200 years (Whitetail Gin) and other products from its copper still. The hotel has been purchased by the Kilfinichen Estate and is not currently open to hotel guests - historical archives and ancestry documents can be checked and searched through the local Museum called Pennyghael in the Past Historical Archive which is located within Tiroran.

== Geography ==
The hamlet of Tiroran lies on the South West side of the Isle of Mull on the northern shores of Loch Scridain, just off the B8035 road. The immediate surrounding area is dominated by the fertile Victorian woodland gardens and forests of Tiroran House as well as the large community owned Tiroran Forest, There is a river, or burn known as Alt Orian which runs through Tiroran and down to an original Victorian trout pond and waterfall within the Tiroran Estate grounds. The Seilisdeir (or the Kilfinichen River) is nearby and approximately 3 1/2 miles (5.5 kilometres) in length, both rivers enter the north shores of Loch Scridain at Kilfinichen Bay. Salmon are caught on the river and permits are available from the Pennyghael Post Office. To the northeast is Ben More.

== Tiroran House ==
Tiroran House, a country house hotel and holiday properties, lies within 60 acres (25 hectares) of gardens and grounds and is also home to Whitetail Gin produced by the Mackay family who have owned Tiroran House since 2004. The main house, formerly a Victorian hunting lodge owned by the Squire of Bentley (Maude Cheape) is set in manicured gardens, with woodland and glen walks that lead down to the private shores of Loch Scridain - Tiroran is now a small, exclusive estate and has been in the Mackay/Munro family since 2004. From this small estate the family run various business interests including accommodation and a distillery.
