= Achleck =

Coordinates: 56.52°N 06.21°W

- Location within Argyll and Bute
- OS grid reference: NM4145
- Council area: Argyll and Bute
- Country: Scotland
- Sovereign state: United Kingdom
- Police: Scotland
- Fire: Scottish
- Ambulance: Scottish
- UK Parliament: Argyll, Bute and South Lochaber
- Scottish Parliament: Argyll and Bute

Achleck is a small settlement in the north-west of the Isle of Mull in Argyll and Bute, Scotland.
