= Ardalanish =

Coordinates: 56.29°N 06.25°W

- Location within Argyll and Bute
- OS grid reference: NM3719
- Council area: Argyll and Bute
- Country: Scotland
- Sovereign state: United Kingdom
- Police: Scotland
- Fire: Scottish
- Ambulance: Scottish
- UK Parliament: Argyll, Bute and South Lochaber
- Scottish Parliament: Argyll and Bute

Ardalanish (Scottish Gaelic: Àird Dealanais) is a village on the Isle of Mull in Argyll and Bute, Scotland. It is now an organic farm and weaving mill, Ardalanish, Isle of Mull Weavers. The farm raises both Highland Cattle and Hebridean Sheep. The Mill weaves cloth using British native breed wool, from scarves and blankets to tweed. The site boasts a beautiful beach, and a farm trail and welcomes visitors to the mill and shop. There is also a small, family-run hotel in the area (Ardachy House).

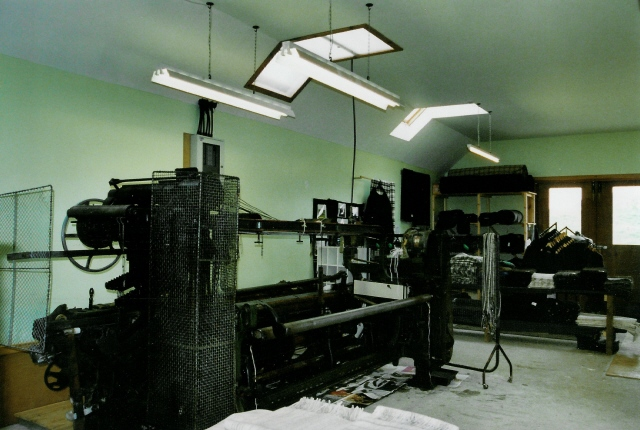
Workshop of Isle of Mull Weavers at Ardlanish

.
