= Dunlossit House =

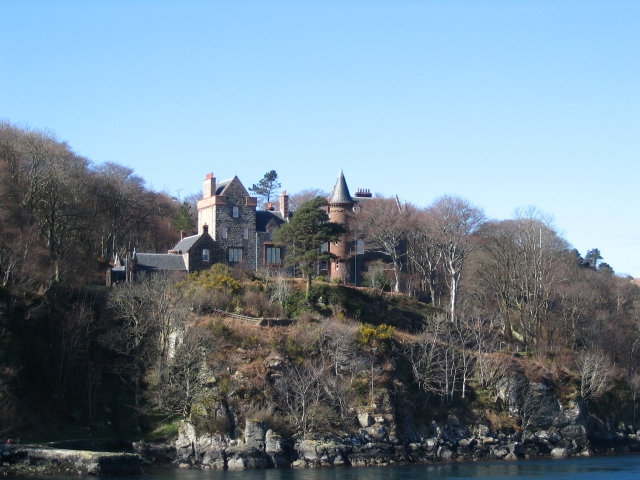
- Dunlossit House from the ferry arriving into Port Askaig
- Interactive map of the Dunlossit House area
- Former names: Glenlossit House

General information
- Location: Port Askaig, Islay, Scotland
- Coordinates: 55°50′46″N 6°6′18″W

Website
- www.dunlossitestate.com/estate/about-the-estate

Listed Building – Category C(S)
- Designated: 28 August 1980
- Reference no.: LB12160

Dunlossit House is a Category C listed country house near Port Askaig, Islay in the county of Argyll, in western Scotland..

== History and architecture ==
The house, originally known as Glenlossit House, was a shooting lodge which was rebuilt as a larger residence for Kirkman Finlay, a partner in Finlay, Thompson and Company. Kirkman Finlay purchased the estate from Sir Smith Child, 1st Baronet in 1869 and began to develop the estate by planting trees on a large scale. Construction work on the extensive rebuild started in 1871 and took until 1874. The architect was William Spence, the clerk of works was William Henderson and the foreman joiner was Robert Girdwood.

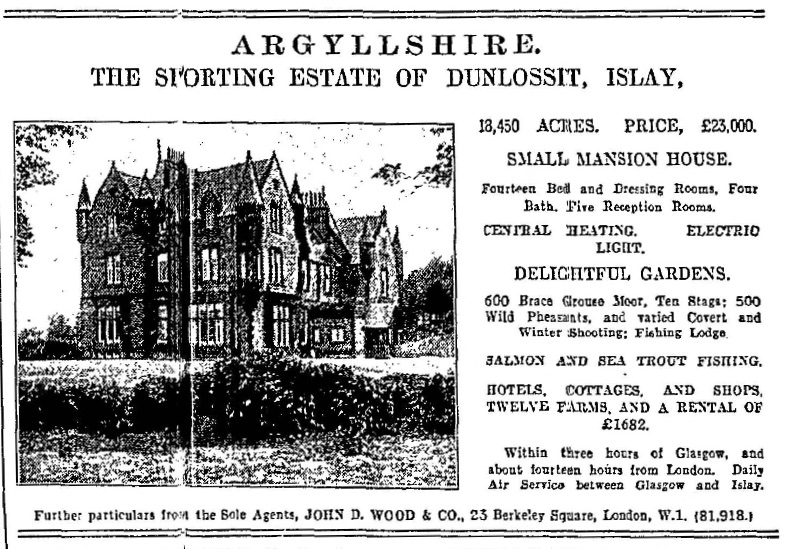
Advertisement from The Scotsman 27 June 1936

In 1890 it was purchased by Donald Turner Martin of Kintour for £66,000 (equivalent to £7,330,000 in 2025) and was rebuilt in 1909 following a fire.

In 1912 it was purchased by William Albert Bankier. His wife Esther Finlay Methuen Bankier died on 20 June 1915 at Dunlossit and after the First World War he decided to sell it. It was purchased by Nathaniel Dunlop in 1920 who owned it until his death in 1931.

The house and estate was advertised with an asking price of £23,000 (equivalent to £1,410,000 in 2025) and purchased in 1937 by Helmut Schroder and following his death, his son Bruno Schroder owned it. It remains in the family today. The estate currently comprises around 18,500 acres of land.
