= Salen, Mull =

Coordinates: 56.517°N 5.948°W

Salen: Scottish Gaelic: An t-Sàilean
- Village
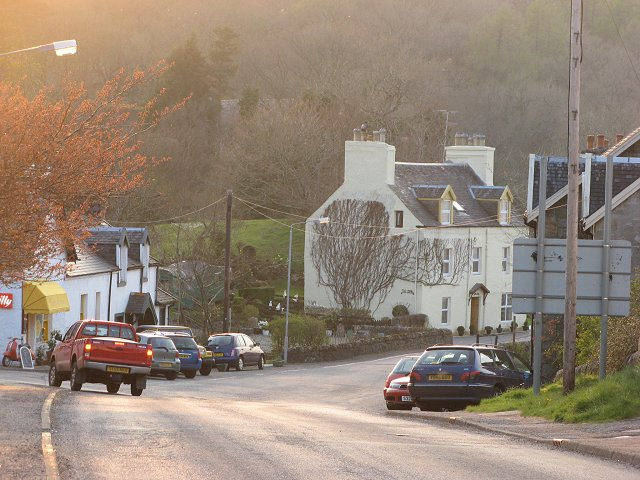
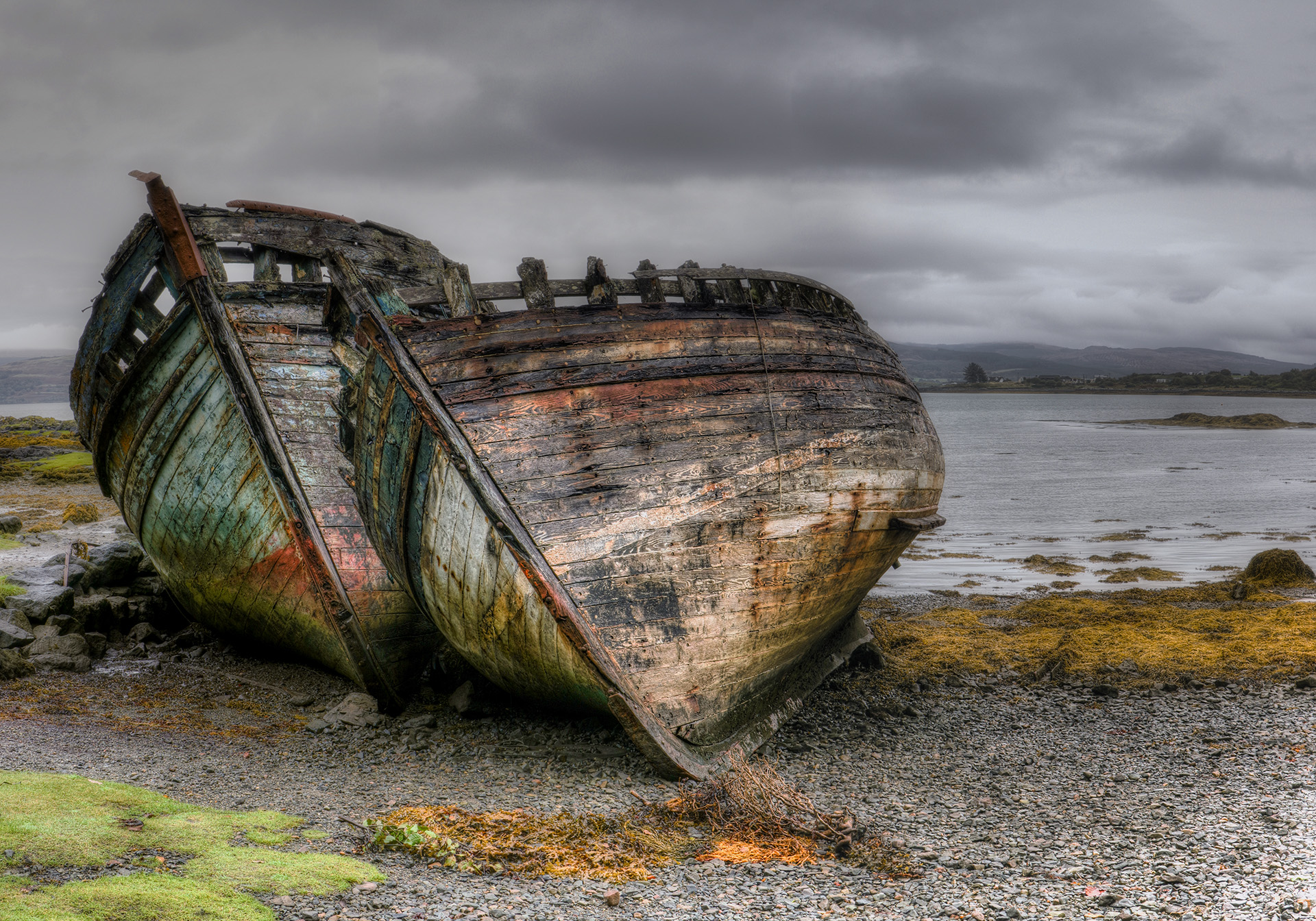
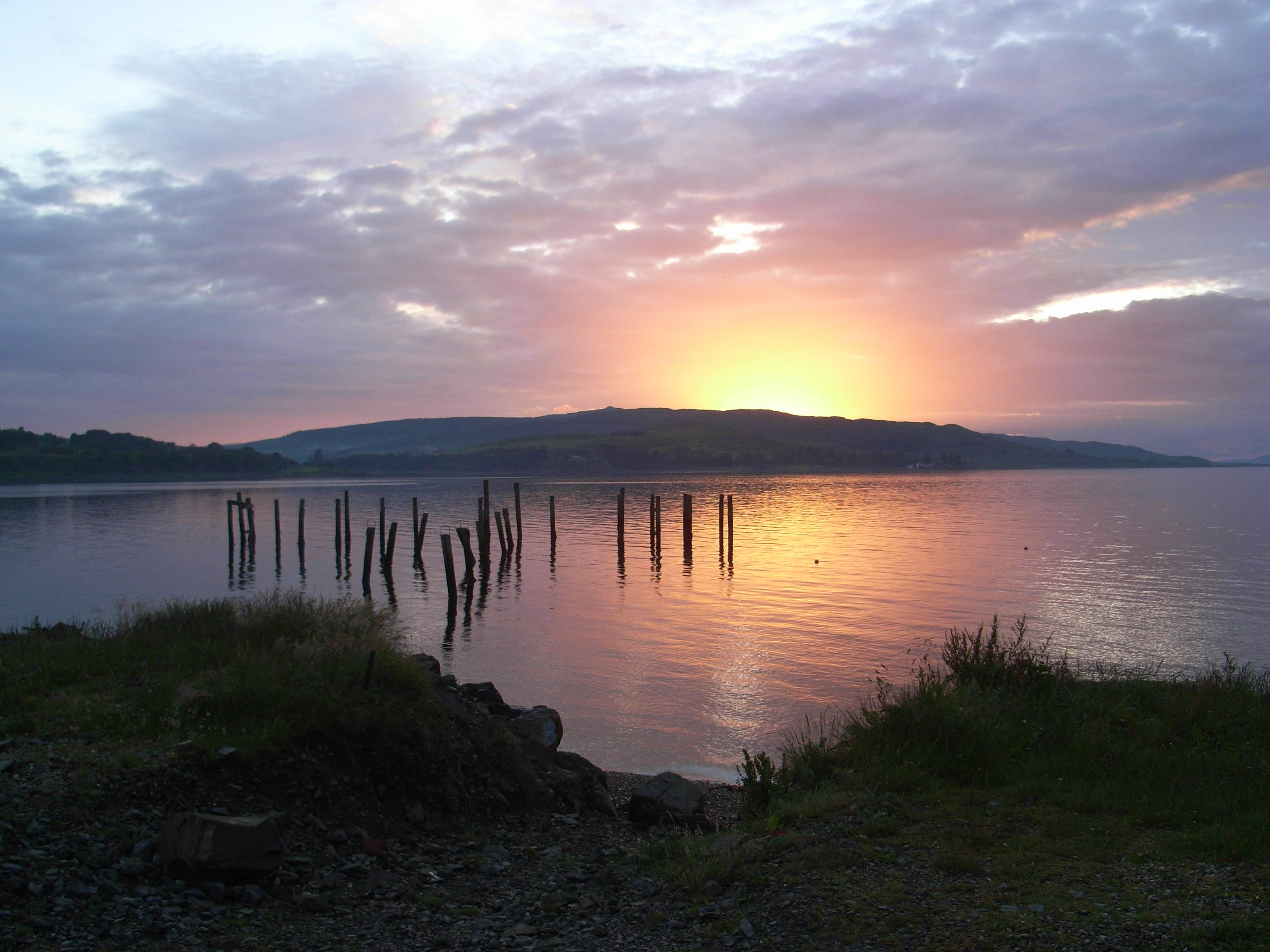
- Looking down the main street The Salen wrecks The old pier

- Location within Argyll and Bute
- Population: (1991)
- OS grid reference: NM5743
- Council area: Argyll and Bute
- Lieutenancy area: Argyll and Bute
- Country: Scotland
- Sovereign state: United Kingdom
- Post town: ISLE OF MULL
- Postcode district: PA72
- Dialling code: 01680
- Police: Scotland
- Fire: Scottish
- Ambulance: Scottish
- UK Parliament: Argyll, Bute and South Lochaber
- Scottish Parliament: Argyll and Bute

Salen (Note: Scottish Gaelic: An t-Sàilean) is a village on the Isle of Mull, Scotland. It is on the east coast of the island, on the Sound of Mull, approximately halfway between Craignure and Tobermory at the narrowest part of the island. The full name of the settlement is 'Sàilean Dubh Chaluim Chille' (the little black bay of St Columba). In 1991 it had a population of 500.

== History ==
Until the early 1800s, the site of today's village was no more than an unremarkable junction of tracks. The Laird of Gruline and Ulva, Lachlan Macquarie, decided that there was commercial advantage in establishing a village and harbour on the nearest point on the Sound of Mull to his estates: and so Salen came into being.

St Columba visited Salen and preached from a rocky bluff behind what became the Salen Hotel.

North across Salen Bay sits the ruins of the 13th century Aros Castle.

== Transport ==
The mailboat service from Oban to Mull formerly called at Salen pier en route to Tobermory. From 1964 the new ferries required bigger piers and Craignure was established as the main ferry terminus on the island due to its central location for visitors to Tobermory and Iona. This meant the end for Salen as a mailboat destination.

A minor road branches off here towards Gruline and various places on the west side of Mull.

The psychiatrist Angus MacNiven FRSE (1900-1984) is buried in Salen churchyard.
