= Little Colonsay =

Uninhabited island west of the island of the Isle of Mull in Scotland

Colbhasa Beag (Gaelic)

Location
- Little Colonsay next to Mull
- OS grid reference: NM375365
- Coordinates: 56.44737°N 6.26122°W

Name
- Name meaning: Old Norse for "Columba's island" or "Kolbein's island"
- Old Norse name: kolnøy

Physical geography
- Island group: Mull
- Area: 88 ha (5/16 sq mi)
- Area rank: 154
- Highest elevation: 61 m (200 ft)

Administration
- Council area: Argyll and Bute
- Country: Scotland
- Sovereign state: United Kingdom

Demographics
- Population: 0

Little Colonsay (Scottish Gaelic: Colbhasa Beag) is an uninhabited island west of the island of the Isle of Mull in Scotland. The geology of the island is columnar basalt, similar to that of neighbouring Staffa. It is part of the Loch Na Keal National Scenic Area, one of 40 in Scotland.

In 1841 the population was 16 individuals in two households, but by 1881 no population was recorded, the island having been cleared in 1846 by F. W. Clark, the notorious owner of Gometra and Ulva. The censuses of 1891 and 1931 recorded two inhabitants. In the early 20th century the island was farmed by John MacColum, known as "Johnny Colonsay", but he and his family were forced out by a plague of rats.

The island is owned by the family of Viscount Blakenham but has not been permanently inhabited since the 1940s. The 2nd Viscount's daughter, Cressida Cowell, the author of children's books including How to Train Your Dragon, spent childhood summers on the island and cites the Inner Hebrides as an inspiration for her books, suggesting they are "one of the most beautiful places on Earth" and "the kind of place where you expect to see dragons overhead".
