= Loch Tuath =

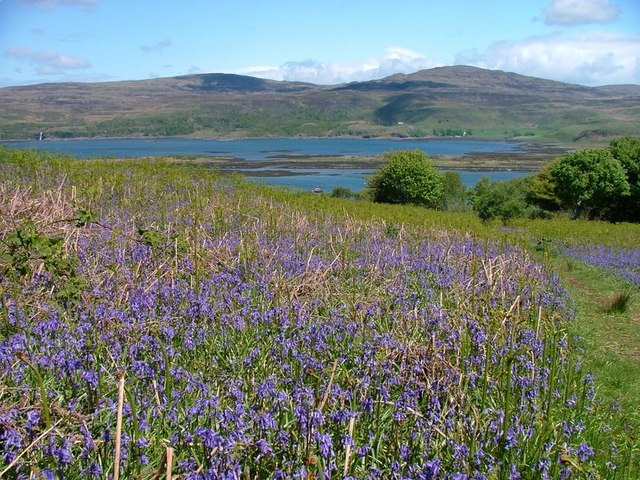
- Overlooking Loch Tuath at Ardalum, Ulva
- Interactive map of Loch Tuath
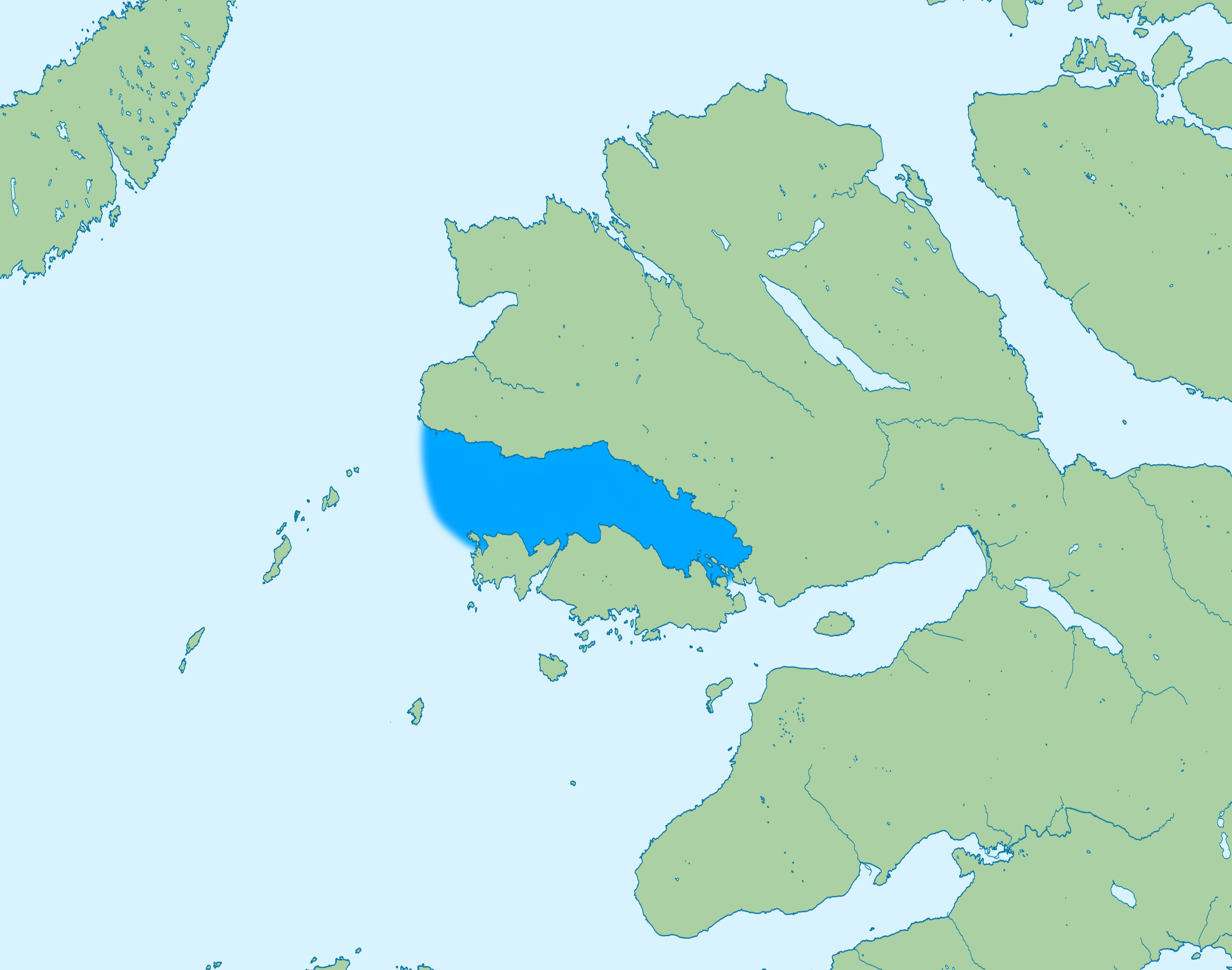
- Map of Loch Tuath
- Location: Isle of Mull, Scotland
- Coordinates: 56°30′25″N 6°13′00″W
- Basin countries: United Kingdom
- Settlements: Ulva Ferry

Loch Tuath (Note: Scottish Gaelic: Loch-a-Tuath) is a sea loch in the Inner Hebrides, Scotland that separates the Isle of Mull and the island of Ulva. Loch Tuath forms part of the Loch na Keal National Scenic Area, one of the forty national scenic areas in Scotland, which are defined so as to identify areas of exceptional scenery and to ensure its protection from inappropriate development.
