= Gometra =

Island in the Inner Hebrides of Scotland

Gòmastra (Gaelic)
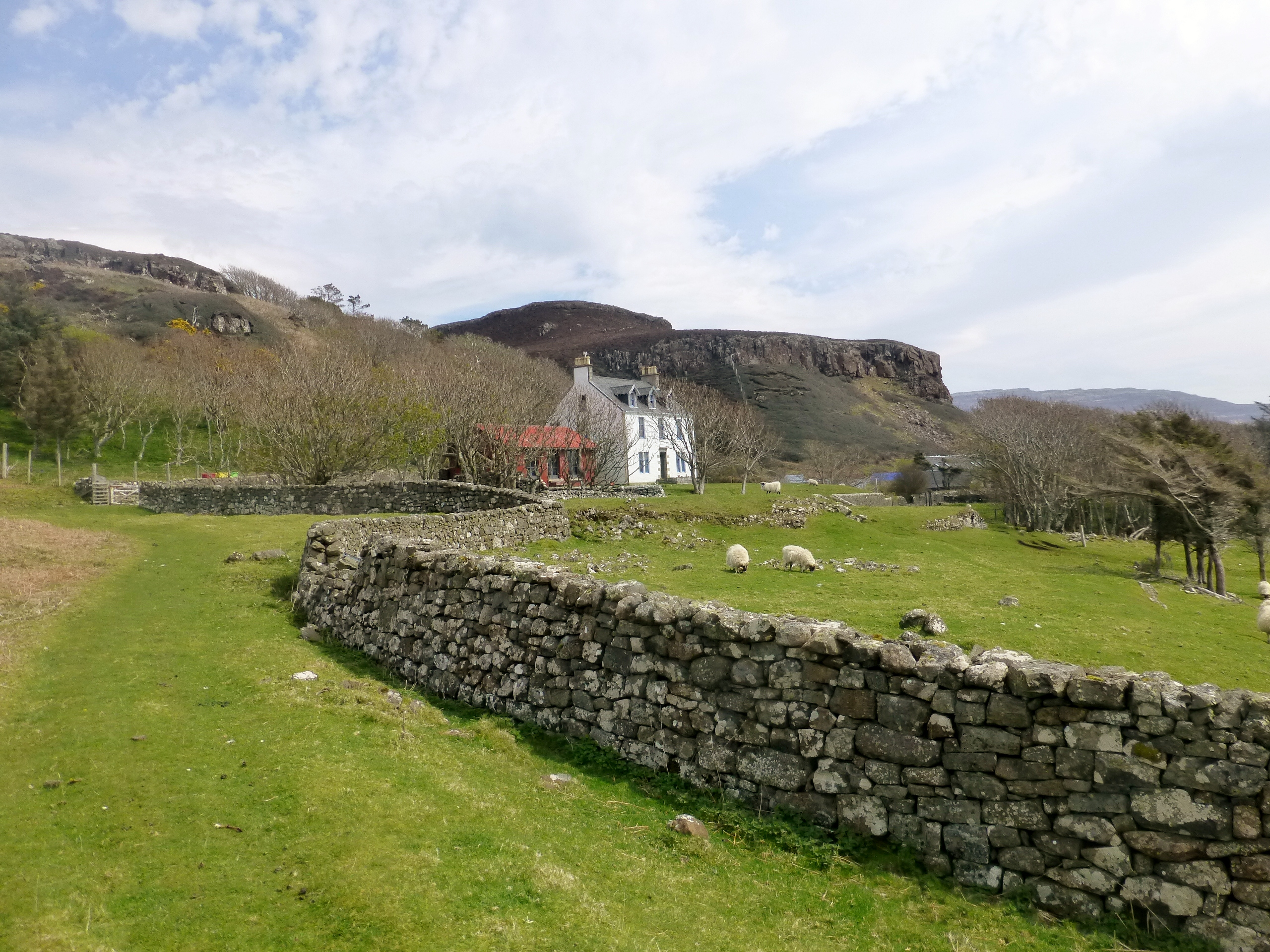
- Gometra House

Location
- Gometra shown next to Mull
- OS grid reference: NM361414
- Coordinates: 56.49°N 6.29°W

Name
- Gaelic pronunciation: [ˈkoːməs̪t̪ɾə]
- Name meaning: Possibly Good-man's island
- Old Norse name: Goðrmaðrey

Physical geography
- Island group: Mull
- Area: 425 ha (1 5/8 sq mi)
- Area rank: 75
- Highest elevation: 155 m (509 ft)

Administration
- Council area: Argyll and Bute
- Country: Scotland
- Sovereign state: United Kingdom

Demographics
- Population: 7
- Population rank: 72=
- Population density: 1.65/km^{2} (4.3/sq mi)

Gometra (Scottish Gaelic: Gòmastra) is an island in the Inner Hebrides of Scotland, lying west of Mull. It lies immediately west of Ulva, to which it is linked by a bridge, and at low tide also by a beach. It is approximately 425 hectares (1 5/8 square miles) in size. The name is also applied to the island summit, which is a Marilyn. The island has been owned since 1991 by Roc Sandford, a wealthy environmental campaigner who lives mostly in London and part of the year on Gometra.

Gometra

Highest point
- Elevation: 155 m (509 ft)
- Prominence: 155 m (509 ft)
- Listing: Marilyn

Geography
- Location: Off the coast of Mull, Scotland
- Topo map: OS Landrangers 47, 48

== Etymology ==
According to Gillies (1906), Gometra is from the Norse gottr + madr + ey and means "The good-man's island" or "God-man's island". Mac an Tàilleir (2003) offers "Godmund's island". The Norse Goðrmaðray may also mean "warrior priest's island". The Gaelic Gu mòr traigh meaning "only at low tide" has been proposed as the meaning of the name, but may be an example of folk etymology. Mediaeval charters render the name "Gomedrach".

== Geology ==
Like much of nearby Mull and Ulva, Gometra is formed almost entirely from basalt lavas erupted during the early Palaeogene period. A couple of dykes are mapped cutting, and hence younger than, the basalt. In common with other such igneous intrusions assigned to the 'Mull Swarm', they are aligned northwest–southeast. Pipe-amygdales are present in some locations.

== Geography ==
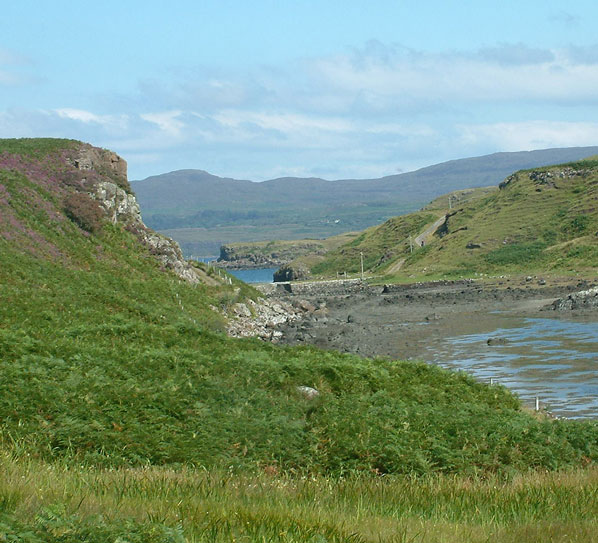
Bridge connecting Gometra on left to Ulva on right

The island is agricultural, formerly growing grain for the Iona Abbey. Once home to a population of over a hundred, it is now down to a tight-knit community of a handful of people, up to a thousand blackface sheep, highland cattle, pigs, horses, a flock of feral goats, and red deer. Historical sites on the island include settlements, a burial ground, and the remains of two duns. It has no ferry. One of the few services it does have is a weekly postal service; Gometra issues its own local carriage stamps.

The island is part of the Loch Na Keal National Scenic Area, one of 40 in Scotland.

== History ==
The island became part of the Kingdom of the Isles, during the Norse era. Whereas nearby Ulva and Staffa belonged to the MacQuarries from the 10th century, Gometra became a possession of the Iona monastery prior to passing into the hands of the Duke of Argyll. Dean Monro makes no mention of Gometra or Ulva in his 1549 work A Description of the Western Isles of Scotland but both are referred to briefly by John Monipennie c. 1612, stating of the latter that "about 300 paces from this island, lyeth Gomatra, two miles long and one mile broad".

In 1821 Ulva was sold by the trustees of the MacDonalds of Staffa to Lt-General Charles MacQuarrie, brother of General Lachlan Macquarie, the so-called father of Australia. After his death it was bought in 1835 by Francis William Clark of Ulva, a lawyer from Stirling, of Morayshire origin who began a brutal clearance of a substantial proportion of the inhabitants of Ulva within a few years. However the MacDonalds of Staffa retained Gometra until 1858 when it was sold to Donald MacLean, who built Gometra House.

== Current ownership ==
In 1932, the island was sold to the English mountaineer Hugh Ruttledge (1884–1961), who had taken early retirement from the Indian Civil Service and planned a life as a farmer. While living on the island, Ruttledge led two British expeditions to Mount Everest, in 1933 and 1936, and took up sailing. In 1950, he moved to Dartmoor.

Gometra House had fallen into disrepair and parts were near collapse by the 1980s, but was reoccupied and restored as a family home in the 1990s. Millionaire and environmental campaigner Roc Sandford owns the island, which he bought in 1991. He lives “off grid” on Gometra for one third of the year and lives in London the rest of the time. The inhabitants of Gometra House, Roc and two of his young adult children, were profiled in Stacey Dooley Sleeps Over. The episode, entitled "Eco Warriors", deals with their commitment to Extinction Rebellion and the realities of living on a remote, unserviced island.

In 2012, concerns were expressed by islanders about the siting of a large fish farm by the Scottish Salmon Company in Loch Tuath to the north of the island.

== Transport ==
Weather and tides permitting, it takes about 1 hour and 15 minutes to travel by track from the houses on the west of Gometra to the ferry landing stage on Ulva for the crossing to Mull, using a 4×4 vehicle. The same trip can be done in 50 minutes on a quad bike. By boat from Acarseid Mhòr the journey only takes 20 minutes.

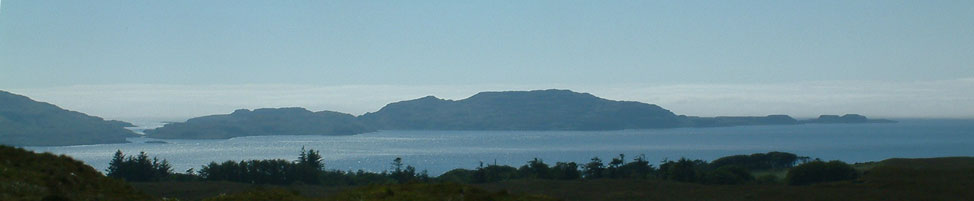
The north coast of Gometra from Mull

== See also ==
- List of islands of Scotland
