= Samalan Island =

Coordinates: 56°27′6″N 6°8′7″W

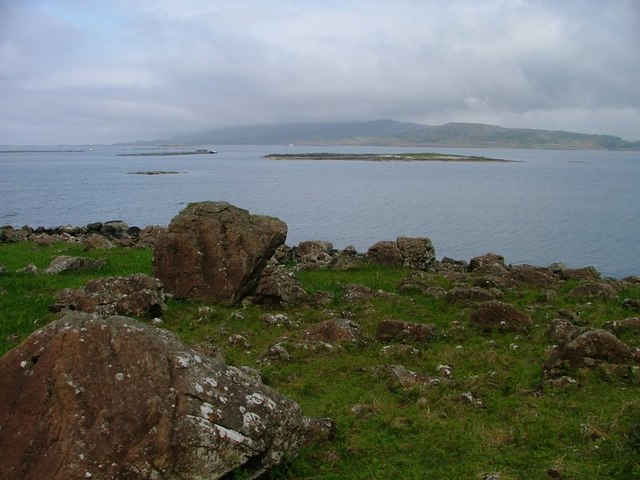
Samalan Island. In the foreground can be seen fishing pontoons, and in the background, the island of Ulva

Samalan Island is a small island, just off the Isle of Mull at the mouth of Loch na Keal in the Inner Hebrides, Scotland. To its south west is the island of Inchkenneth, and to its north, the island of Ulva.

It is a low-lying island, and does not rise above 5 metres (16 ft) at its highest point. It is uninhabited, and shows no signs of permanent inhabitation.
