= Staffa =

Island of the Inner Hebrides in Argyll and Bute, Scotland

Stafa (Gaelic)
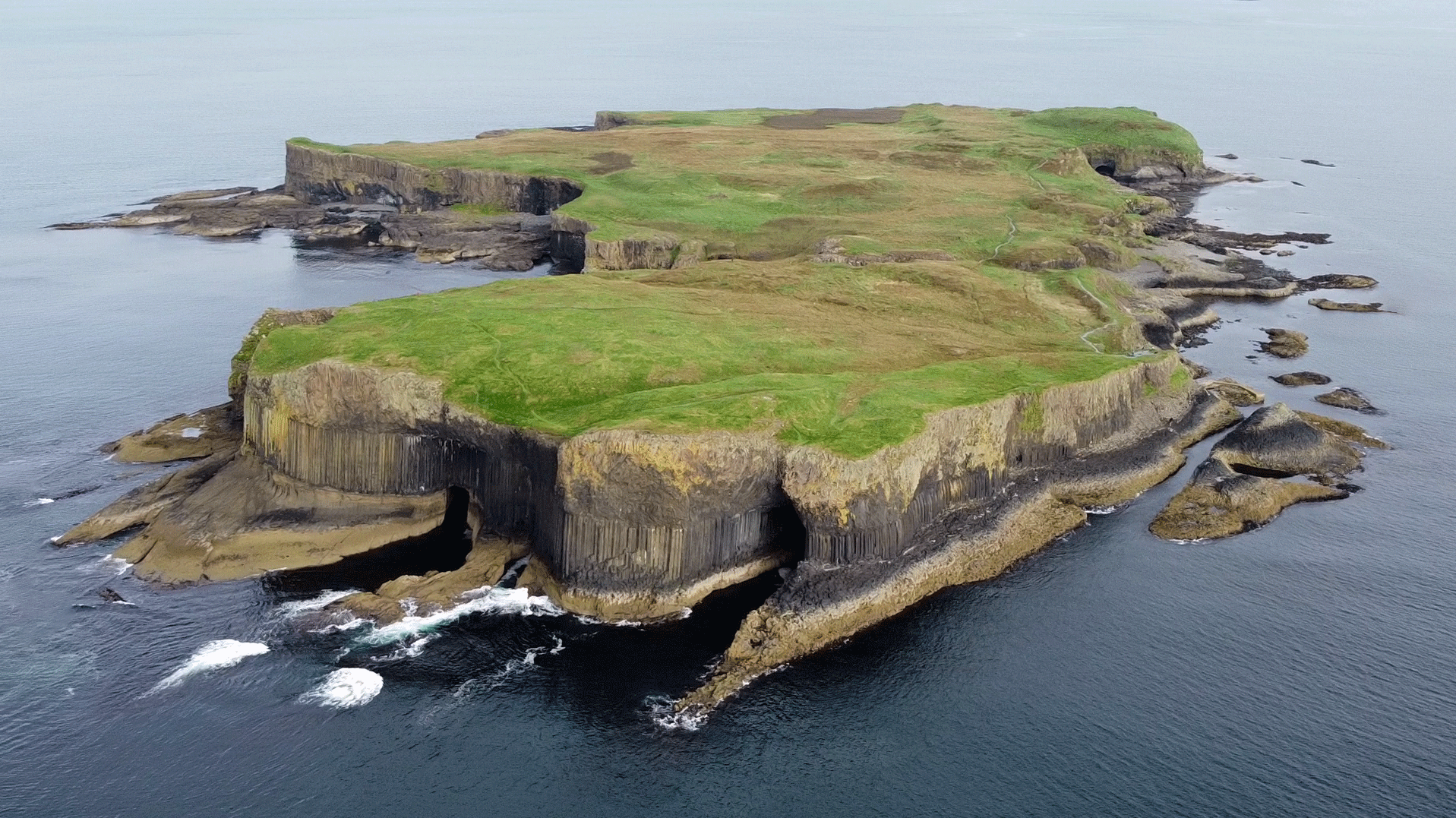
- Aerial view of Staffa, with The Colonnade in the foreground and Am Buchaille to the right

Location
- Staffa shown relative to Mull
- OS grid reference: NM323355
- Coordinates: 56.43°N 6.33°W

Name
- Name meaning: Old Norse for "stave" or "pillar".
- Old Norse name: stafi-oy

Physical geography
- Island group: Mull
- Area: 33 ha (1/8 sq mi)
- Area rank: 0
- Highest elevation: 42 m (138 ft)

Administration
- Council area: Argyll and Bute
- Country: Scotland
- Sovereign state: United Kingdom

Demographics
- Population: Uninhabited since 1800

Staffa (Scottish Gaelic: Stafa, pronounced [ˈs̪t̪afa], from the Old Norse word for a stave or pillar) is an island of the Inner Hebrides in Argyll and Bute, Scotland. The Vikings gave it the name because its columnar basalt reminded them of their houses, which were constructed using vertical logs.

Staffa lies about 10 kilometres (6 miles) west of the Isle of Mull. It is 33 hectares (82 acres) in area and the highest point is 42 metres (138 feet) above sea level.

The island came to prominence in the late 18th century after a visit by Sir Joseph Banks. He and his fellow-travellers extolled the natural beauty of the basalt columns and of the island's main sea cavern, which Banks renamed "Fingal's Cave". Their visit was followed by those of many other prominent people during the next two centuries, including John Keats, Queen Victoria and Felix Mendelssohn. The latter's Hebrides Overture brought further fame to the island, which was by then uninhabited. It is now in the care of the National Trust for Scotland.

== Geology and pre-history ==
In prehistoric times (Pleistocene), Staffa was covered by the ice sheets which spread from Scotland out into the Atlantic Ocean beyond the Outer Hebrides. After the last retreat of the ice around 20,000 years ago, sea levels were up to 125 metres (410 ft) lower than at present. Although the isostatic rise of land makes estimating post-glacial coastlines a complex task, around 14,000 years ago it is likely that Staffa was part of a larger island, just off the coast of mainland Scotland, which would have included what are now Mull, Iona and the Treshnish Isles.

Steadily rising sea levels then further isolated this little island, which is entirely of volcanic origin. It consists of a basement of tuff, underneath colonnades of a black fine-grained Paleogene basalt, overlying which is a third layer of 'slaggy' basaltic lava entablature. By contrast, slow cooling of the second layer of basalt resulted in an extraordinary pattern of predominantly hexagonal columns that form the faces and walls of the principal caves. The lava contracted towards each of a series of equally spaced centres as it cooled and solidified into prismatic columns, a process known as columnar jointing. The columns typically have three to eight sides, six being most common. The columns are also divided horizontally by cross joints. These columnar jointed sections represent the tops and bottoms of individual lava flows. Between these sections lie regions of much more chaotic jointing, known as the entablature. The origin of the entablature is unknown, but could be due to flooding of the lava flow, causing much more rapid cooling, or the interaction of stress fields from the two regions of columnar jointing as they approach one another.

Similar formations are found at the Giant's Causeway in Northern Ireland, on the island of Ulva, and at Ardmeanach on the Isle of Mull. Grooves in the roof of MacKinnon's cave indicate either a pyroclastic flow or a series of eroded ash falls in the rock above the columnar basalt. The 'Staffa Group' is the name given to the series of olivine tholeiite basalts found in the vicinity of Mull, which erupted 55–58 million years ago.

== Geography ==
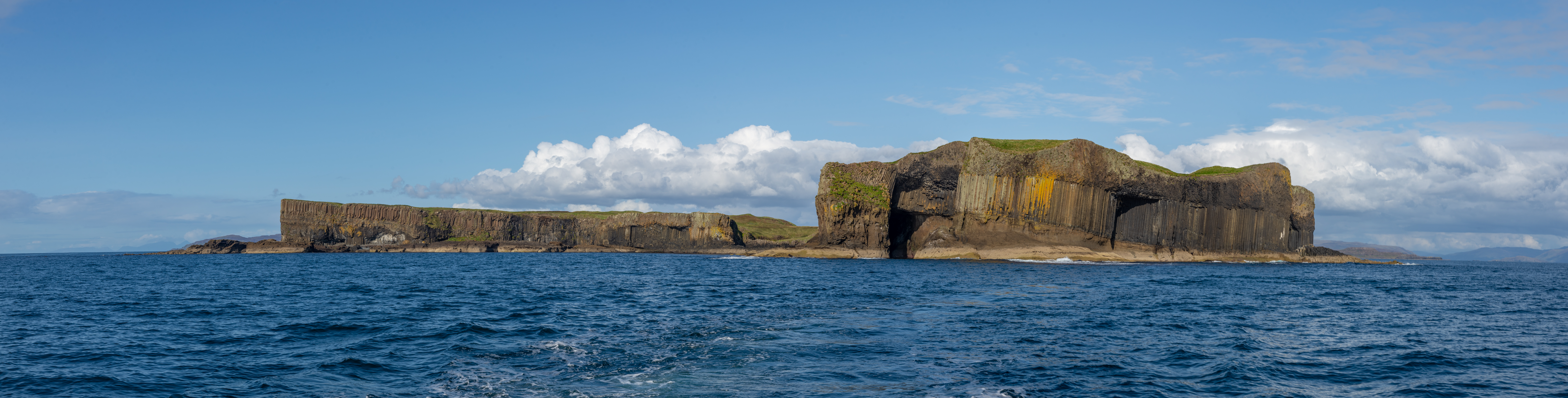
Isle of Staffa Panorama

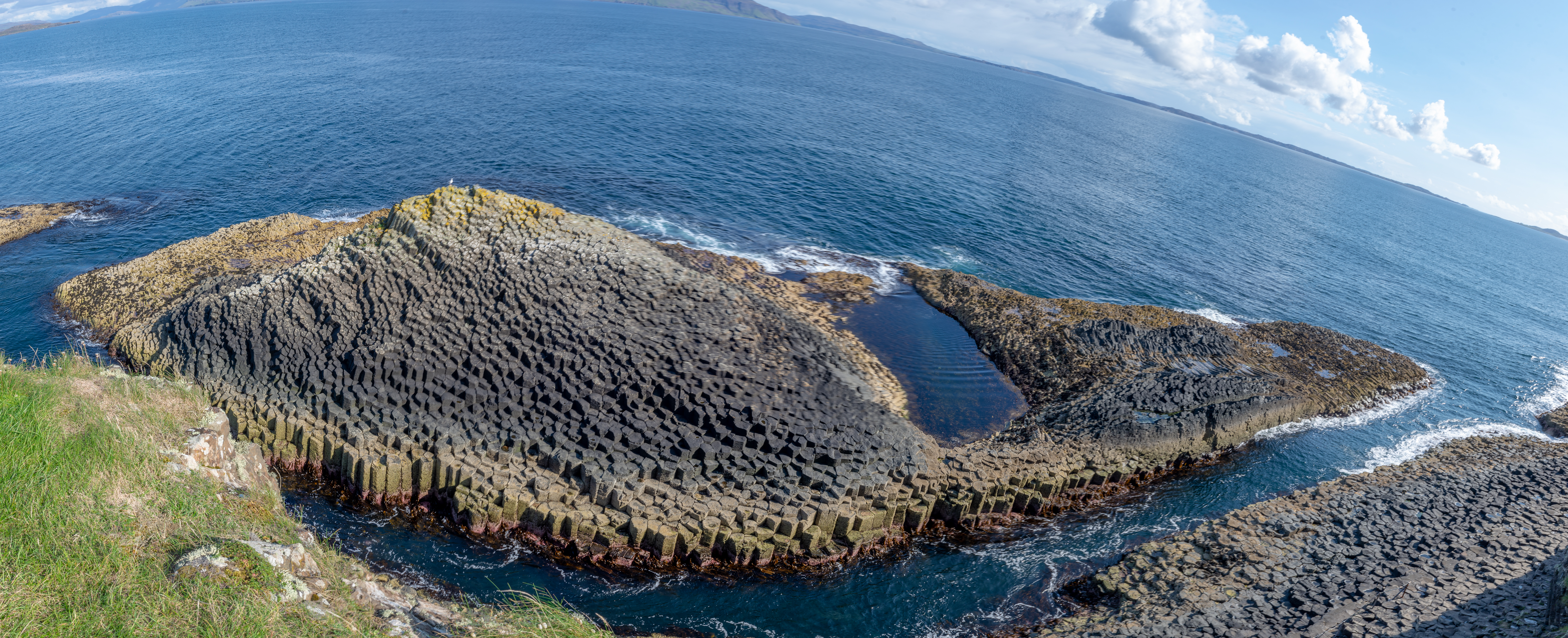
Am Buchaille

Staffa lies about 10 kilometres (6 mi) west of Mull, and 9 km northeast of Iona. It is longitudinally oriented north–south, and is a kilometre long by about half a kilometre wide. The circumference is about 3.8 km in extent. In the northeast, the isle shelves to a shore, but otherwise the coast is rugged and much indented; numerous caves have been carved out by rain, streams, and sea. There is enough grass to feed a few cattle, and the island has a spring.

On the east coast are Goat Cave and Clamshell Cave. The latter is 10 m high, about 6 m wide at the entrance, and some 45 m long, and on one side of it, the ridges of basalt stand out like the ribs of a ship. Near this cave is the pyramidal rock islet of Am Buachaille ('The Herdsman'), a pile of basalt columns seen fully only at low tide. Other outlying rocks include Eilean Dubh to the north-west and a series of skerries stretching for half a kilometre to the south-west. On the southwest shore are Boat Cave and Mackinnon's Cave (named after a 15th-century abbot of Iona), which has a tunnel connecting it to Cormorant Cave. These caves lie to the south-west and can be accessed from the bay of Port an Fhasgaidh at low tide. In 1945, a mine exploded near Boat Cave, causing damage to the cliff face, which is still visible. Mackinnon's Cave is 107 metres long.

Staffa's most famous feature is Fingal's Cave, a large sea cave located near the southern tip of the island, some 20 m high and 75 m long, formed in cliffs of hexagonal basalt columns. This cliff face is called the Colonnade or The Great Face and it was these cliffs and their caves that inspired Felix Mendelssohn's Die Hebriden (English: Hebrides Overture opus 26), which was premiered in London in 1832. The original Gaelic name for Fingal's Cave is An Uamh Bhin – "the melodious cave" – but it was subsequently renamed after the 3rd-century Irish warrior Fionn MacCool. Mendelssohn was nonetheless inspired by the sound of the waves in the cave and waxed lyrical about his visit, claiming that he arrived in Scotland "with a rake for folk-songs, an ear for the lovely, fragrant countryside, and a heart for the bare legs of the natives".

== History ==
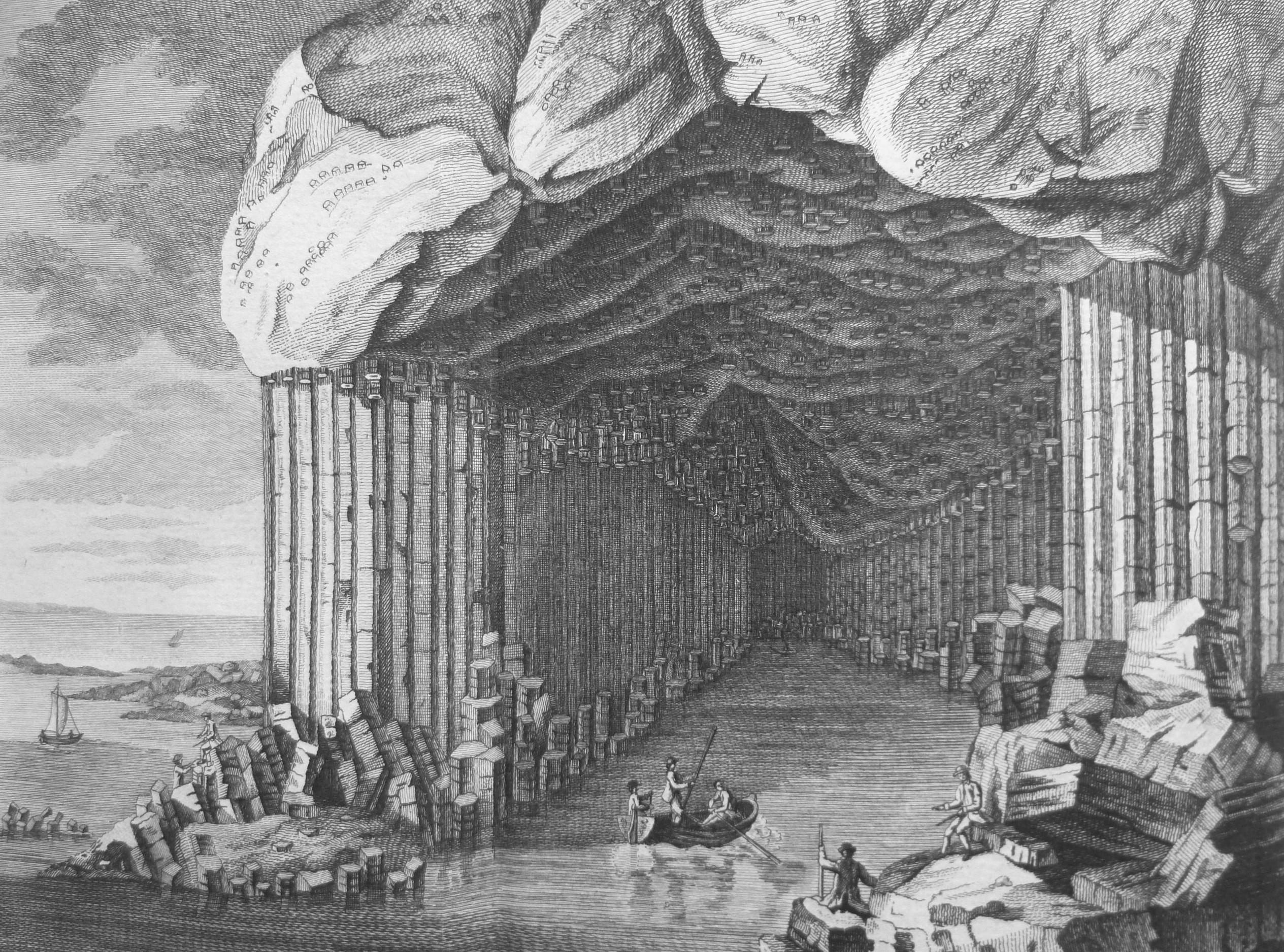
Engraving based on sketches made of Fingal's Cave by John Cleveley Jnr. published in 1772

=== 18th century ===
Little is known of the early history of Staffa, although the Swiss town of Stäfa on Lake Zurich was named after the island by a monk from nearby Iona. Part of the Ulva estate of the MacQuarries from an early date until 1777, it was brought to the English-speaking world's attention after a visit by Sir Joseph Banks in August 1772. En route to Iceland in the company of the painter Johann Zoffany, the Bishop of Linköping, and the Swedish naturalist Daniel Solander, Banks (later a president of the Royal Society) was entertained by Maclean of Drummen, on the Isle of Mull. Hearing about Staffa, he resolved to visit and set out from Tobermory the next day. The winds were light, and they did not arrive until darkness had fallen. Banks wrote:

It was too dark to see anything, so we carried our tent and baggage near the only house on the island, and began to cook our suppers, to be prepared for the earliest dawn, and to enjoy that which, from the conversation of the gentlemen we had, now raised the highest expectations of.

They were not disappointed. Despite becoming infested with lice during his short stay on the island, he provided glowing reports of his visit. He confessed that he was:

forced to acknowledge that this piece of architecture, formed by nature, far surpasses that of the Louvre, that of St. Peter at Rome, all that remains of Palmyra and Paestum, and all that the genius, the taste and the luxury of the Greeks were capable of inventing.

Samuel Johnson and his protege James Boswell visited clan MacQuarrie on Ulva in 1773, the year after Banks' visit. Perhaps aware that Banks considered that the columnar basalt cliff formations on Ulva called "The Castles" rivalled Staffa's Johnson wrote:

When the islanders were reproached with their ignorance or insensibility of the wonders of Staffa, they had not much to reply. They had indeed considered it little, because they had always seen it; and none but philosophers, nor they always, are struck with wonder otherwise than by novelty.

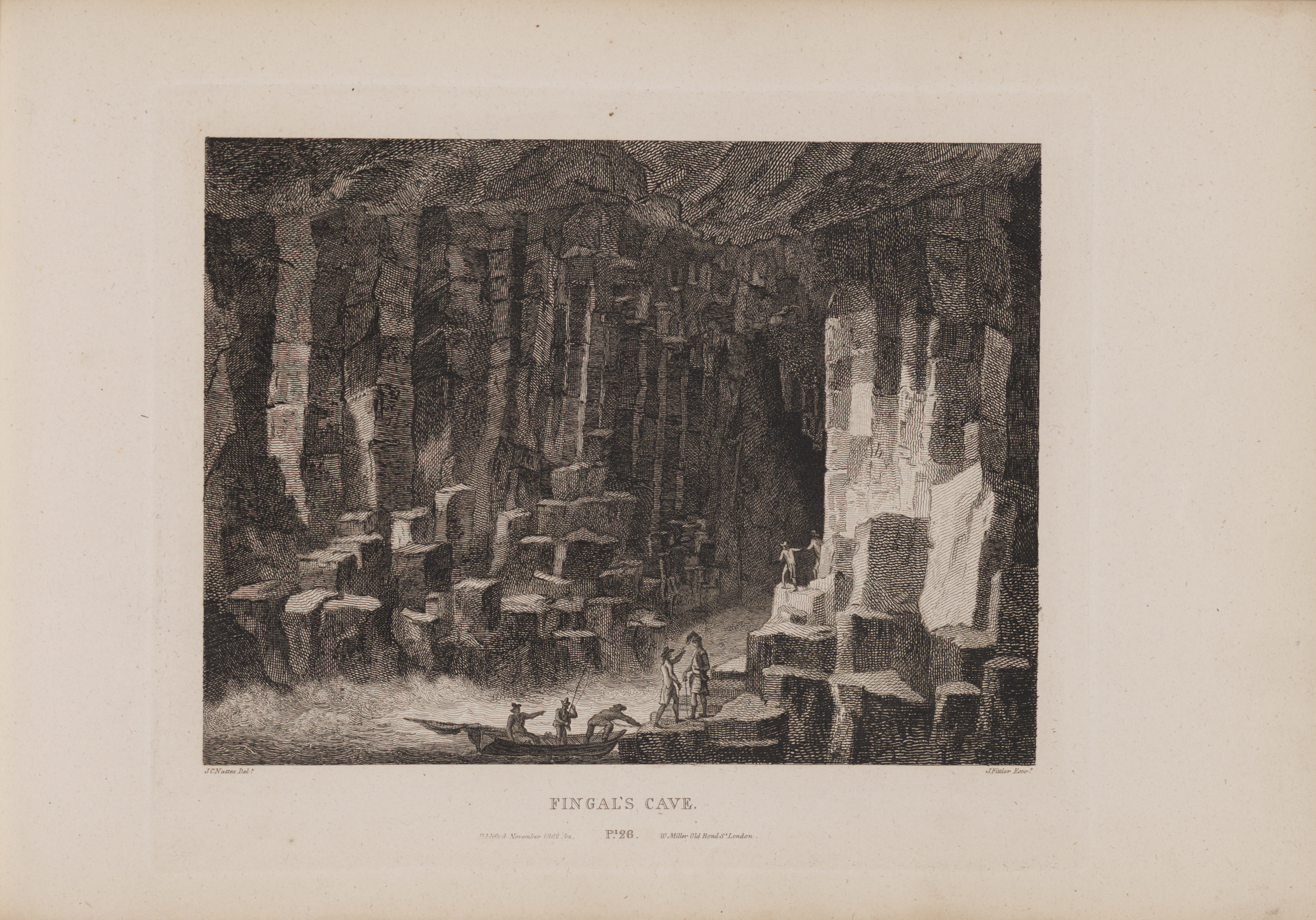
Engraving of Fingal's Cave by James Fittler in Scotia Depicta, 1804

Amongst the first eminent overseas visitors to Staffa were Barthélemy Faujas de Saint-Fond, a wealthy French zoologist and mineralogist, and the American architect and naturalist William Thornton. Visiting in 1784, they were suitably impressed, Faujus writing: "this superb monument of nature, which concerning its form bears so strong a resemblance to a work of art, though art can certainly claim no share in it."

=== 19th and 20th centuries ===
Subsequently, a stream of famous visitors came to view Staffa's wonders, including Robert Adam, Sir Walter Scott (1810), John Keats (1818), J. M. W. Turner, whose 1830 visit yielded an oil painting exhibited in 1832, William Wordsworth (1833), Jules Verne (1839), Alice Liddell (the inspiration for Alice in Wonderland) in 1878, David Livingstone (1864), Robert Louis Stevenson (1870) and Mendelssohn himself in 1829. Wordsworth, however, found the volume of tourism disappointing.

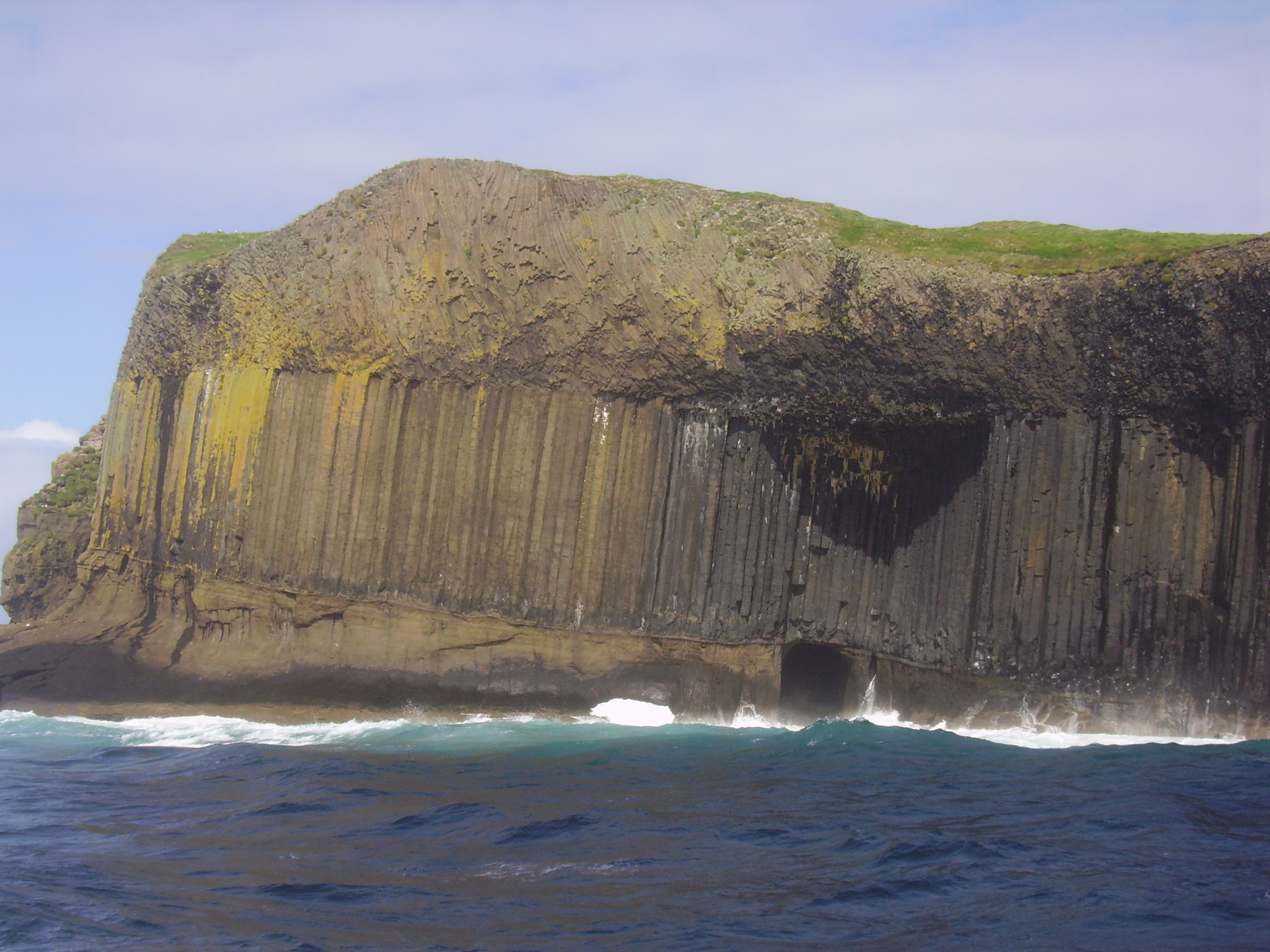
Boat Cave

We saw, but surely in the motley crowd

Not one of us has felt, the far-famed sight:
How could we feel it? Each the others blight,
Hurried and hurrying volatile and loud.

— William Wordsworth, Cave of Staffa. Poems Composed or Suggested During a Tour in the Summer of 1833. No 28.

Writing more than a century later, the writer W. H. Murray agreed, complaining that the visitors spoiled the "character and atmosphere", and suggesting that "to know Staffa one must go alone".

Others were more enthusiastic, despite the presence of numerous others. Queen Victoria and Prince Albert were rowed into the cave in the royal barge in 1847, and The Times correspondent recorded:

As the Royal Squadron cleared out of the Sound of Mull, and round the northern extremity of the island, a noble prospect lay before it, the steep and barren headlands of Ardnamurchan stretching away into the Atlantic on the right, on the left the precipitous cliffs of the Mull coast, and far away and embosomed in the ocean, the fantastic and varied forms of the adjacent islands. The horizon toward the north was a good deal obscured by haze, but, notwithstanding, Skye was distinctly visible... The deserted and solitary aspect of the island was brought out with a strange and startling effect by the presence of so many steamers; and as Her Majesty's barge with the Royal Standard floated into the cave, the crew dipping their oars with the greatest precision, nothing could be more animated and grand than the appearance which the vast basaltic entrance, so solemn in its proportions, presented.

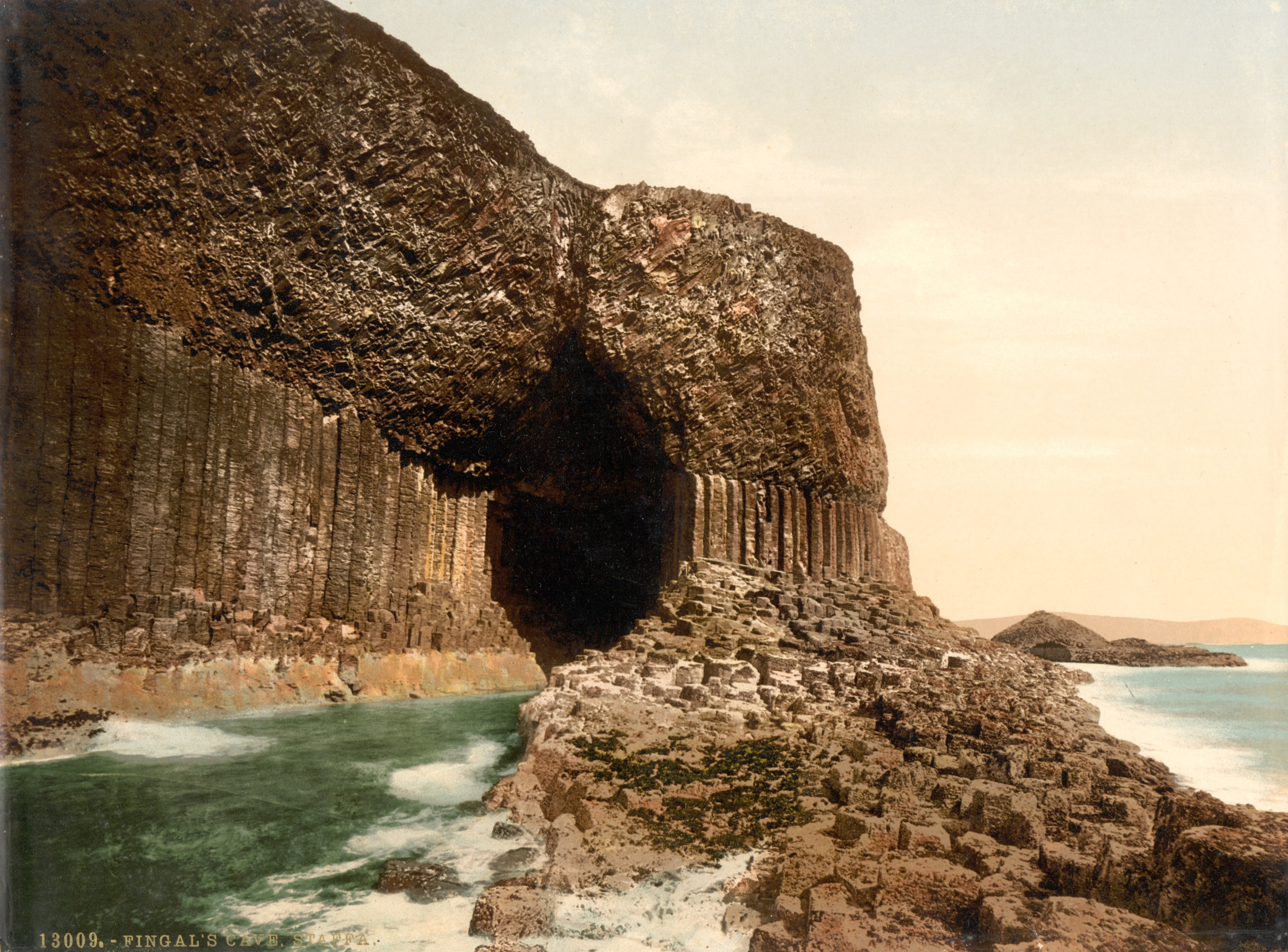
Fingal's Cave around 1900

Keats complained about the expense of the ferry, but was captivated by what he saw nonetheless. Displeased with his first efforts to describe this "cathedral of the sea", he finally settled on:

Not Aladdin magian/Ever such a work began, Not the wizard of the Dee, Ever such a dream could see; Not St John, in Patmos Isle, In the passion of his toil, When he saw the churches seven, Golden Aisl'd, built up in heaven, Gazed at such a rugged wonder. --John Keats, Staffa

=== Tenants and owners ===
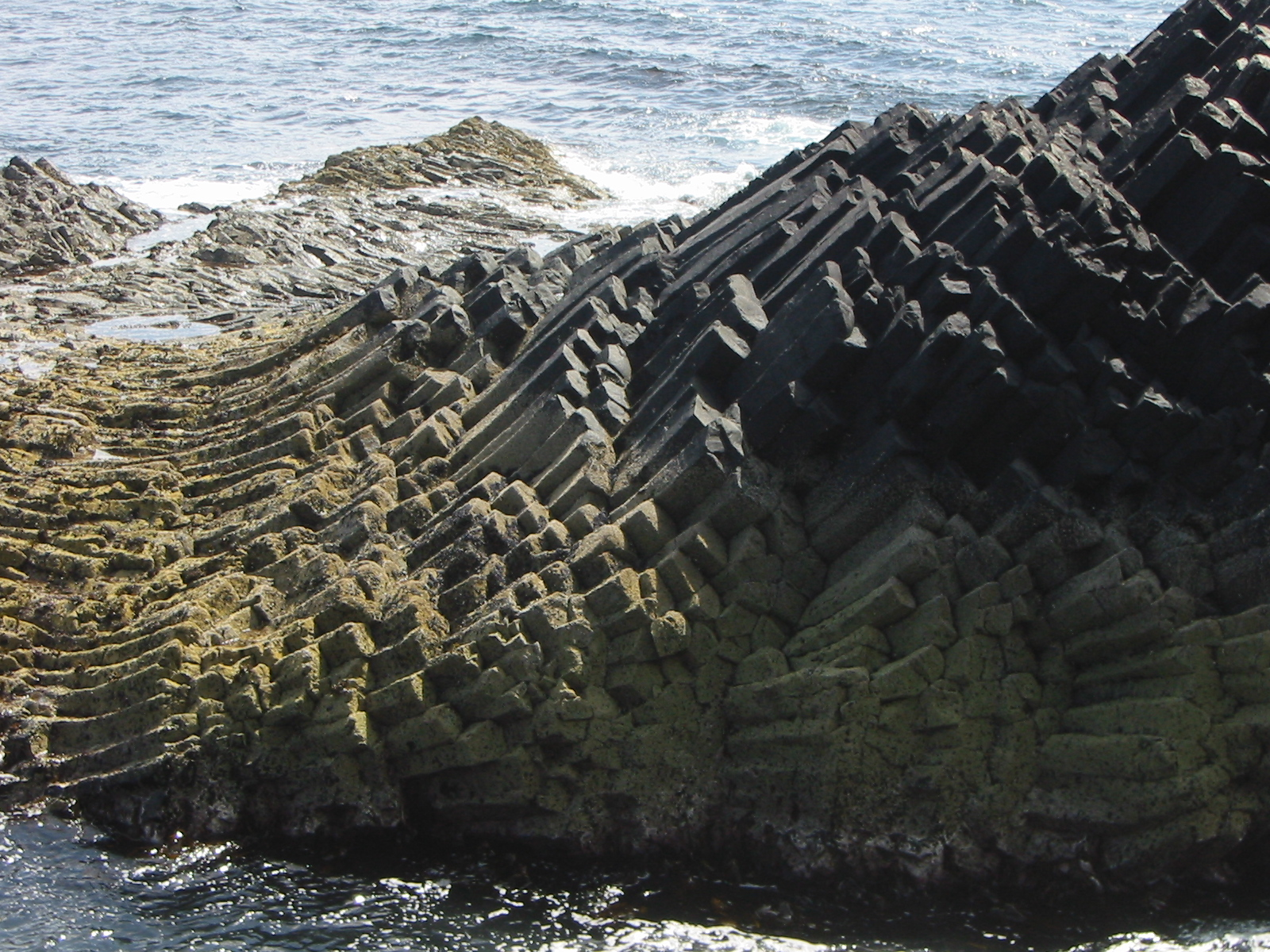
Basalt columns on Am Buchaille

However inspiring the scenery, it was not an easy place in which to live. In 1772, there was only a single family living on a diet of barley, oats, and potatoes, and whatever their grazing animals could provide, and growing flax. By the end of the 18th century, they had deserted Staffa, apparently terrified by the severity of winter storms. Signs of "rig and furrow" agriculture can still be seen on the island, but the only surviving building is the ruin of a 19th-century shelter for travellers.

By 1800, the island was under the ownership of Colin MacDonald of Lochboisdale. In 1816, his son Ranald MacDonald sold Staffa into the care of trustees. In 1821, these trustees sold the island to Alexander Forman as trustee, the purchase money being paid by his brother John Forman WS. It remained in the Forman family until sold by Bernard Gilpin Vincent "Pat" Forman in 1968. There were several private owners after that, including Alastair de Watteville, a descendant of Colin MacDonald who wrote a book about the island, until finally Jock Elliott Jr. of New York gifted it to the National Trust for Scotland in 1986 to honour the 60th birthday of his wife, Eleanor. A grateful National Trust bestowed upon her the honorific "Steward of Staffa". In a 2005 poll of Radio Times readers, Staffa was named as the eighth-greatest natural wonder in Britain.

During the 20th century, there were issues of bogus postage stamps bearing Staffa's name.

== Nature and conservation ==
Staffa National Nature Reserve
- IUCN category II (national park)
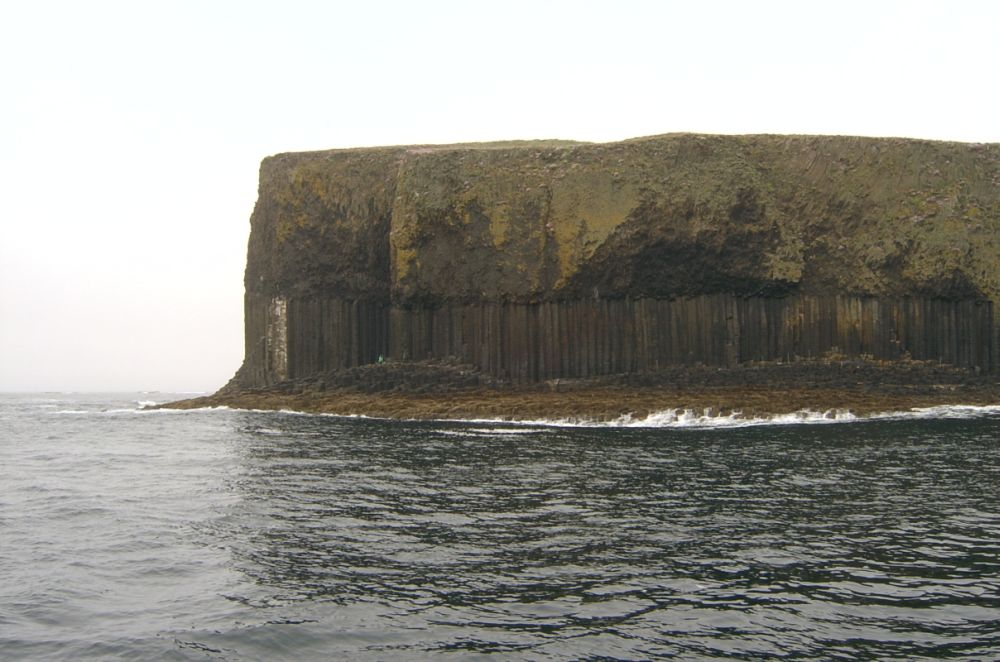
- Sea cliffs
- Interactive map of Staffa National Nature Reserve
- Location: Argyll and Bute, Scotland
- Area: 30.7 ha (76 acres)
- Designation: NatureScot
- Established: 2001
- Owner: National Trust for Scotland
- Website: Staffa National Nature Reserve

In 1800, there were three red deer on the island, later replaced by goats and then by a small herd of black cattle. Subsequently, the summer grazing was used for sheep by crofters from Iona, but in 1997 all livestock was removed. This has led to a regeneration of the island's vegetation. The island supports a diverse range of plants, with species such as common heather, kidney vetch, common-bird's-foot trefoil, wild thyme, and tormentil all found. The clifftop grassland supports species such as red fescue, yorkshire fog, thrift, sea campion, sea plantain and ribwort plantain.

Staffa is nationally important for breeding fulmars, common shags, and puffins, and great skuas and gulls also nest on the island. The surrounding waters provide a livelihood for numerous seabirds, grey seals, dolphins, basking sharks, minke, and pilot whales.

The island has been designated as a national nature reserve since 2001. The national nature reserve is classified as a Category II protected area by the International Union for Conservation of Nature. Staffa is also a Site of Special Scientific Interest (SSSI), whilst the seas surrounding the island are designated as a Special Area of Conservation (SAC) due to the presence of harbour porpoises. Staffa is part of the Loch Na Keal National Scenic Area, one of 40 in Scotland.

== Visiting Staffa ==
Boat trips from Tiree, Tobermory, Oban, Ulva Ferry, and Fionnphort on Mull, and Iona run from April to September, allowing visitors to view the caves and the puffins that nest on the island between April and early August. There is a landing place used by the tourist boats just north of Am Buachaille, but disembarkation is only possible in calm conditions. The island lacks a genuine anchorage. To avoid disturbing the ground-nesting birds and the delicate ecosystem of the island, the National Trust for Scotland asks people not to bring dogs to Staffa.

== See also ==
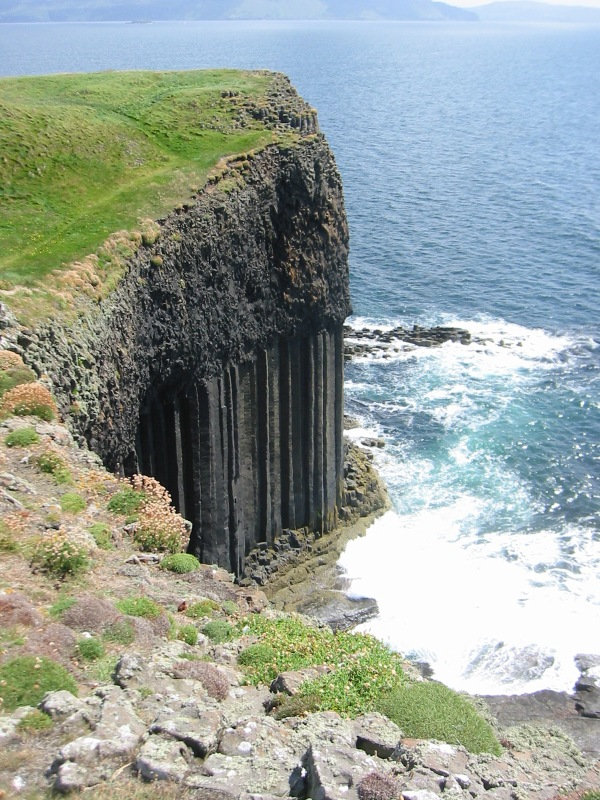
Above The Colonnade

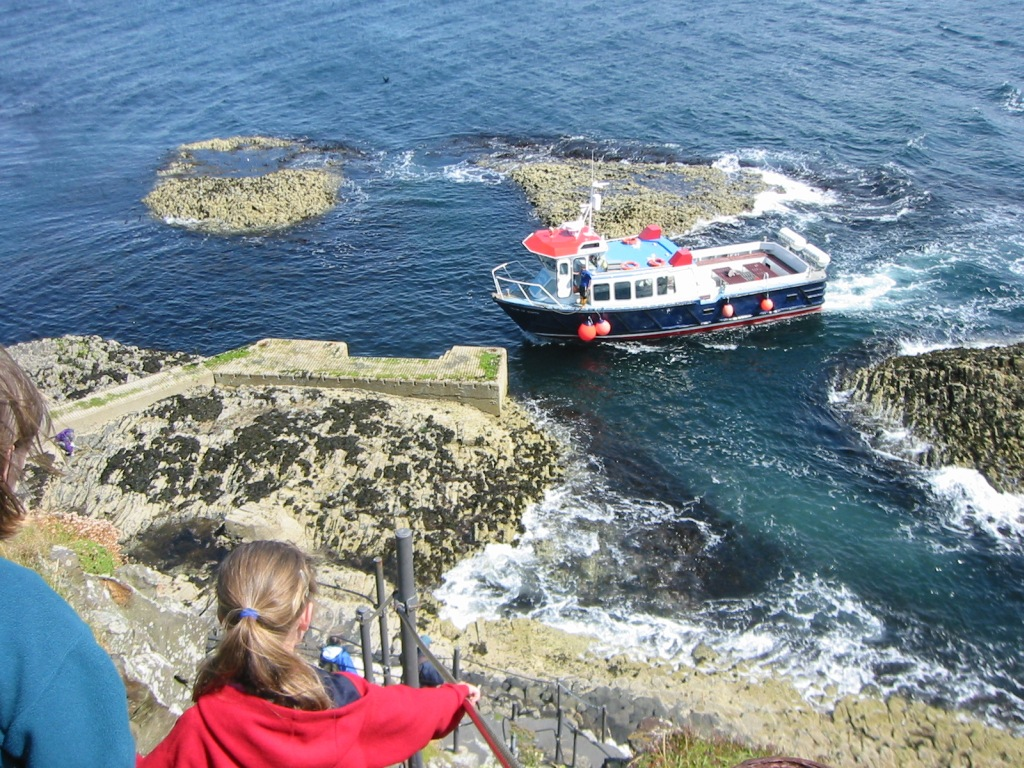
The landing place

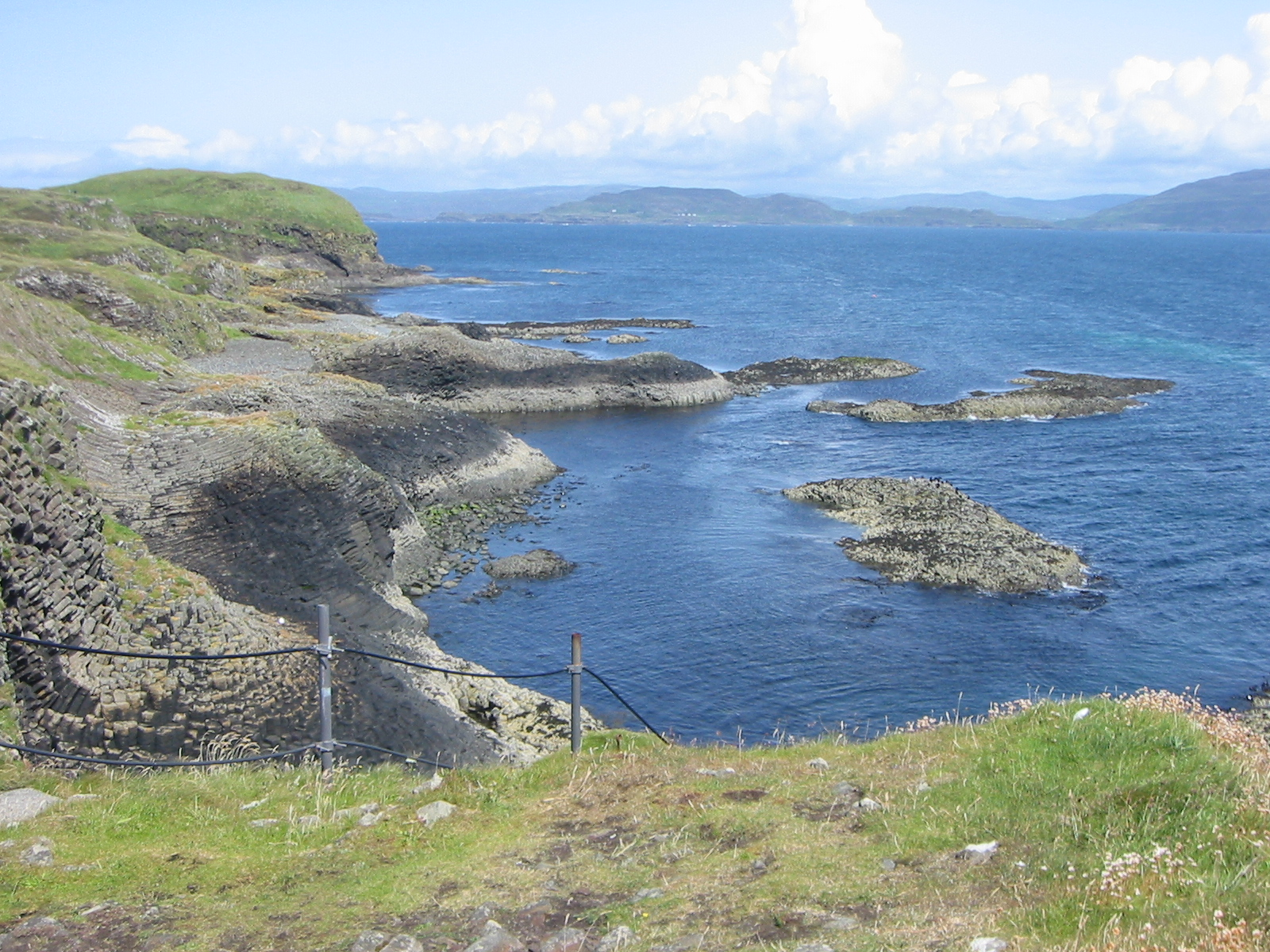
View looking northeast to Ulva

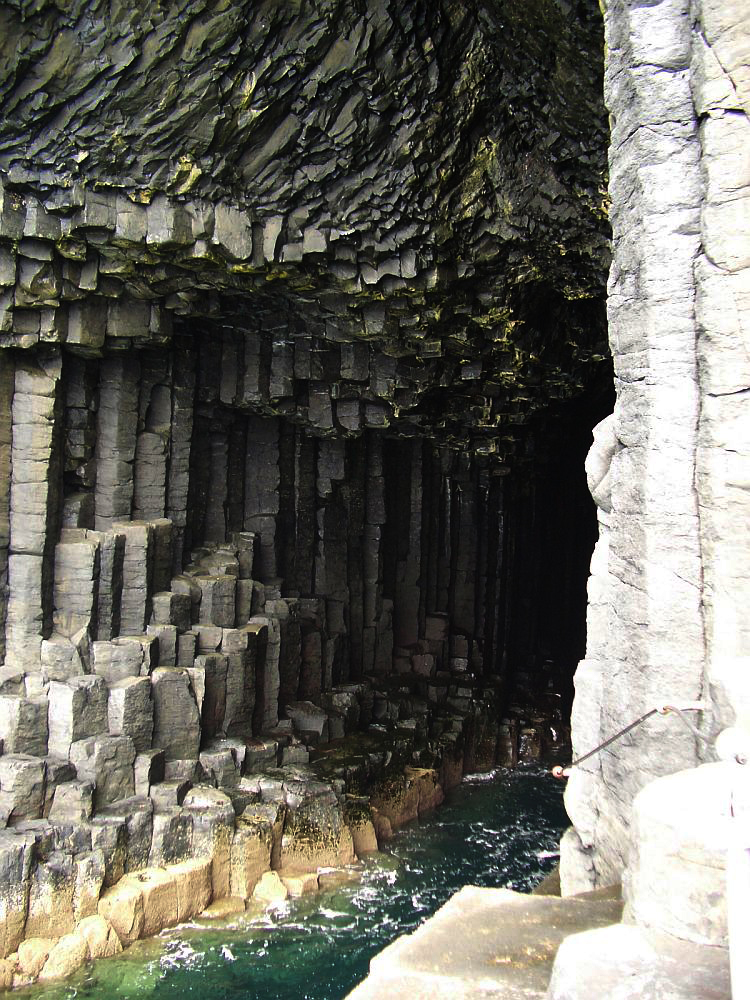
Basalt columns inside Fingal's Cave

- Fingal's Cave
- Hebrides Overture
- Clan MacQuarrie

== Bibliography ==
- Bray, Elizabeth (1996) The Discovery of the Hebrides: Voyages to the Western Isles 1745-1883. Edinburgh. Birlinn.
- Cooper, Derek (1979) Road to the Isles: Travellers in the Hebrides 1770-1914. London. Routledge & Kegan Paul.
- Haswell-Smith, Hamish. (2004) The Scottish Islands. Edinburgh. Canongate.
- Keay, J. & Keay, J. (1994) Collins Encyclopaedia of Scotland. London. HarperCollins.
- Murray, W.H. (1973) The Islands of Western Scotland. London. Eyre Methuen.
