= Ulva =

Island in the Inner Hebrides of Scotland

Ulbha (Gaelic)
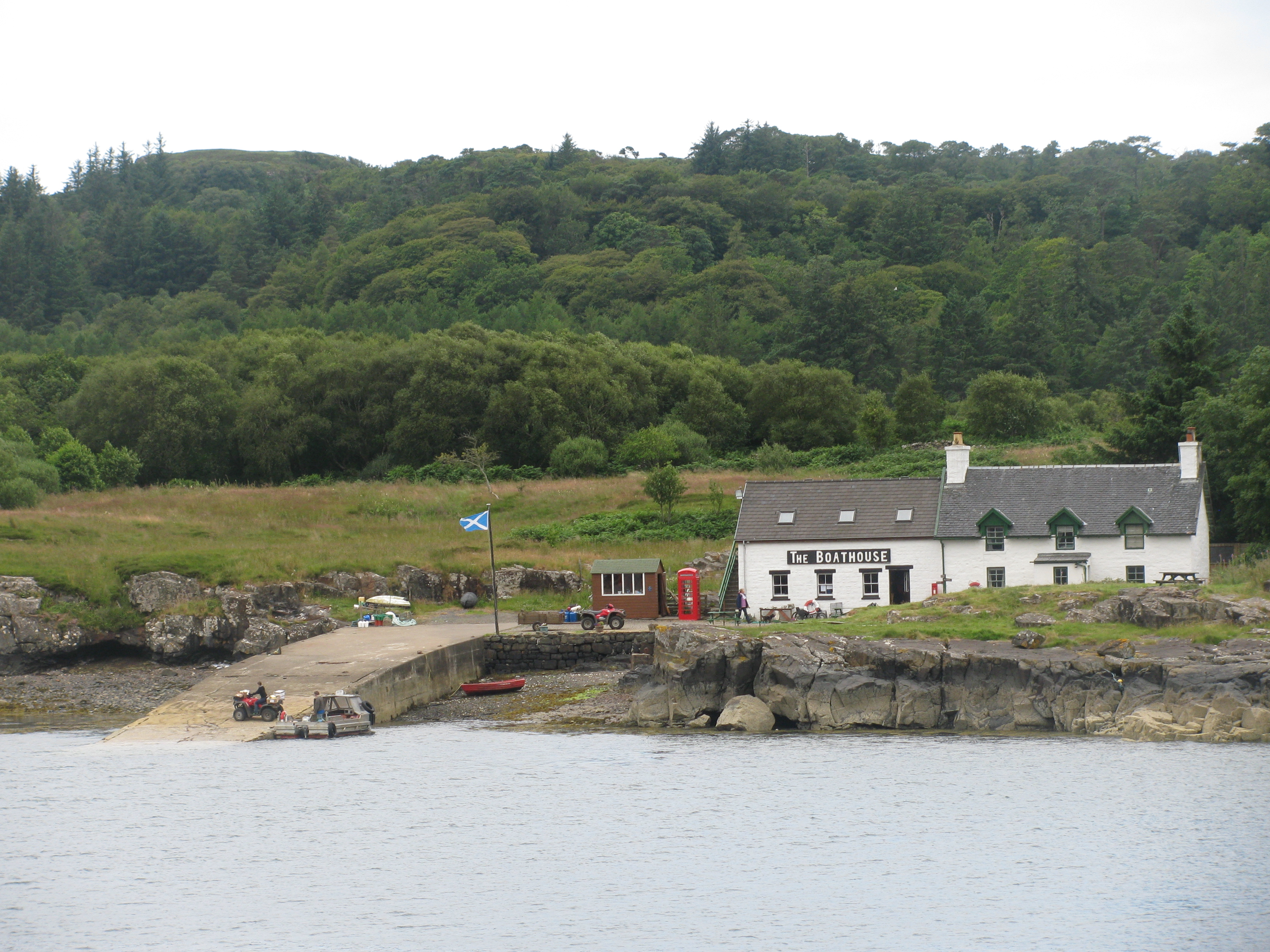
- The Boathouse café

Location
- Ulva shown relative to Mull
- OS grid reference: NM410396
- Coordinates: 56°28′49″N 06°12′18″W

Name
- Gaelic pronunciation: [ˈul̪ˠu(v)ə]
- Name meaning: Old Norse for 'wolf island' or 'Ulfr's island'
- Old Norse name: Ulv-øy/Ulfrsey

Physical geography
- Island group: Mull
- Area: 1,990 ha (7 5/8 sq mi)
- Area rank: 35
- Highest elevation: Beinn Chreagach 313 m (1,027 ft)

Administration
- Council area: Argyll and Bute
- Country: Scotland
- Sovereign state: United Kingdom

Demographics
- Population: 6
- Population rank: 76=
- Population density: 0.3/km^{2} (0.78/sq mi)
- Largest settlement: Ulva House (once Ormaig)

Ulva (/ˈʌlvə/; Scottish Gaelic: Ulbha) is a small island in the Inner Hebrides of Scotland, off the west coast of Mull. It is separated from Mull by a narrow strait, and connected to the neighbouring island of Gometra by a bridge. Much of the island is formed from Cenozoic basalt rocks, which are formed into columns in places.

Ulva has been populated since the Mesolithic period, and there are various Neolithic remains on the island. The Norse occupation of the island in the Early Middle Ages has left few tangible artefacts but did bequeath the island its name, which is probably from Ulvoy, meaning "wolf island". Celtic culture was a major influence during both Pictish and Dalriadan times as well as the post-Norse period when the islands became part of modern Scotland. This long period, when Gaelic became the dominant language, was ended by the 19th-century Clearances. At its height, Ulva had a population of over 800, but by May 2019, this had declined to 5. Some increase in the number of residents was expected in future, with the re-population plan that was to commence in 2020 although by 2022 the resident population was just six.

Numerous well-known individuals have connections with the island including David Livingstone, Samuel Johnson and Walter Scott, who drew inspiration from Ulva for his 1815 poem, The Lord of the Isles. Wildlife is abundant: cetaceans are regularly seen in the surrounding waters and over 500 species of plant have been recorded. Today there is a regular ferry service and tourism is the mainstay of the economy. In March 2018 the Scottish Land Fund pledged £4.4 million towards a community buyout of the island, and the North West Mull Community Woodland Company took ownership of the island on 21 June 2018.

== Geography ==
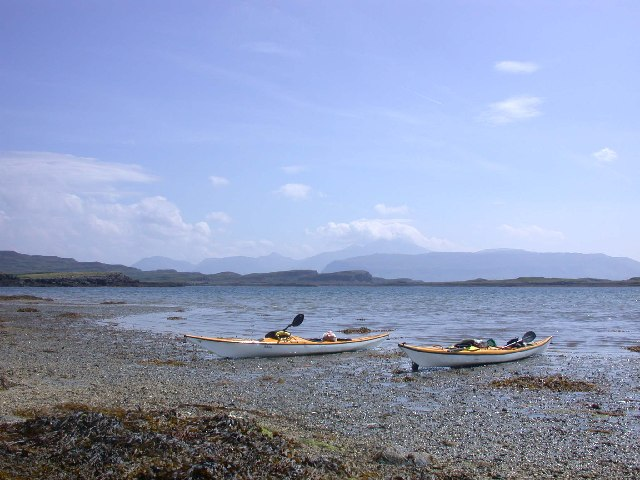
Tràigh Bhàn, looking South east toward Ben More on Mull.

Ulva is roughly oval in shape with an indented coastline. It is aligned east-west, being 12 kilometres (7 1/2 miles) long, and 4 kilometres (2 1/2 miles) wide. Viewed on a small scale, Ulva and its neighbouring island Gometra appear to be a peninsula of the Isle of Mull, as they are separated from one another by narrow straits. Caolas Ulbha (the Sound of Ulva) at the east of the island is a narrow channel a few hundred metres across to Ulva Ferry on Mull. To its west, it is separated from Gometra by Gometra Harbour. To the south are Mull's headlands of Ardmeanach and the Ross of Mull. To the north, Loch Tuath (Loch-a-Tuath) separates it from another headland of Mull, and to the south east is Loch na Keal (Loch nan Ceall), and the island of Eorsa. There are two main bays on the south coast, Port a' Bhàta, and Tràigh Bhàn. On the north coast, there is the horseshoe bay of Lòn Bhearnuis (Bearnus lagoon), Soriby Bay and a few minor inlets.

The highest point of Ulva is Beinn Chreagach ("rocky mountain"), which reaches 313 m (1,027 ft). It has a neighbour in Beinn Eoligarry the summit of which is 306 m (1,004 ft) above sea level. The island has a central ridge, with the highest ground running along its lateral axis - this ridge is somewhat broken by Gleann Glas and some other valleys. The south east peninsula tends to be lower lying, with a small plain along the south coast, consisting of raised beaches.

=== Parish and region ===
Ulva was part of Argyll pre-1974, and Strathclyde Region after that. It is now part of Argyll and Bute.

The island, previously a quoad sacra parish with its own church, is in the civil parish of Kilninian and Kilmore (Cill Ninein, Chille Mhór), which also includes Gometra, Staffa, Little Colonsay and the north-west part of Mull. The minister traditionally preached in Kilninian and Kilmore on alternate Sundays. For more details, see the church section.

=== Surrounding islands ===
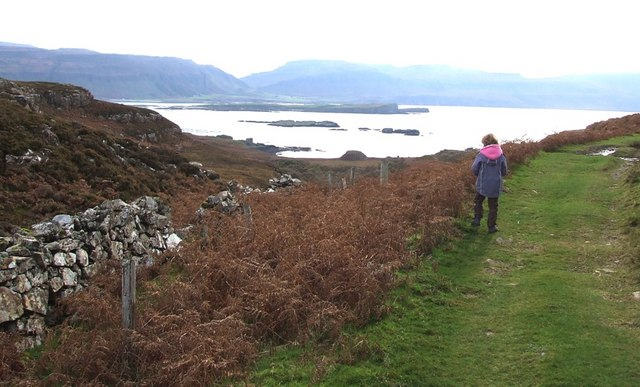
A view from Ormaig to the south east: the nearer islets are Geasgill Mòr & Geasgill Beag, while the longer island behind them is Inch Kenneth

Gometra is a tidal island and connected to Ulva by a bridge. Little Colonsay and Inchkenneth (with Samalan Island) are to Ulva's south west and south east respectively. Further to the west are the Treshnish Isles, including the distinctive Bac Mòr, and beyond them, the larger islands of Coll and Tiree, with Gunna between them. To the south west are the islands of Staffa, of Fingal's Cave fame and Erisgeir. Much further to the south west is the island of Iona.

There are a number of smaller islets and rocks off Ulva. To the south and the east are Eilean na Creiche (listed as "Eilean na Craoibhe", on the island's guide's map.) between Little Colonsay and Ulva. Off Port a' Bhàta are Geasgill Beag & Geasgill Mòr, between Ulva and Inchkenneth. To the south west is Sgeir na Sgeireadh, and Màisgeir due south of Gometra. These islands, along with Ulva itself, form part of the Loch na Keal National Scenic Area, one of the forty national scenic areas in Scotland, which are defined so as to identify areas of exceptional scenery and to ensure its protection from inappropriate development.

== Geology ==
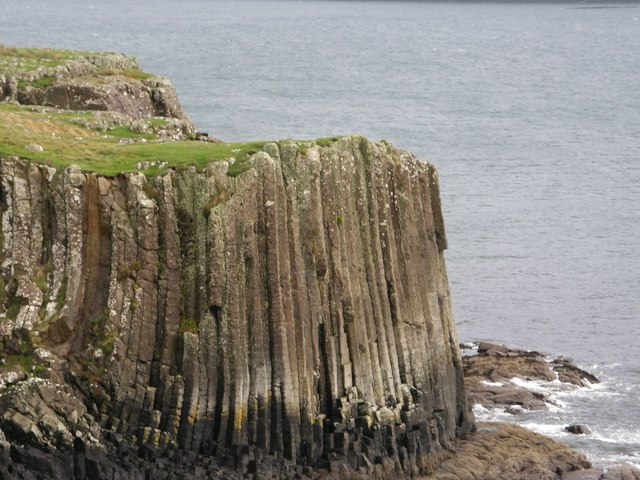
Basalt cliffs, near Dùn Bhioramuill on south coast

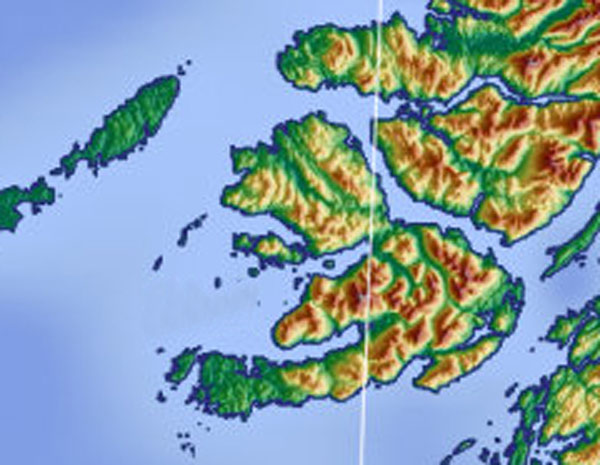
Topography of Ulva and surrounding area

Ulva's interior is moorland, while the spectacular geological formations of the south coast, have been somewhat overshadowed by those of its neighbour Staffa. Nonetheless, they are still renowned in their own right. Around 60 million years ago, the region was volcanically active, with Ben More on Mull being the remnant of a volcano, and it was in this period that the famous rock formations of Staffa and the basaltic columns of "The Castles" on Ulva came into being. The lava flows are known as the "Staffa Magma Type member" and can also be seen on Mull at Carsaig, Ardtum, and near Tobermory on its east coast. They are particularly rich in silica. These were formed when the cooling surface of the mass of hot lava cracked in a hexagonal pattern in a similar way to drying mud cracking as it shrinks, and these cracks gradually extended down into the mass of lava as it cooled and shrank to form the columns which were subsequently exposed by erosion.

Much more recently, Ulva was subjected to glaciation, which dug out the fjords/sea lochs on its north and south east sides – Loch Tuath (meaning simply "north loch") and Loch na Keal, as well as softening some of its sharper edges.

The Hebridean coastline has been subject to significant post-glacial changes in sea level and the area is rising up at about 2 mm (1/16 in) per annum as isostatic equilibrium is regained. The relative drop in sea-level has left the highest raised sea cave in the British Isles on Ulva at A' Chrannag. At some point, Ulva was probably a west pointing headland of Mull, connected to Gometra and Eilean Dioghlum off the latter's west coast.

== Etymology ==
The derivation of "Ulva" is not certain, but is probably from the Old Norse for "wolf isle". Samuel Johnson deduced that it was probably not Gaelic in origin:

[sic] The name is supposed to be a depravation of some other; for the Earse language does not afford it any etymology.

The English name "Ulva" is from the Scottish Gaelic, Ulbha, but this may have been corruption of Old Norse. It is debatable whether the Norse root Ulfr refers to an individual's name, or to the animal itself (possibly because of the shape of the island). The island's official website and guide book claims -

A scout, sent ashore from the longboat is alleged to have reported, "Ullamhdha", Viking for "Nobody home".

However ullamhdha is not Norse, but appears to be the Scottish Gaelic for "ready for it". Munro and MacQuarrie (1996) state that the scout said "ullamh dha" ([ˈulˠ̪əv ɣa]) in Gaelic, meaning the island "was ready for occupation".

The Old Statistical Account of Scotland mentions an alternative folk etymology, namely that Ulva comes from ullamh-àth ([ˈulˠ̪əv aː]) meaning 'ready ford' in Gaelic, that could refer either to the tidal stretch with Gometra, or the Sound of Ulva over which cattle were sometimes swum.

== History ==
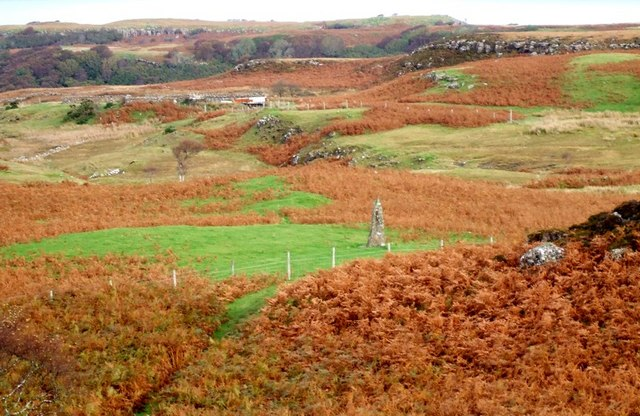
Ulva has been inhabited since prehistoric times

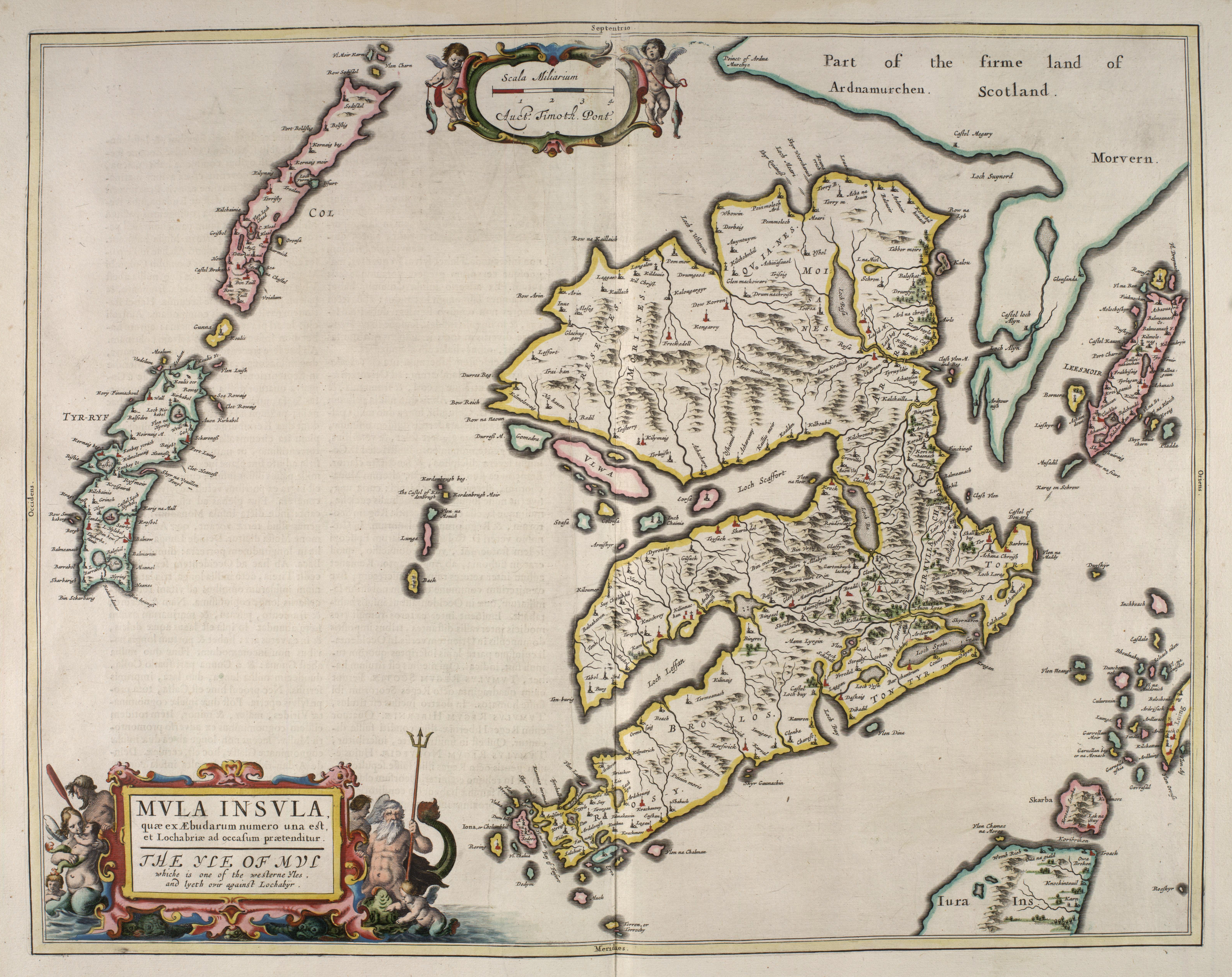
"VLWA" and surrounding islands from Blaeu's Atlas Maior (1654)

=== Prehistory ===
Ulva's human history goes back thousands of years. Its standing stones have been dated to 1500 BC, and a shell midden in Livingstones Cave dates to c. 5650 BC; it includes remains of flint and a human infant, as well as fauna more appropriate to the Ice Age, such as lemming and Arctic fox (Alopex lagopus). The cave has been excavated since 1987 by archaeologists from the University of Edinburgh.

There are a number of dolmens and standing stones on the island, including some west of Cragaig, and one north east of Ormaig, as well as dùns such as Dùn Bhioramuill on the south east slope of A' Chrannag near Cùl a' Gheata above the cliffs, and Dùn Iosagain on the south west slope of Beinn Eolasary.

=== Dál Riata ===
Ulva was anciently part of the border zone of the kingdom of Dál Riata, and during this period the old Gaelic language first came to be spoken here. Presumably the area formed part of the Pictish lands, but they left little evidence behind. This region was amongst the first in northern Scotland to become Christianised. This is commemorated in some of the local place names which contain the word "Cill" or "Ceall", which is frequently anglicised as "Kil-" e.g. "Loch na Keal" is Loch nan Ceall, meaning "loch of the culdee cells", and Cille Mhic Eoghainn, which means literally "Monk's cell of the son of Ewan/MacEwan", or less literally "MacEwan's Church".

The Senchus fer n-Alban lists three main kin groups in Dál Riata in Scotland, with a fourth being added later. The Cenél Loairn controlled parts of northern Argyll around the Firth of Lorne, most probably centred on Lorne but perhaps including the Isle of Mull, Morvern and Ardnamurchan, supposedly the descendants of Loarn mac Eirc. The chief place of the kingdom appears to have been at Dun Ollaigh, near Oban. The chief religious site may have been on Lismore, later the seat of the High Medieval bishop of Argyll.

Saint Columba (Colm Cille) visited Ulva in 563.

=== Norse period and Middle Ages ===
Ulva later became part of the Norse Kingdom of the Isles. Rubha nan Gall ("point of the foreigners"), on the north coast of the island, may refer to the Norse.

Gometra and Inchkenneth nearby both have connections to Iona so it is not likely that Ulva had as well. Ulva came under the Diocese of Sodor and Man, and then the Diocese of Argyll.

Ulva came into the possession of the Clan MacQuarrie (an anglicised version of the surname MacGuaire) family over a thousand years ago, and they controlled it until the mid-19th century. The name MacGuaire is also anglicised as McGuire in Ireland. The English version has many variants, for examples, a 16th-century clan chief was Donn-slèibhe MacGuaire, possibly the ancestor of the Livingstone (MacDhùn-lèibhe) family. MacKenzie mentions that his name was anglicised in the following widely differing versions - "Dunslavie McVoirich" (either MacMhuirich (which becomes Currie or MacPherson) or MacMhurchaidh), "Dulleis MacKwiddy", "Dwnsleif MacKcurra" and "Dwnsleyf MaKwra". "Dunslav" was recorded as a forename in Ulva in 1693 as well.

The Ulva Brooch was found in a pool of water in a cave in 1998. Its exact date of origin is unknown, but it is reckoned to be 16th or 17th century. The original is now in a museum in Dunoon, and a replica can be seen in Sheila's Cottage on the island. It is an engraved woman's brooch, for keeping a shawl tied together, and is believed to have been left in the cave after someone sheltered there.

=== 18th century ===
In 1722, the inhabitants of Ulva were sent to a court in Inveraray, because they had taken oil from a stranded whale.

During the second Jacobite uprising, Clan MacQuarrie fought at Culloden on Charles Edward Stuart's side.

The Rev. John Walker lamented the lack of commercial fishing, which he thought could provide the islanders with an additional income and food source. He noted the presence of herring, cod, and ling in the surrounding waters, but said, that there was

[N]o net or Long Line on the island to catch them [fish] and none of the inhabitants were acquainted with any kind of fishing, but with the Rod from Sea Rocks".

==== Lachlan Macquarie ====
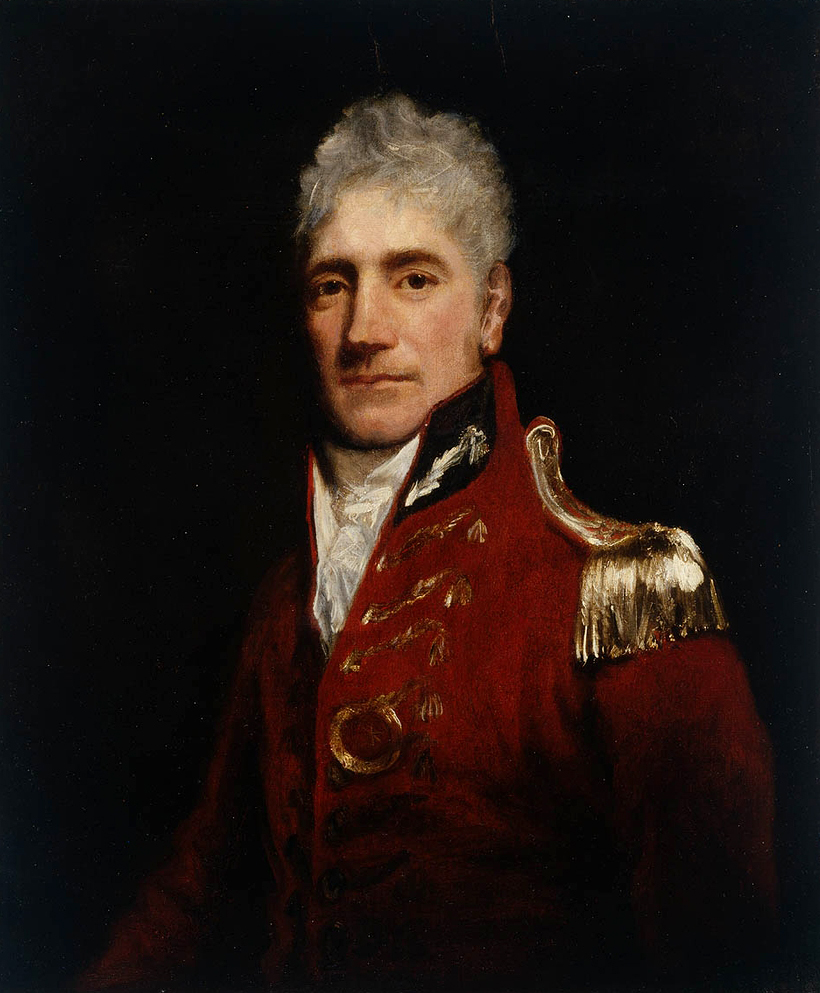
Lachlan Macquarie, "Father of Australia" was born on Ulva.

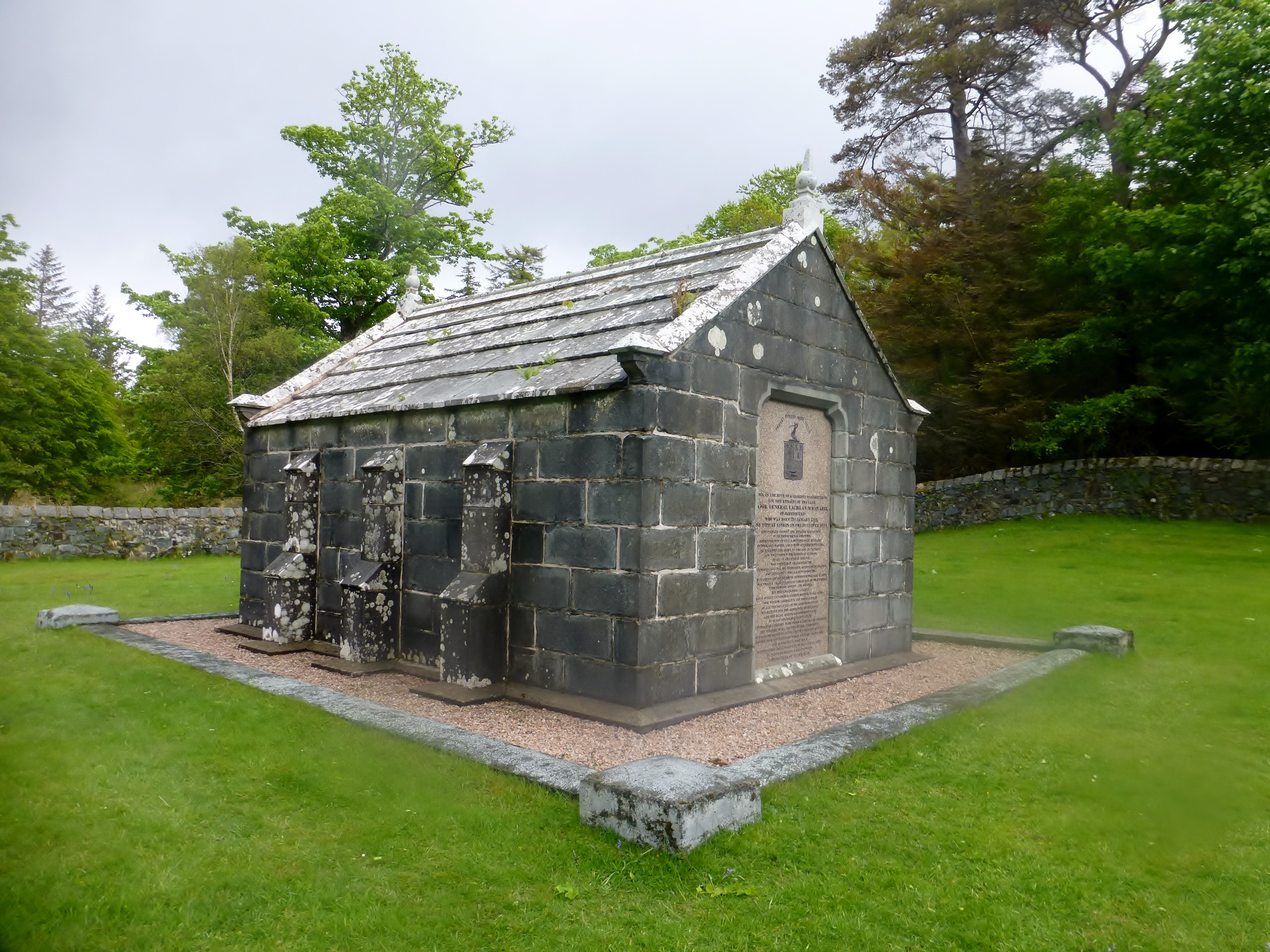
Macquarie Mausoleum on Mull

Lachlan Macquarie was born on Ulva on 31 January 1762. He is sometimes referred to as "Father of Australia". He left when he was 14, and was Governor of New South Wales from 1809–21, the longest tenure of any Australian governor. However, after his long sojourns in India, Australia and elsewhere, Lachlan Macquarie returned to his home turf. His mausoleum may still be seen at Gruline on Loch na Keal, on the Isle of Mull, within sight of his home island. The mausoleum is possibly the only site in Scotland maintained by the National Trust of Australia.

His father, who had the same name, was a cousin of the sixteenth and last chieftain of the clan. According to local tradition, he was either a miller or a carpenter. There is some argument as to where exactly he was born: Ormaig is generally stated, because he appears to have come from that branch of the clan. It has even been suggested that he was born on the near section of Mull – at either Oskamull or Lagganulva, but local tradition says he was born at Cùl a' Gheata, which is 1/4 mile (400 metres) south of Ulva House. Clan Macquarrie Lachlan MacQuarrie, the last chief to live on the island, claimed that his clan had possessed Ulva since the 9th century; and although the chiefs are not on public record until the mid-15th century, they can produce a pedigree of sorts going back to the 13th. They even claim kinship with Saint Columba. General Lachlan MacQuarrie, the most famous member of the clan, was possibly born at Ormaig on the Mull side after his parents moved there from Ulva. After a military career, he became the first Governor of New South Wales and Australians make pilgrimages to his mausoleum at Gruline on Mull.

The men of Ulva were known in sonorous Gaelic as "the fierce, fearless, great-feated MacQuarries". Their war cry was "The Red Tartan Army" and they took part in many far flung battles – at Inverkeithing, Bannockburn, in the colonies. Graves of MacQuarries at Culloden are on the right hand side where other Mull men rest. They followed the MacLeans who joined Prince Charles under MacLean of Drimnin at Stirling. An Ulva man carried the banner back from Culloden. With it wrapped around his body, he swam home across the sound. David Livingston was a descendant of this warrior.

MacQuarrie needed to sell Ulva in 1777 to pay his debts but many of his clan remained on the island for over a century.

In 1787, Macquarie came back to Mull and Ulva, to try to recruit men for the British army. Few Ulbhachs had any interest, and he deemed them "ungrateful":

I was equally unsuccessful in the place of my Nativity, and ancient Possessions of my Ancestors, – among my own Clan and Namesakes, the Macquaries of Ulva; where every fair and Lawful Means were used by their old Chief and Master, my Relation the Laird of Macquarie, and myself; but, such is the aversion of these People to become Soldiers or to go abroad, that notwithstanding all the entreaties of their old Chief and Master, not one of his ungrateful Clan, (to whom he had been, in the days of his Prosperity, a most kind and Generous Master,) would enlist or follow me and his own Son Murdoch Macquarie, (a lad about Sixteen years of age) who voluntarily offered to follow my Fortunes, and push his own in India – as a Volunteer. — I was not much surprised, tho' at the same time I confess I was exceedingly displeased, at the ungrateful conduct of these People, who had treated their old chief exactly in the same manner, when he got his Commission in the Army in Decr. 1777 and hoped to get his whole Quota of Men among his own Clan; but in this, he was cruelly disappointed, very few indeed, having followed him to the American War: – it would appear he had lost his Power and influence over them, at the same moment he had lost the Estate of his Ancestors. Finding I had no success in the Recruiting way in Mull I determined upon setting out for the Low Country without loss of time to Recruit there".

Whilst in India, Macquarie sent significant amounts of money back to support kith and kin in Ulva and the Highlands.

=== 19th century ===
By the early 19th century, potatoes were a major staple of the island, and Ulva exported them.

The main remnants of Clan MacQuarrie's chiefs fell at the battles of Malda and Waterloo. Their mother Marie was given a medal by King George IV with the slogan Màthair nan Gaisgich - "mother of heroes" on it.

==== Kelp industry ====
Until the mid-19th century its main industry was kelp collection and export, primarily operated by Staffa MacDonald who bought the island in 1785 because of the kelp. At the turn of the 19th century, the kelp industry supported a large amount of the population. It was seasonal work, with collection taking place in the months of May, June and July, when it was considered possible to dry it outdoors. The dried kelp would usually then be burnt, and the ash used to produce various products, including fertiliser (mostly soda ash) and iodine as well as glass and soap. The ruined kiln on the south shore may have been used for this. Between 1817 and 1828, no less than 256 tonnes of kelp were collected in Ulva. Kelpers collected on average, a wage of two shillings a week, and a stone of wheat.

Ulva's Kelp Industry Seaweed plays an important role in the history of Ulva. It was burned to produce kelp, a product in great demand in the early 19th century for making glass and soap. Being a labour-intensive process (it took 20 tons of seaweed to produce 1 ton of kelp) Ulva's population grew to meet the demands of cutting, carrying and burning enough seaweed for an average output of 23 tons of kelp per year. In 1785 Ulva was purchased by a pioneer of the kelp burning industry and his son, Staffa MacDonald was reputed to have "trebled his income and doubled his population by careful attention to his kelp shores".

==== The Clearances ====
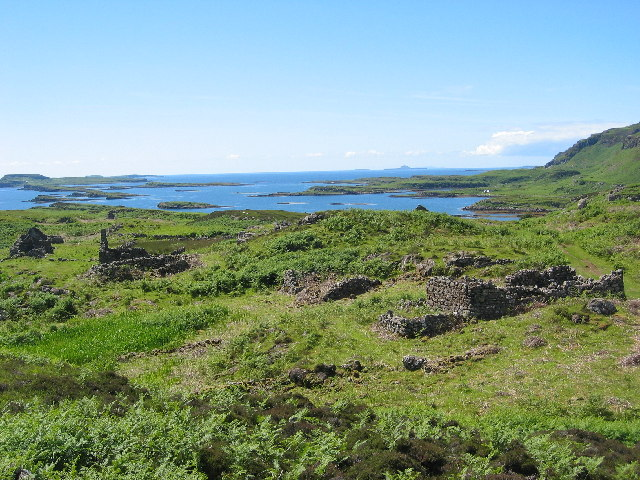
Ormaig was once the principal settlement on the island. It had been inhabited since prehistoric times, until it was cleared by Francis William Clark in the mid-19th century.

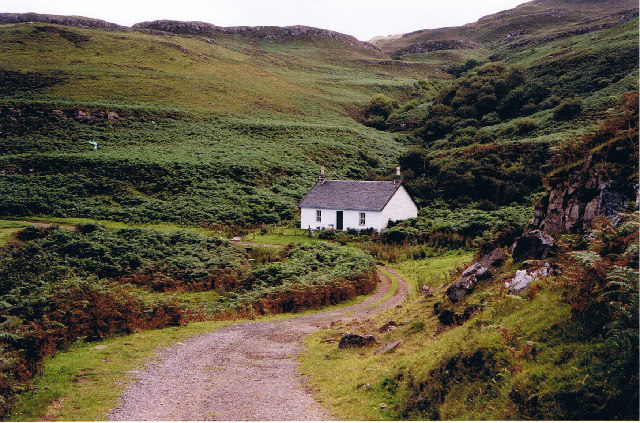
The only house currently inhabited at Bearnus

Francis William Clark, a lawyer from Stirling, bought the island in 1835. According to the Isle of Mull website, Ulva was booming in 1837, with a population of 604 people.

After the Clearances ordered by Clark, two-thirds of the islanders were gone within a few years. Sometimes those who were to be evicted were given no warning, and had the thatch of their houses set on fire by "brutal landowners who replaced them with more economically sound sheep", according to one news report. In 1841, the population of Ulva and Gometra was 859, but by 1848 this had plummeted to 150 thanks to a combination of the Highland potato famine and Clark's mass evictions. In 1849, 360 people lived on Ulva, but that number had dropped to 51 by 1881.

MacKenzie records at Aird Glas, near Ardalum, the now abandoned row of houses was nicknamed "Starvation Terrace":

...Where the old and feeble folk cleared from their crofts were placed by Clark, to exist as best they could on shellfish & seaweed till they died.

He thinks however, that the plan may not have been to starve them, but to create fishing stations of the type which Walker lamented the lack of. This is certainly what was attempted in Sutherland. Opinions on Clark remain divided. The island's guidebook claims:

Clark's high hopes for this thriving community were shattered when the kelp market collapsed, and he was left with a great surplus of tenants. His greatest concern would have been for the people and their livelihoods.

One of Clark's neighbours did not think much of his concern, and is reported to have shouted "Francis William Clark, there's a smell of your name all over Scotland".

In an era in which large-scale evictions were commonplace — those of Torloisg and Glengorm for example — this Francis William Clark gained a notoriety that matched or exceeded that of the [other] evicting landlords of his time. 'Notorious', 'ruthless', 'cruel', 'callous' are some of the epithets attached to his name.

MacKenzie further notes, that unlike in Sutherland, where the Clearances are most remembered, there was no factor or middle man to provide a buffer between the tenants and the landlord, like the notorious Patrick Sellar, and that Clark did a lot of the evicting himself.

In evidence to the Napier Commission, Alexander Fletcher recounted that Clark moved people from one piece of land to a small one, repeatedly "then to nothing at all, and when they would not clear off altogether, some of them had the roofs taken off their huts."

Fletcher also claimed that Clark bullied the sick and the elderly: "In another case, there was a very sick woman... Notwithstanding the critical condition of the woman, he [F. W. Clark] had the roof taken down to a small bit over the woman's bed." Another recorded that a woman fetching water at a well was so terrified of him, that she "ran away, and left her kettle at the well, which Mr Clark took hold of and smashed to pieces."

F. W. Clark was still alive at the time of the reports to the Napier Commission, and never made any attempt to refute these accusations. His son, of the same name, disagreed vocally with his father's behaviour and said, "he would rather have a cailleach (old woman) to light his pipe in every ruined house than all the sheep... of Ulva".

The Clark family continued to own the island until 1945. F. W. Clark also bought, and cleared, the islands of Gometra and Little Colonsay.

Cleared townships and their state in 2000 include:

Name/location	1841 census	State in 1918-21
Ormaig	52	Ruins
Cragaig	57	1 family (Now a camping bothy)
Cill MhicEòghainn (Kilvikewan)	32	Ruins
Eolasary	32	Ruins
Glac na Gallan	35	Ruins
Baile Ghartan (Ballygarten)	32	Ruins
Bearnus (Berniss)	25	1 family
Culinis(h)	52	Ruins
Abas (Aboss)	33	Ruins
Soriby	29	Ruins
Fearann Ard-àirigh (Ferinardry)	54	Ruins
Ardalum (Ardellum)	46	2 families
Sàilean Ruadh (Salen)	?	1 family (at Croit Phàraig)
Caolas (Sound of Ulva)	23	1 family
Uamh (Cave) & Sound Islands	at least one family	1 family (Ulva House)

Clark had a memorial built to himself, and his family on top of the Iron Age fort at Dùn Bhioramuill. A huge marble slab to F. W. Clark was "accidentally" lost in the mire, on its way to be placed here. Some say this was deliberate, but according to local folklore, this was due to the "weight of evil on it". The other parts of the memorial may still be seen.

=== 20th century ===
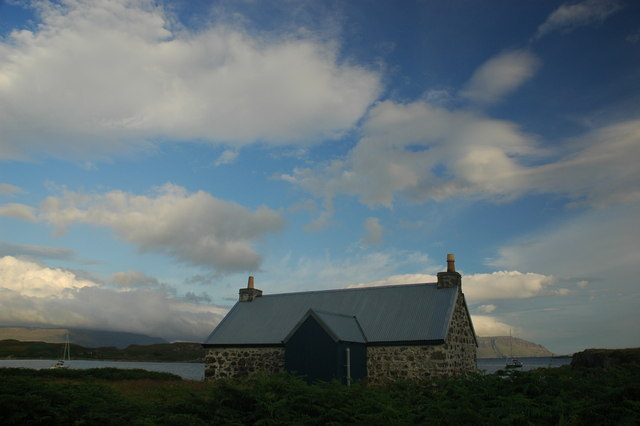
The bothy at Cragaig. Cragaig was once a thriving settlement

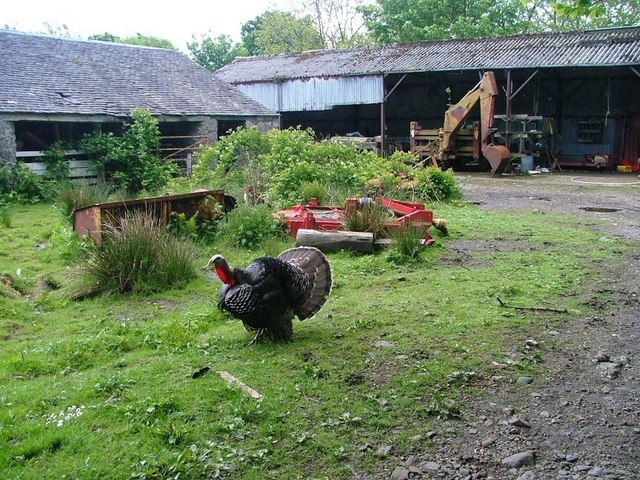
Meall Min: Farming still plays a major role in the Ulva community

In The Scottish Field (September 1918), there is a description by Angus Henderson of how the cattle were driven to "mainland" Mull.

The handsome herds of Ulva were 'floated' across the ferry on their way to the Oban sales... The cattle are driven into the water, and forced to swim to a small island, there, they are allowed to rest for a few minutes and then they are made to complete their swim to Mull. Men in boats guide them to the right landing places.

During the 20th century, the population of Ulva continued to fall. In 1981 it dropped to 13, the lowest point in recorded history until then. By 1991, however, it had risen to 30, mostly due to incomers working on the island. In 2001 the usually resident population was 16 but by 2011 it had decreased again to 11. During the same period Scottish island populations as a whole grew by 4% to 103,702.

The Clarks owned the island for the best part of a century, selling it in 1945 to Edith, Lady Congleton, with her daughter Jean Howard then owning it, and her grandson James Howard as estate manager. Under the Howards, the population fluctuated, rather than falling continuously as it had under the Clarks.

In 1950, Queen Elizabeth and the royal yacht, Britannia visited.

In 2000, D. W. R. MacKenzie wrote As It Was/Sin Mar a Bha: An Ulva Boyhood, which is a combination of autobiography and a potted history of the island. His father was a Church of Scotland minister, who moved there from Rothesay, where he had been in charge of the Gaelic church there. MacKenzie describes his early impressions, as a child, of the island in the 1920s, and how the minister's children slowly began to recognise the landscape of eviction:

We saw ruins of houses (tobhtaichean) roofless and windowless, and near them neglected green patches that had obviously been cultivated at one time. We saw overgrown ridges and furrows that once had been the lazybeds (feannagan) on which former inhabitants had grown their potatoes and cereals. When returned home from our explorations, to recount our discoveries, we learned, over the years, that the Ulva of 1827, when the church and the manse were built was very different from the Ulva we came to know a hundred years later."

According to a 2018 publication by Tourism Scotland, "There are no tarmac roads on Ulva, so no cars, just the 4 wheel cross country bikes used by all inhabitants".

== Infrastructure and economy ==
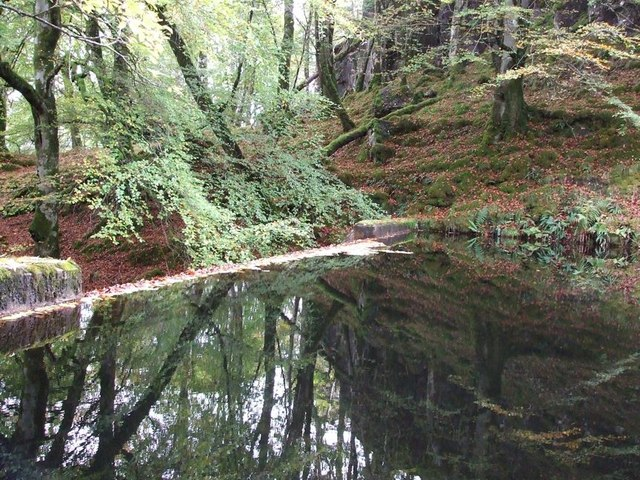
A' Chrannag dam, which provides Ulva island with much of its drinking water

None of the island's roads is tarmacked or numbered, due to the low population, and there are no fewer than six fords on the length of the southern road. There is however a bridge to Gometra, which can also be reached dry-shod at low tide. Like certain other islands, e.g. Sark, there are no cars, but quad bikes and tractors are used.

A ferry sails from Ulva to the hamlet of Ulva Ferry on Mull, on request. Ulva Primary School is in fact on Mull at Ulva Ferry. There are ruined school buildings still to be seen at Glac na Gallan and Fearann Àrd-àirigh.

Ulva's main industry now is tourism. Other industries on the island include sheep and cattle farming, and fish farming (salmon at Soriby Bay). There is also a small sawmill. Other than camping, accommodation for tourists has been limited until the 2020s to a bothy and sometimes workers' housing; a hostel opened in 2023. The kelp industry was revived in 2026 with hand-harvested kelp the key ingredient for a local product.

In the summer of 2017, the island was put up for sale by owner Jamie Howard. The North West Mull Community Trust was granted the right to register its interest in a community buyout, which was subsequently backed by 63.9% of voters in a poll ordered by the Scottish government, with residents of Ulva and part of Mull eligible to vote.

Subsequently, the government had stopped the attempt to sell Ulva on the open market. A fundraising appeal was launched and in March 2018 the Scottish Land Fund pledged £4.4 million towards a community buyout. John Watt, the chair of the Fund, stated that it was a "momentous day" for local residents. "I wish them every success as they go on to raise the remaining funding that will allow them to turn their dreams into reality." The buyout was completed on 21 June 2018. The North West Mull Community Woodland Company acquired the Ulva Estate, through the Community Right to Buy legislation.

A 2019 news report provided the following specifics:

"The community company raised £4.4m from the Scottish Land Fund to buy Ulva from owner Jamie Howard, whose family had owned the island for 70 years. The total purchase cost £4.65m with a global fundraising effort helping to secure the balance".

=== Re-development master plan ===
By 21 June 2018, the sale of the island had been concluded. The subsequent master plan for the island involves making improvements, increasing the population and returning farming to Ulva. More specifically, the residents were "hoping to create jobs here, build new affordable housing and tempt young Scots to make it their home". Some of the ideas discussed in spring 2018 included opening a campsite, hostel and mini-hotel and to commence oyster farming. Roughly 5,000 people visited the island each summer. In February 2019, repairs to the slipway and the connecting pier on Mull were completed, beneficial for both ferry passengers and fisherman working out of the Sound. The project was funded by Marine Scotland.

Restoration of the oldest blackhouse on the island was being completed in October 2019; it is the one closest to the ferry dock. The building is known as Sheila's cottage, since it was the home of dairy maid Sheila MacFadgen from 1911 to the 1950s, the last resident of the row of cottages. This was the second significant step in the Ulva master plan.

At that time, Wendy Reid, Ulva's development manager, said that the hope was for the population to increase to 20 by 2024 and to 50 in the future. To help attract new residents, six houses were scheduled for renovation, including three that were vacant. By late 2019, news suggested that the population could "soar by 6,000%" as a result of the campaign to encourage people to move to the island. Reid said that the goal was to attract people of any background, but who would benefit the community. Ulva House was being converted into self catering flats.

In January 2020, 30 Highland cattle were scheduled to be delivered to the island since the plan includes "communion between humans, animals and nature", according to Reid. Until then, the island was supporting a small flock of wild Hebridean sheep and a few feral goats. During the year, efforts to refurbish other old dwellings would continue. The restorations were expected to be planned by the community and completed under the supervision of Argyll and Bute Council. Land sales would also commence.

In May 2021, the island announced a drive to replace petrol and diesel-engined quad bikes with all electric vehicles, and the start of work to restore three tenanted homes and three vacant properties on the island.

=== Hotel redevelopment and tourism increase ===
The Boathouse restaurant opened near the ferry landing in 2007 and specialises in seafood and home baking. In the 2010s, Australian interior designer Banjo Beale and his husband Ro Christopher moved to Ulva and Beale helped renovate the Glass Barn café. The couple then took out a rent and repair lease on Ulva House, which had become derelict, and are converting it into a seven-room hotel. In 2025, they took over operation of The Boathouse with a partner. Their renovation of the mansion was the subject of a 6-part BBC series, Banjo and Ro's Grand Island Hotel, aired in January 2026. A hostel opened in 2023, and there are two bothies with no electricity, but as of July 2026 the hotel has yet to open. The TV coverage and the popularity of The Boathouse have led to increased numbers of tourists to the island, and in late May 2026, the operator of the Ulva ferry announced that to relieve pressure on the residents and parking pressure near the ferry terminal on Mull, the ferry would not run on Sundays, and The Boathouse would also be closed on Sundays.

== Wildlife ==
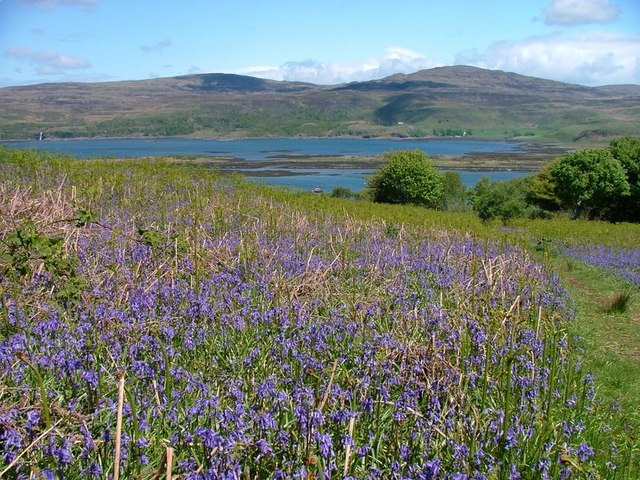
Bluebells growing near Ardalum

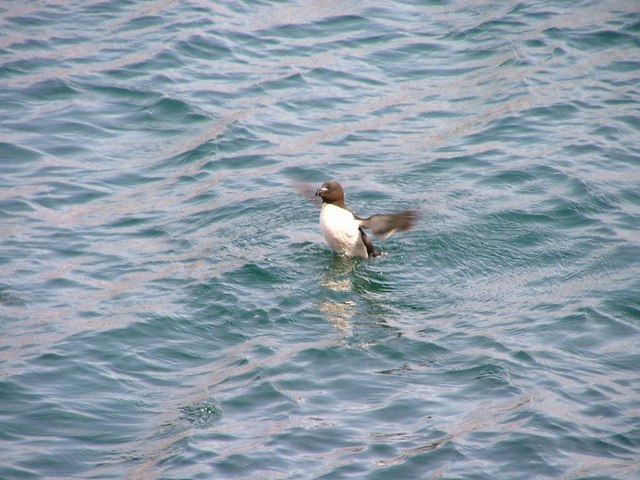
A young razorbill in nearby Loch na Keal/Loch nan Ceall

=== Fauna ===
Ulva is known for its wildlife, which as is usual for many Scottish islands, includes many varieties of seabirds. A number of raptors breed on the island including buzzards and golden eagles. Game birds include snipe, grouse, pheasant, and woodcock. White-tailed eagles, which were reintroduced in the nearby Island of Rùm have migrated to Mull, where they now have a stronghold - they can occasionally be seen on Ulva, but are not known to nest there. Ravens also breed here. Puffin, black-legged kittiwakes, shag, common and Arctic tern, gannets, eider ducks, oystercatchers, curlews, redshanks, red-breasted mergansers and gulls nest on the island and the surrounding waters provide a livelihood for numerous seabirds. Occasional visitors (usually not breeding) include - house martins, Leach's storm petrel, corncrakes (which are rare in the British Isles), peregrine falcons and spotted flycatchers.

Land mammals that can be found on the island, include red deer, rabbits, and mountain hares. Stoats and hedgehogs are occasionally sighted on the island as well. In 1986 the island's otters were studied by experts from the University of Leeds - in the six weeks that they were there, they sighted the otters every evening. In regard to canids, there are no foxes on the island, although it has been suggested that the name "Ulva" - wolf isle - meant that wolves lived on the island in the Norse period.

There is only one known kind of reptile on the island, the pseudo-snake slowworm, but no true snakes have been reported. The name "Ormaig", however, is probably a corruption of the Norse Ormrsvi, which means "bay of the worm" - this may refer to a snake.

Cetaceans that can be seen in the surrounding waters include minke whales, porpoises, dolphins, and pilot whales. Whales occasionally get beached on the island, more recent examples including 1966 (pilot), 1987 (pilot) and 1991 (two sperm whales). Grey seals and basking shark also frequent the area.

Ulva is also home to two extremely rare insects: the Scotch burnet moth, which can also be found on Mull, but nowhere else, and a dragonfly, Orthetrum coesilesceus.

=== Flora ===
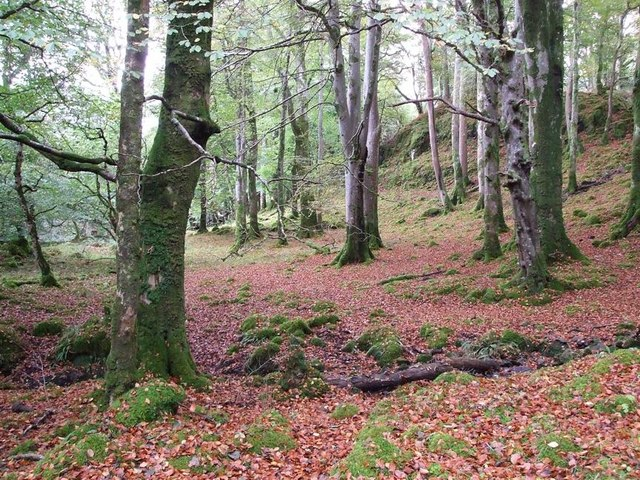
The Isle of Ulva has a dramatic range of scenery from spectacular cliffs to sylvan glades such as this.

More than 500 species of plant have been recorded on Ulva.

Bracken is particularly abundant on the island, with heather growing in some other parts. Wild flowers that grow here include Hyacinthoides non-scripta ('common' or 'British' bluebells), Campanula rotundifolia ('bluebells of Scotland' or 'harebells'), orchids, sundews (Drosera) and Dianthus ("pinks").

Much of the island is treeless, but there are substantial stands in some places, especially near the island's small reservoir.

However, in the areas where trees grow, there is a surprising diversity. There are at least 43 varieties and/or species of broadleaf trees on the island, and over a dozen types of conifer. Amongst the coniferous trees are silver and noble firs, juniper, European and Japanese larch, Sitka spruce, and Scots pine. The broadleafs include laburnum, wych elm, three types of oak, four kinds of cherry tree, alder, sycamore, sweet chestnut, walnut and various other fruit trees.

== In literature and the arts ==
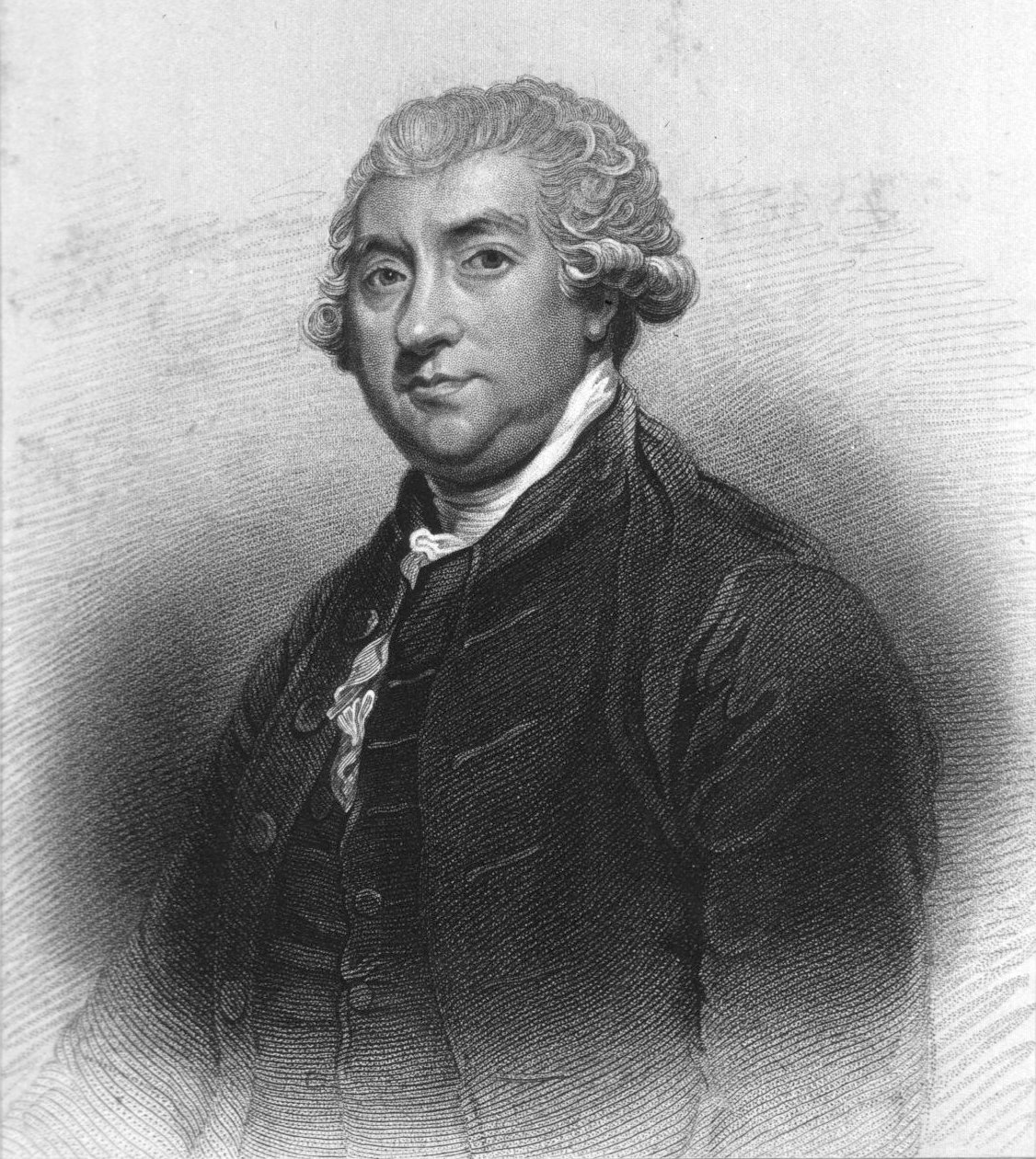
James Boswell

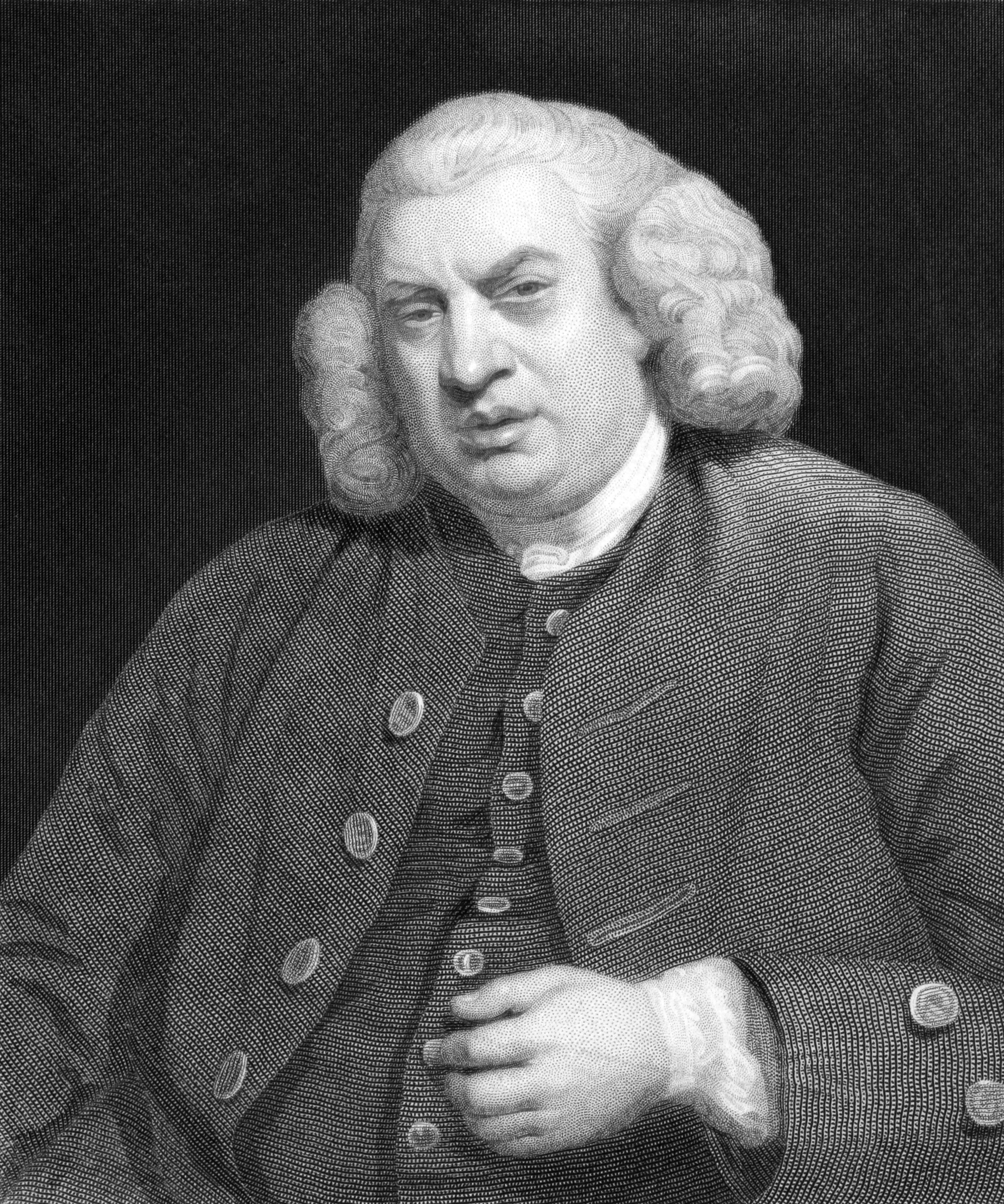
Samuel Johnson painted circa 1772, a year before his visit to Ulva

=== Boswell and Johnson ===
Dr Johnson and Boswell visited The MacQuarrie on Ulva in October 1773, the year after Sir Joseph Banks brought Staffa to the English-speaking world's attention. Perhaps aware that Banks considered that the columnar basalt cliff formations on Ulva called "The Castles" rivalled Staffa's Johnson wrote:

When the islanders were reproached with their ignorance or insensibility of the wonders of Staffa, they had not much to reply. They had indeed considered it little, because they had always seen it; and none but philosophers, nor they always, are struck with wonder otherwise than by novelty.

Both men left separate accounts of the visit, Johnson in A Journey to the Western Islands of Scotland (18 January 1775) and Boswell in Journal of a Tour to the Hebrides with Samuel Johnson, LL.D (1785). They arrived on Saturday, 16 October, and left the following day.

=== Scott and Hogg ===
James Hogg, "The Ettrick Shepherd"

London poet John Keats was one of many famous visitors to Ulva in the 19th century.

Boswell and Johnson were not the only famous non-Highland visitors to the island. Walter Scott and James Hogg also visited the islands some decades later. Scott was struck by the contrast between Ulva and the nearby island of Inchkenneth:

... a most beautiful islet of the most verdant green, while all the neighbouring shore of Greban, as well as the large islands of Colinsay and Ulva, are as black as heath can make them. But Ulva has a good anchorage, and Inchkenneth is surrounded by shoals.

By the time, Scott visited the "mean" house referred to in Boswell's journal was gone, and replaced by one from a design by Robert Adam. This in turn has been destroyed, and the current Ulva House is on its site.

Hogg wrote some graffiti on the wall of Ulva Inn, now lost due to its burning down in 1880:

I've roamed around the creeks and headlands of Mull,
Their fields are uncultured and cussedly weedy,
Their hard lands are bare and their havens dull,
Their folks may be brave, but they're cussedly greedy.

Many other visitors to neighbouring Staffa stayed at Ulva Inn, this included Keats, Mendelssohn, and William Wordsworth.

After his visit, Walter Scott used Ulva as material for various works, for example, in his 1815 poem, Lord of the Isles (Canto 4)

And Ulva dark, and Colonsay,
And all the group of islets gay
That guard famed Staffa round.

In Tales of a Grandfather, Scott tells the story of "Alan-a-Sop". In his youth, Alan-a-Sop was treated badly by his stepfather, one Maclean of Torloisk. He grew up to be a pirate and eventually took a bloody revenge on Torloisk with the help of MacQuarrie of Ulva.

=== Other ===
A piper named MacArthur set up a famous piping school on Ulva, possibly in the 17th century. He himself was trained by the great MacCrimmon dynasty of Skye, whose piping skills were legendary in Gaeldom. The MacArthurs themselves were said to be amongst the greatest bagpipers to come out of Scotland.

The Scottish missionary and explorer of Africa, David Livingstone recounted how his ancestors had originally come from Ulva.

Our great-grandfather fell at the battle of Culloden, fighting for the old line of kings; and our grandfather was a small farmer in Ulva, where my father was born.

The most famous commemoration of Ulva in literature is Thomas Campbell's poem, Lord Ullin's Daughter, written after the writer had visited the region. The opening two stanzas are as follows:

A CHIEFTAIN to the Highlands bound
Cries, "Boatman, do not tarry!
And I'll give thee a silver pound
To row us o'er the ferry!"

"Now who be ye would cross Lochgyle,
This dark and stormy water?"
"O I'm the chief of Ulva's isle,
And this, Lord Ullin's daughter.

Moladh Ulbha (In Praise of Ulva) is a song written by the Ulbhach Bard, Colin Fletcher (Cailean Mac an Fhleisdeir). It was transcribed by the Rev. MacKenzie. This is the first verse.

Mi 'nam shuidhe 'n seo leam fhèin
Smaoinich mi gun innsinn sgeul
Na làithean sona bh' agam fhèin
Nuair bha mi òg an Ulbha

Translation:

Me sitting here by myself
I thought I'd tell a story,
The happy days I had myself
'hen I was young in Ulva

John MacCormick (Scottish Gaelic: Iain MacCormaig; 1870–1947), the author of the first full length Scottish Gaelic novel, Dùn Aluinn (1912) was an occasional visitor to the island. He wrote a number of short stories, non-fiction and a novella. He came from Mull, and was a distant relative of the politician of the same name and Neil MacCormick

English children's writer, Beatrix Potter (1866–1943) also visited Ulva from time to time. She was a relative of the Clark family, and The Tale of Mr. Tod (1912) is dedicated to F. W. Clark (III - grandson of the man who bought the island). The dedication says rather cryptically: "FOR FRANCIS WILLIAM OF ULVA — SOMEDAY!" Although the main characters of the book are a fox (tod) and a badger (brock), neither species can be found on Ulva.

== Structures ==
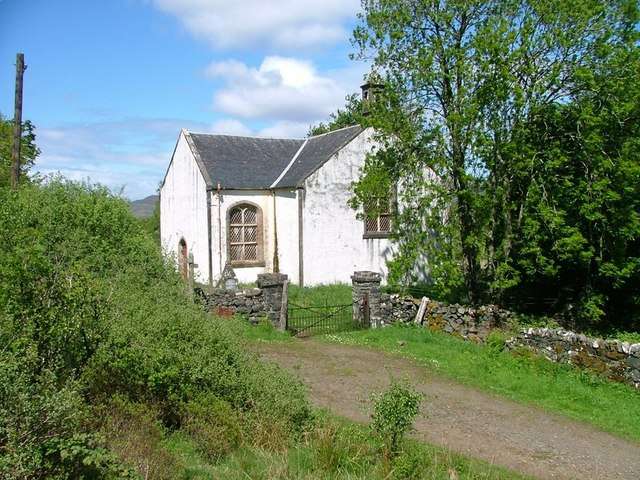
The small church at Ardalum, designed by Thomas Telford

Many structures on Ulva are in ruins, such as the former water mill between Ormaig and Cragaig, and if not in ruins, they have been incorporated into other buildings, e.g. Bracadale Steadings, which includes bits of the old Ulva House which Boswell and Johnson stayed in. On the southern coast are found the ruins of the hamlet of Ormaig (walls of old cottages) and of Kilvekewen church.

=== Ulva Church ===
In the early 19th century, an unflattering report stated: "No district was more deficient in the means of religious instruction than Ulva" and that "Divine service was little frequented in winter."

A small church was built at Ardalum between 1827 and 1828. It cost £1,500 and was designed by Thomas Telford. It was restored in 1921. the original church did not have a proper floor, and its floor boards were laid on top of the earth.

The Certificate of Complete of the Ulva Church and Manse is dated 14 March 1828, and it was conveyed by Charles MacQuarie. There was a budget of £1,500 for the construction and the actual cost came to £1,495 14/1.

Privately owned since the mid 1950s when it was purchased by the family who then owned the island, it is still used, partly as a community centre, and the north-west wing for worship at least twice a year, at Easter and at Harvest time. (The island was sold to the residents in 1998 however, and the building is now owned by that small group.) It is claimed that in 1847 (Statistical Account), everyone on the island attended services in it including one Roman Catholic and one atheist. Dr Johnson was probably speaking of the old church at Cille Mhic Eòghainn when he said: "Ulva was not neglected by the piety of ardent times: it has still to show what was once a church." Ulva Church is dedicated to St Eòghann of Ardstraw, possibly the same person.

The last resident minister, Rev. MacKenzie left in 1929.

=== Sheila's Cottage ===
"Sheila's Cottage" is a thatched but and ben, which was restored in the 1990s. It is named for Sheila MacFadyen (Sile NicPhaidein), who lived in the cottage between the turn of the 20th century and the early 1950s. Sheila was originally a milkmaid at Ulva House, but she spent her later years, after her son predeceased her, garnering a scanty living by gathering and selling winkles for sale locally. One room, the "but" was for livestock, and the other, the "ben" was her living space, where all activities took place.

The cottage contains a box bed, dresser, and a life-size model of Sheila herself.

An additional restoration of the cottage was being completed in late 2019.

=== Other buildings ===
The Inn at Ulva was popular with visitors to Staffa. However, although it called itself a "temperance inn", its keeper was charged three times with breach of licence. It burnt down in 1880 – the buildings were thatched, and the guest book, which contained many famous signatures was destroyed with it. It reopened, but was finally closed in 1905.

More than one building has gone by the name "Ulva House", and the current one was designed by Leslie Grahame Thomson in the early 1950s. There is a dovecot and a pig sty on its gable end. The Ulva master plan called for converting the house into self catering flats, but instead there are plans for a boutique hotel.

There are several ruined kilns on the island for a number of different purposes. At Baligartan, there is the remains of a kiln for drying grain, and on the south shore, in a gully (GR173378), there is another, which was probably used in the island's old kelp industry.

== Folklore and customs ==
It may be presumed that much of the island's folklore disappeared with the island's population. The story of "Allan-a-Sop", adapted by Scott would have formed part.

Bradley's Cave (G 439398) is named for an Irish itinerant who used to visit in the 19th century. Bradley, or O' Brolligan (as his name is sometimes recorded) was a retired sailor, who took to the roads as a pedlar, and when on Ulva, he was said to live in this cave. Though there is little evidence of his existence, during the 20th century, buttons and a coin dated 1873 were found in here.

Cairistiona's Rock near Ormaig has a more gruesome story attached to it. Cairistiona accused, probably falsely, her sister of stealing a large hunk of cheese, and tried to extract a confession from her, by lowering her off a cliff with a plaid tied round her neck. The plaid slipped, and ended up strangling her sister, which she had never intended to do. Wracked with remorse, she confessed to the accident, but this was not enough for the islanders, who decided to drown her, by throwing her in a sack and laying her on the rock, which still bears her name.

=== Mercheta Mulierum ===
Mercheta Mulierum was an ancient custom persisting in the island:

Inquiring after the reliques of former manners, I found that in Ulva, and, I think, no where else, is continued the payment of the Mercheta Mulierum; a fine in old times due to the Laird at the marriage of a virgin. The original of this claim, as of our tenure of Borough English, is variously delivered. It is pleasant to find ancient customs in old families. This payment, like others, was, for want of money, made anciently in the produce of the land. Macquarry was used to demand a sheep, for which he now takes a crown, by that inattention to the uncertain proportion between the value and the denomination of money, which has brought much disorder into Europe. A sheep has always the same power of supplying human wants, but a crown will bring at one time more, at another less.

— Johnson

Boswell said "I suppose, Ulva is the only place where this custom remains", and Sir William Blackstone says in his Commentaries on the Laws of England that "he cannot find that ever this custom [Borough English] prevailed in England".

Walter Scott claimed that mercheta mulierum persisted at the time of his visit.

== See also ==
- List of islands of Scotland
