= Ulva Ferry =

Hamlet on the Isle of Mull, Scotland

Coordinates: 56.484°N 6.141°W

Ulva Ferry: Scottish Gaelic: Caolas Ulbha
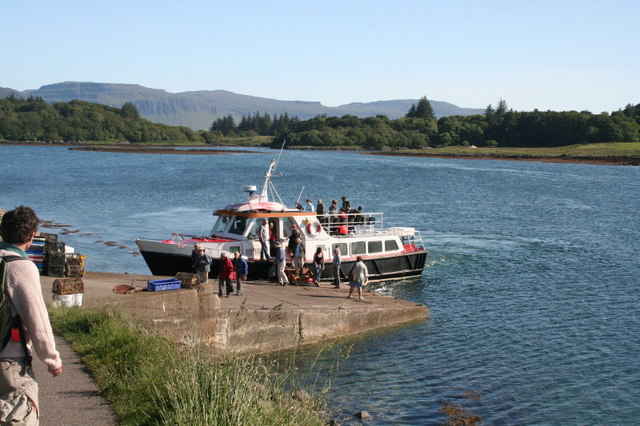
- Ulva Ferry, with the Isle of Ulva in the background

- Location within Argyll and Bute
- OS grid reference: NM445398
- Council area: Argyll and Bute
- Lieutenancy area: Argyll and Bute
- Country: Scotland
- Sovereign state: United Kingdom
- Post town: ISLE OF MULL
- Postcode district: PA73
- Dialling code: 01688
- Police: Scotland
- Fire: Scottish
- Ambulance: Scottish
- UK Parliament: Argyll, Bute and South Lochaber
- Scottish Parliament: Argyll and Bute

Ulva Ferry (Scottish Gaelic: Caolas Ulbha) is a hamlet and ferry port on the Hebridean island of Mull, on the Ulva Sound at the west of the island.

== Etymology ==
Ulva Ferry is on the shore of the Ulva Sound and in English is named for the ferry that connects Mull and the island of Ulva (Ulbha), while in Gaelic the hamlet is named Caolas Ulbha, for the Ulva Sound itself.

== Port ==
The hamlet contains a port from which the Ulva Ferry travels between Mull and Ulva, operated as a privately run ferry which travels throughout the day on demand by ferryman Rhuri Munro. There is an 8-berth pontoon at the port, and from it, boat trips to the Treshnish Isles, Staffa, and Iona are run by private companies.

== Development ==
Ulva Primary School, despite the name suggesting it primarily serves Ulva, is one of the few primary schools on Mull, and is not located on Ulva itself. The Mull and Iona Community Trust has raised funds to build new houses to support the school, and as a result, there are 15 primary-age children in Ulva Ferry as of August 2021.

== Transport ==
Outwith the ferry to Ulva, no public transport runs to or from Ulva Ferry.
