= Kilfinichen and Kilvickeon =

Civil parish on Isle of Mull, Scotland

Coordinates: 56°18′59″N 6°14′3″W

Kilfinichen & Kilvickeon: Scottish Gaelic: Cill Fhionnchain & Cill Mhic Eóghainn
- Civil parish
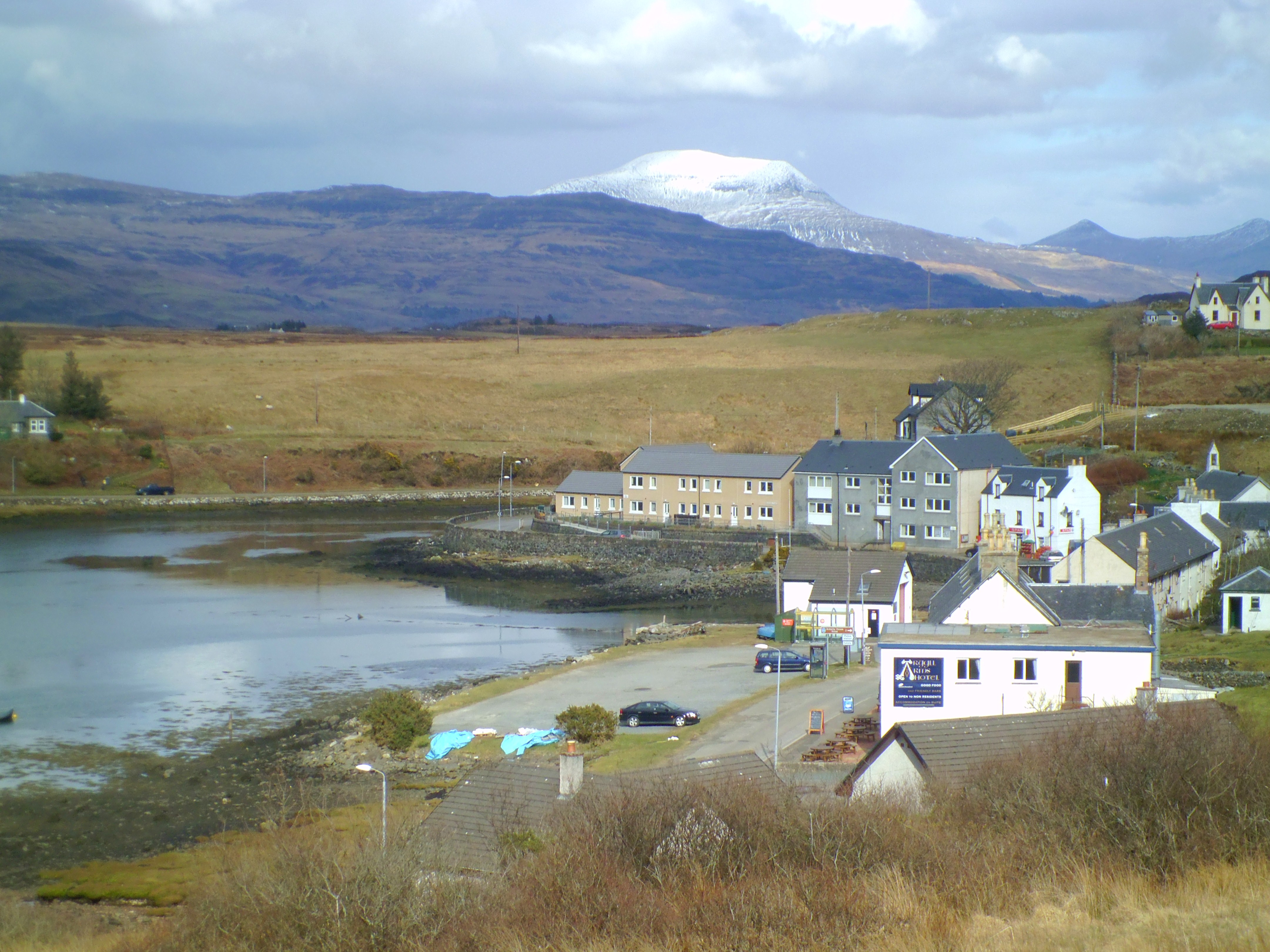
- Bunessan, in Ross of Mull, with snow-capped Ben More in the distance

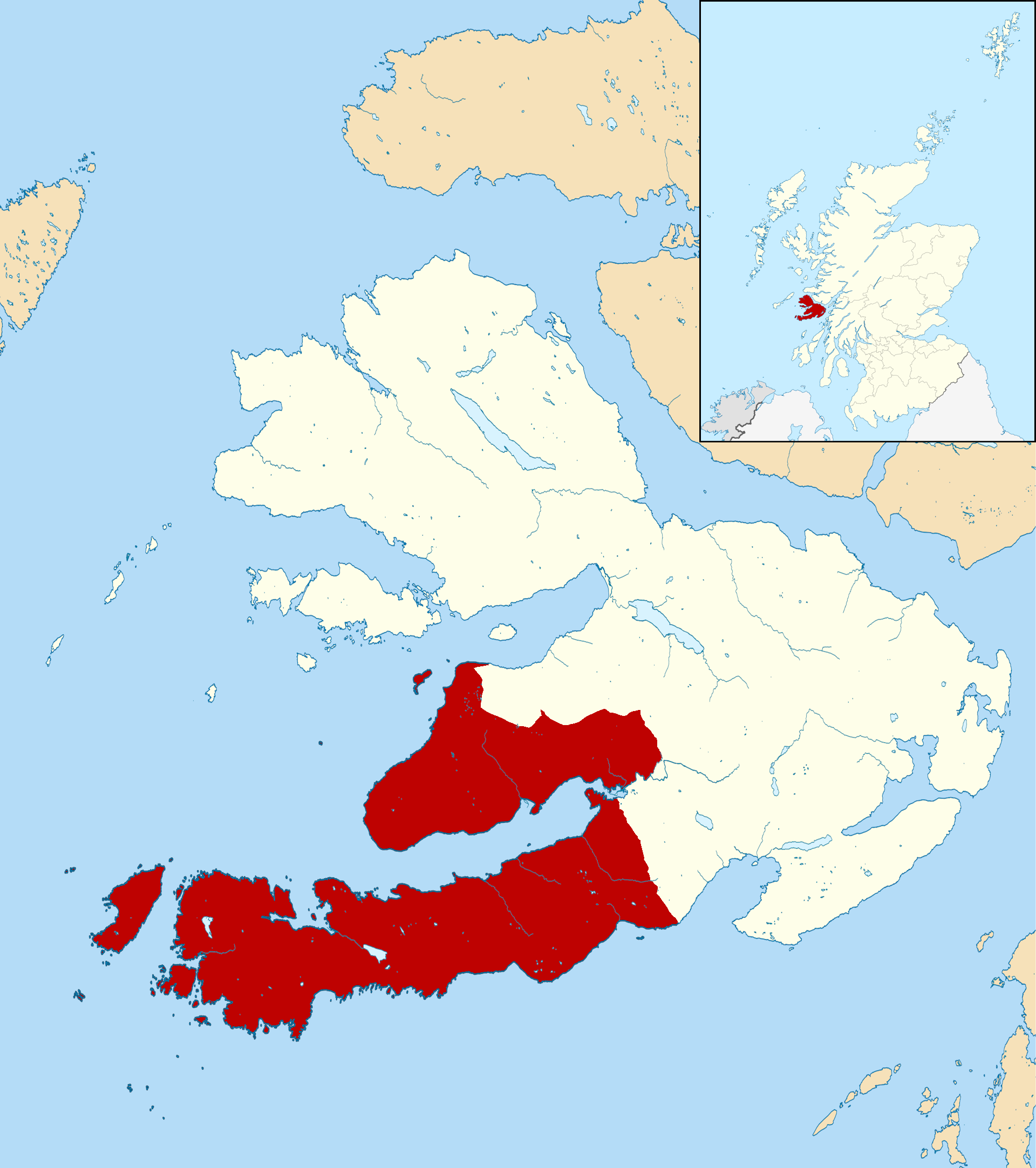
- Map of Kilfinichen and Kilvickeon within Mull
- Area: 95.2 sq mi (247 km^{2})
- Population: 745 (2011)
  - Density: 8/sq mi (3.1/km^{2})
- OS grid reference: NM717371
- Civil parish: Kilfinichen and Kilvickeon
- Council area: Argyll and Bute
- Lieutenancy area: Argyll and Bute
- Country: Scotland
- Sovereign state: United Kingdom
- Post town: ISLE OF MULL
- Postcode district: PA65
- Dialling code: 01680
- Police: Scotland
- Fire: Scottish
- Ambulance: Scottish
- UK Parliament: Argyll, Bute and South Lochaber
- Scottish Parliament: Argyll and Bute

Parishes of the Isle of Mull (1891)Kilfinichen and Kilvickeon shown in yellow (and labelled 9)

Kilfinichen and Kilvickeon is a civil parish on the Isle of Mull in the county of Argyll, Scotland, part of the Argyll and Bute council area. It is one of three parishes on the island and extends over the south-western part and includes the islands of Iona, Erraid and Inch Kenneth. It is bordered by the parish of Torosay in the north and east. It extends about 23 miles (37 kilometres) north-east to south-west and is 18 miles (29 kilometres) wide.

== Etymology ==
The name Kilfinichen means in Gaelic St. Finichen (or Findchan), one of St. Columba’s monks. Kilvickeon or Cill Mhich Eòghainn (Gaelic spelling) translates as church of son of Eòghainn (MacEwan). The parish derives its name from the two places of worship. Although Mull had numerous parishes before the Reformation, afterwards these were amalgamated into one Parish of Mull, including Iona and Inch Kenneth. Later, in 1688, the parish was divided at the narrow isthmus near Aros Castle, with north Mull becoming the new parish of Kilninian and Kilmore. Forty years later (c.1728), south Mull was divided into two parishes. These were named after the location of places of worship in their areas, rather than inheriting names directly from pre-reformation parishes.

== History ==
There were two churches in the parish, one in Ross, and the other in Ardmeanach, both of which were erected in 1804. Also, in 1828 a separate church was built in Iona, which became a separate ‘’quoad sacra’’ (ecclesiastical only) parish, under the Church Building (Scotland) Act 1824 (5 Geo. 4. c. 90). The main parish church of Kilfinichen and Kilvickeon, in Bunessan, has a plain oblong style. It underwent repairs in 1828. It replaced the old church of Kilvickeon, which lies three miles (4.8 km) to the south-east, near Loch Assapol. This church dates from the 13th century and continued in use until the new church was built, but by 1795 was in a ruinous state.

The church of Kilfinichen, which is in Ardmeanach, on Kilfinichen bay, was built in 1804 to replace the medieval church building, whose remains are one-quarter mile (0.40 km) to the east. The present church building has a simple gabled design. After it was built, it held about one third of the church services of the parish, with most of the remainder taking place at the Bunessan church. But since 1998 it has been a private residence.

== Geography ==
The parish physically consists of four separate areas: Ardmeanach, Ross, Iona, and Brolas. Ardmeanach, the middle of the three west-facing peninsulas in Mull. This is separated from the rest of the parish by Loch Scridain. South of this loch is the southern-most of the three peninsulas, named Ross (Gaelic for promontory). West of Ross is the island of Iona, which is about one mile (1.6 km) offshore. The district of Brolas lies in the eastern part of the peninsula, which joins to the main part of Mull. It is separated from Ross proper by a range of low-lying hills.

The main offshore islands are Iona, Erraid and Inch Kenneth. Further out are the Torran Rocks and the Dubh Artach lighthouse, which are also within the civil parish.

Loch na Lathaich is a small sea loch indenting the southern shore of Loch Scridain, on which lie Bunessan and Ardtun On the north side of Loch Scridain, the headland of Burg, in Ardmeanach, was a detached part of the parish of Torosay until 1891 (1,307 acres (2 sq mi; 5 km^{2})). On the north side of Ardmeanach is the highest peak of Mull, Ben More (3,169 ft (966 m)), on the watershed across Ardmeanach which forms the border with Torosay. There are some inconsiderable freshwater lochs in Ross, but one, Loch Assapol, has been enlarged by a dam and is used as source of drinking water.

== Demographics ==
At the 2011 census, the population of the civil parish was 745. 11.7% had some knowledge of Gaelic. In 1891 89.8% were Gaelic speaking. Of the islands, Iona had a population of 177, Erraid 6 and Inch Kenneth none. The village of Bunessan (with adjoining lower and upper Ardtun) had a population of 180 in 2011. The area of the parish is 60,937 acres (95.2 mi^{2}; 246.6 km^{2}).

== Administration ==
The parish council was formed in 1895 with 7 elected members. This was replaced by Mull District Council in 1930, which had 6 members, 3 of whom were the County Councillors for Mull and 3 elected to the District Council from wards based on the three parishes. Since 1976 there has been an Isle of Mull community council. Iona has a separate community council.

At present, church services are held at Iona, Creich and Bunessan, for the united parish called “Iona linked with Kilfinichen and Kilvickeon and the Ross of Mull”. The church at Creich opened in 1899. At the time, the “quoad sacra” parish of Iona also included Fidden, Knockvologan, Pottie, Catchean and Creich in the Ross of Mull. A subsidiary church was established for the convenience of the people of that area.

== Landmarks ==
- Camas
- Dubh Artach
- Iona Abbey
- St Kenneth's Chapel

== Settlements ==
- Ardtun
- Bunessan
- Fionnphort
- Iona
- Knockan
- Kintra
- Pennyghael
- Uisken

== See also ==
- Kilninian and Kilmore
- Torosay
