= Knockan =

Settlement on the Isle of Mull, Scotland

Coordinates: 56.333°N 6.2°W

Knockan: Scottish Gaelic: An Cnocan
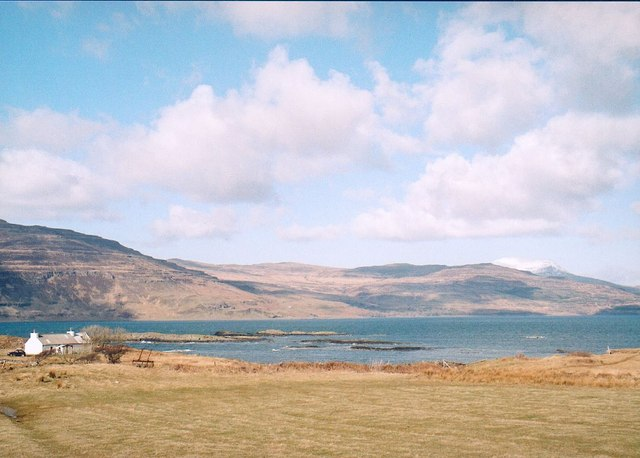
- Coastal scene, looking towards Loch Scridain

- Location within Argyll and Bute
- OS grid reference: NM4023
- Council area: Argyll and Bute
- Lieutenancy area: Argyll and Bute
- Country: Scotland
- Sovereign state: United Kingdom
- Post town: ISLE OF MULL
- Postcode district: PA67
- Police: Scotland
- Fire: Scottish
- Ambulance: Scottish
- UK Parliament: Argyll, Bute and South Lochaber
- Scottish Parliament: Argyll and Bute

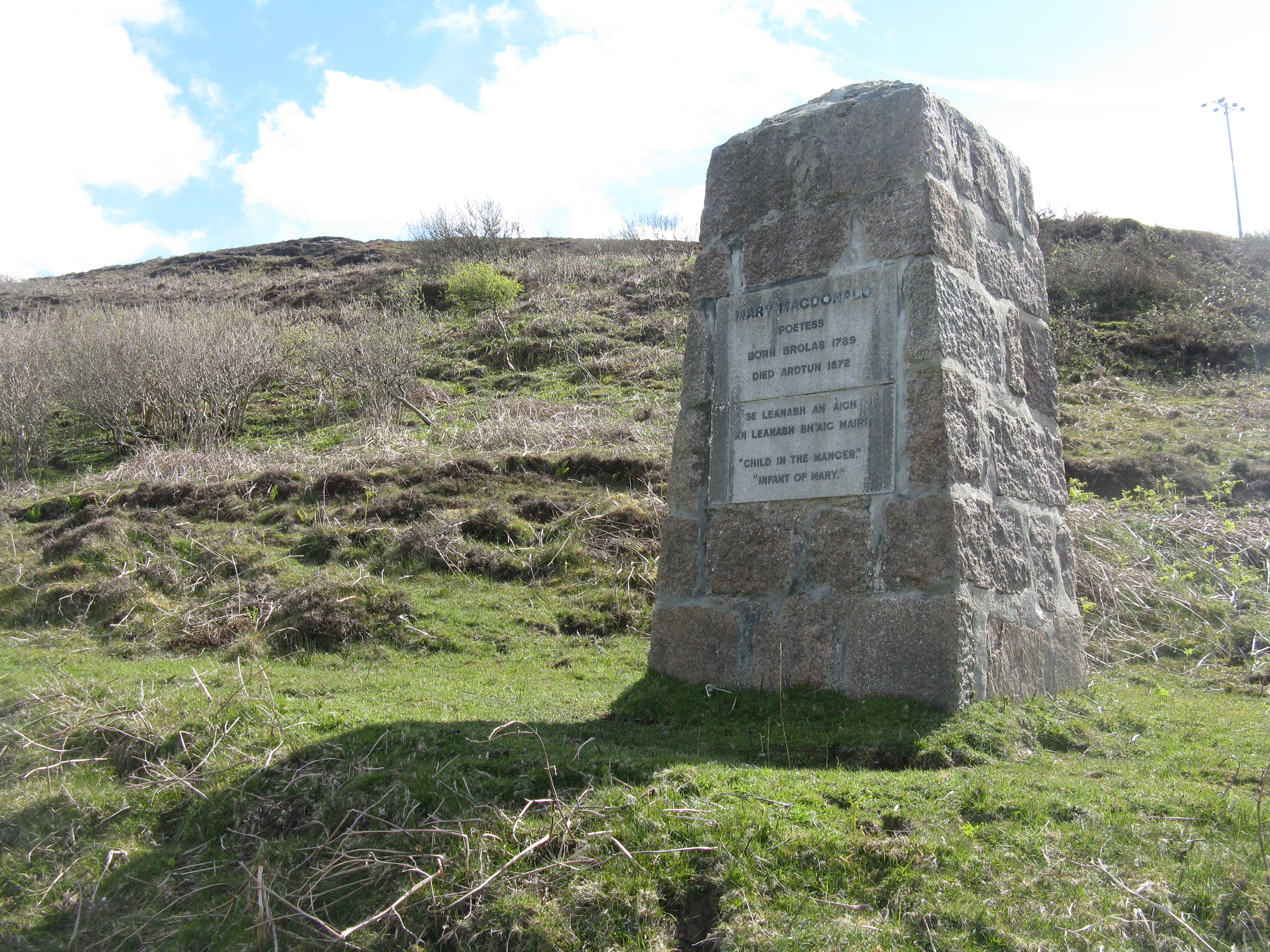
Mary MacDonald of nearby Ardtun wrote the Gaelic words to a hymn, which became an English favourite called "Child in a Manger". The traditional Gaelic tune she used, (later called "Bunessan") was re-used in 1931 for "Morning Has Broken". Her monument is beside the main road at Knockan

Knockan (Scottish Gaelic: An Cnocan) is a township of six crofts in the community of Ardtun, in the south of the Isle of Mull off the west coast of Scotland.

Cnocan in Gaelic means "little hill". The cottage called "Knockan" is distinguished by its bright red roof and white walls, set by a small hill. It is around 200 years old and was originally built by a weaver of the local crofting community. It is now owned by his descendants, the family of Donald Black. The other crofting cottages in the "township" of Knockan include "Knockan House" and "Rhudda na Cruban"

Knockan is situated on an unclassified road, north of its junction with the A849. The A849 is the main route across southern Mull, travelling from Salen to Fionnphort, via Craignure.
