= Aridhglas =

Hamlet near Fionnphort on Isle of Mull, Scotland

Coordinates: 56.32°N 06.35°W

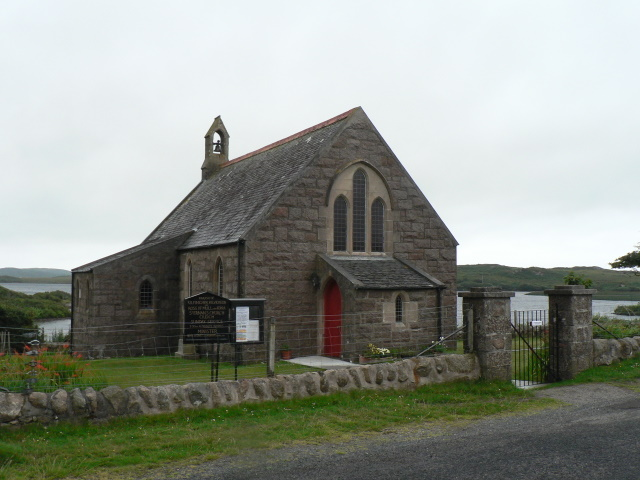
- Creich church

- Location within Argyll and Bute
- OS grid reference: NM3123
- Civil parish: Kilfinichen and Kilvickeon
- Council area: Argyll and Bute
- Lieutenancy area: Argyll and Bute
- Country: Scotland
- Sovereign state: United Kingdom
- Post town: ISLE OF MULL
- Postcode district: PA65
- Dialling code: 01680
- Police: Scotland
- Fire: Scottish
- Ambulance: Scottish
- UK Parliament: Argyll, Bute and South Lochaber
- Scottish Parliament: Argyll and Bute

Aridhglas is a village (or hamlet) on the Ross of Mull, Isle of Mull in Argyll and Bute, Scotland. Creich Hall (former primary school), Creich War memorial and Creich Church (St. Ernan's) are located in or around the settlement. Aridhglass is one mile (1.6 km) east of Fionnphort (the port for Iona) on the road to Bunessan, at the junction with the road to Kintra.

In the 19th century Creich was an area sustained by Crofting. In 1871, the district of Creich contained the farms of Aridhglas, Creich, Dearg Phort, Braighcreich and the village of Kintra.

When the “quoad sacra” parish of Iona was established in 1828, it not only consisted of the island, but also Fidden, Knockvologan, Pottie, Catchean and Creich in the Ross of Mull. All of this church parish of Iona remained in the civil parish of Kilfinichen and Kilvickeon. Then, in 1899, for the convenient of their parishioners in Ross, the church in Iona opened a subsidiary church in the district of Creich. Services are still held there by the now combined parish of Iona linked with Kilfinichen and Kilvickeon and the Ross of Mull.
