= Pennyghael =

Village on the Isle of Mull, Scotland

Coordinates: 56.364°N 6.020°W

Pennyghael: Scottish Gaelic: Peighinn nan Gàidheal
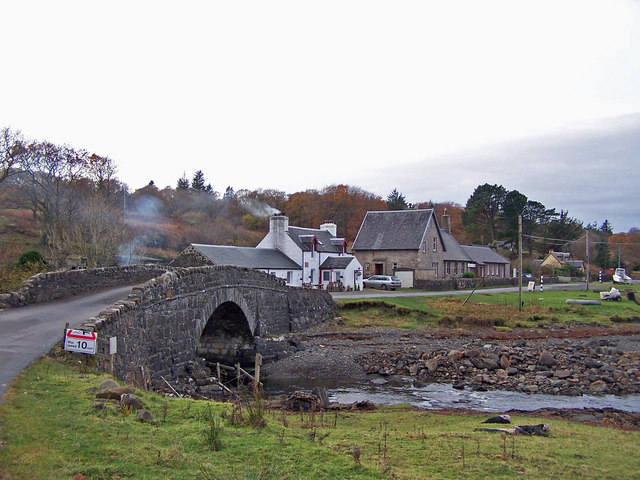
- The white building is 'The Old Smithy', with the Pennyghael Community Hall behind

- Location within Argyll and Bute
- OS grid reference: NM517263
- Council area: Argyll and Bute
- Lieutenancy area: Argyll and Bute
- Country: Scotland
- Sovereign state: United Kingdom
- Post town: ISLE OF MULL
- Postcode district: PA67
- Dialling code: 01681
- Police: Scotland
- Fire: Scottish
- Ambulance: Scottish
- UK Parliament: Argyll, Bute and South Lochaber
- Scottish Parliament: Argyll and Bute

Pennyghael (Scottish Gaelic: Peighinn nan Gàidheal) is a small village in the Ross of Mull, Argyll and Bute, Scotland. It is located along the A849 road aligned along the coast line of Ross, on Loch Scridain in southwestern Mull, along the road to Bunessan. The Leidle River passes to the west of the village into the Loch.

== Geography ==
The village is approached from the west over a small bridge across the Leidle River, known as Pennyghael Bridge. The A849 rubble bridge contains a single arch and dates to 1835–6. The Pennyghael Estate covers roughly 10,000 acres (4,000 ha) and extends to the sea cliffs at Carsaig Bay and from Kinloch in the east to Aird Fada in the west.

Pennyghael has a weather observation station which is equipped with Simple Auroral Magnetometer, thermometer and hygrometer which are enclosed in a small Stevenson Screen and fixed on the wall of the observatory building here.

== History ==
There is an inference that the name of the country could have derived from the usage “The Pennyland of the Gael", when land was valued in terms of penny or fraction of a penny.

Ancient history of Pennyghael is traced to Neolithic cairns found at Burg, which links the county to 4000BC when people lived here. When the Iron Age started, farmers worked around the shores of Loch Scridain in around 600 BC. In the first century AD, the Norwegians and Danes invaded the county, evidence for which is still noted from some of the names inherited from them. The presence of Clan MacGillivray during the fourth century AD is inferred as the period in 327 AD when King Colla da Crioch and 350 Irish clan chiefs had migrated to the Western Isles. By the start of the 1390s, Clan MacLean of Duart had control over the place. The first Laird of Pennyghael, as officially recorded in 1542, was Archibald McGillivray (1510-1565). In 1608, Pennyghael was chartered by Duart to Neil McGillivray.

The MacGillivrays were the dominant family in the village for centuries. Donald MacGillivray was laird of Pennyghael in 1618. Rev. Martin MacGillivray was of the area in 1631–50. By 1701, one John MacGillivray is mentioned, and in 1751, there was n Alexander MacGillivray associated with Pennyghael. They lived in a house here which was located to the south of the island Mul and which formed the western entrance to Loch Linnhe. In 1701, the local reverend was the Reverend Martin MacGillivray; his nephew, John MacGillivray was laird at the time. Alexander MacGillivray was laird of Pennyghael in 1751. Descendants of the clan may exist but the family line of the Pennyghael family is much less clear than that of the Dunmaglass family.

Pennyghael is also very significant to modern Scottish Gaelic literature; in 1911, Catriona (Katie) MacDonald, whose father owned the Kinloch Hotel, emigrated to Pretoria, in the Union of South Africa, to become the wife and Muse of highly important 20th-century Gaelic Bard and fellow Mull native Duncan Livingstone. They were never to have children, however. Catriona Livingstone died in September 1951 and Duncan, who adored her, never recovered from the blow. In response, he composed the poem Cràdh, which Derick Thomson later dubbed, "a fine lament... for his wife."

Pennyghael Development Association (PDA) was established in 2000 as a charitable institution, and in 2005 its objective was to acquire the building of Old School in Pennyghael and restart it for which funds were raised from the community. The PDA also had plans to develop a community centre.

== Notable landmarks ==
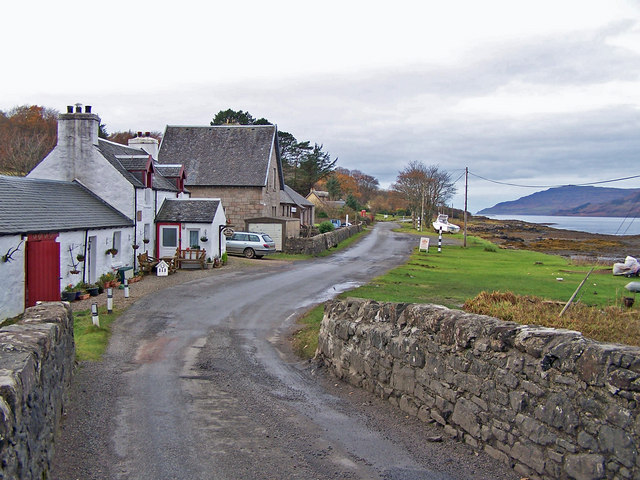
Pennyghael

Pennyghael Community Hall is a tall-roofed building. Pennycross School, of square pink granite, dates to 1872. There is a stone cross monument located about 80 metres (260 ft) north of Pennyghael House. Known as the Crois an Ollaimh, it is rough-cut and of Latin type.

The white building, Smithy House (also The Old Smithy), is used as a guest house. The early 19th century Kinloch Hotel, a three bay gabled inn, lies 3 kilometres (1.9 mi) to the northeast. Also nearby is the Pennyghael Hotel, to the south of the Island Mul, noted as a "delightful, six-room country hotel set in a 17th-century farmhouse near the head of Loch Scridain, about halfway between Craignure and Fionnphort;" all rooms have views of Loch Scridain or Ben More, and two rooms provide views of white tailed eagle nest also. The restaurant in the hotel serves dishes of crab, mussels, pork and Tobermory cheeses. The now abandoned Pennyghael Lodge was built in the 18th century, extended 1816–19, and expanded in the 1920s, while the circa early 19th century Rossal Farm is a two-storey building which had restoration work in the 1980s. The nearby Carsaig Estate and surrounding area was the location for the film The Silent Storm.

== Fauna ==
The estate is noted for its two families of otters (on the northern shore) and a seal colony on the reef of Killunaig. Also seen here are red deer (in the moors), peregrine falcons, sea and golden eagles, ravens, hen harriers, wild goats, and others.

Avifauna species recorded in Pennyghael and in the surrounding region are: meadow pipits, and rock pipits, northern wheatears; seabirds such great black-backed gull, lesser black-backed gull, common gulls, northern gannets, shearwaters; raptors, buzzards, and golden eagles on the Carsaig hills; the Loch has eider, black guillemot, common guillemot, black-throated divers, red-throated divers, great-northern divers and also otters; common redstart, common chaffinch, European greenfinch, common blackbirds and many species of woodland birds; shore birds oystercatcher, curlew and many species of gull near Burg and Tiroran; barn swallows near often barns and outbuildings; common sandpiper, eider ducks, northern lapwing, and common whitethroat around the Loch; species seen in the Loch Beg are European oystercatcher, Eurasian curlew, and many water birds, redshank and common ringed plover; and in the forested areas eared owls are also recorded.
