= Ardmeanach =

Native name: Ard Meanach (Scottish Gaelic)
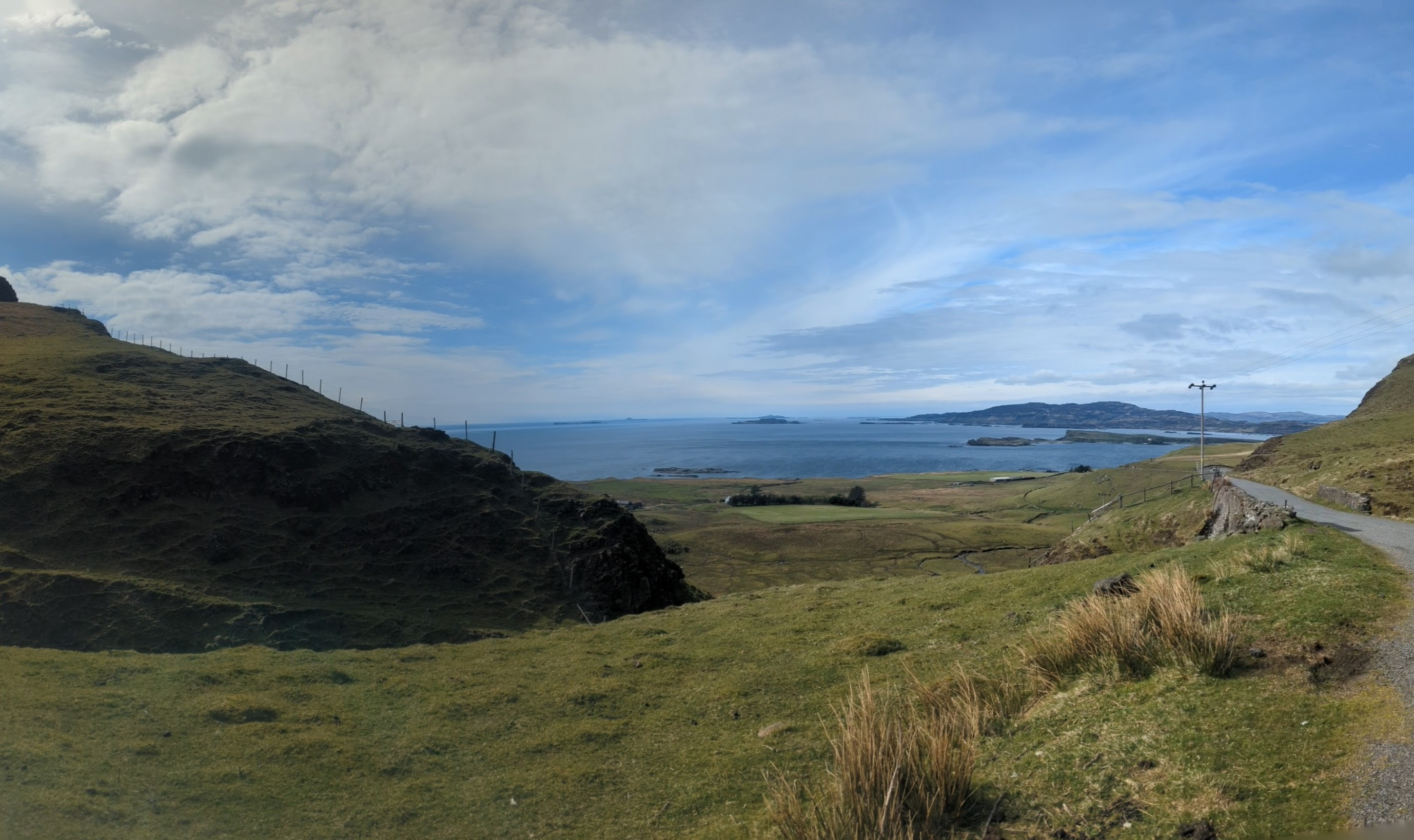
- Looking out towards Inch Kenneth and Ulva

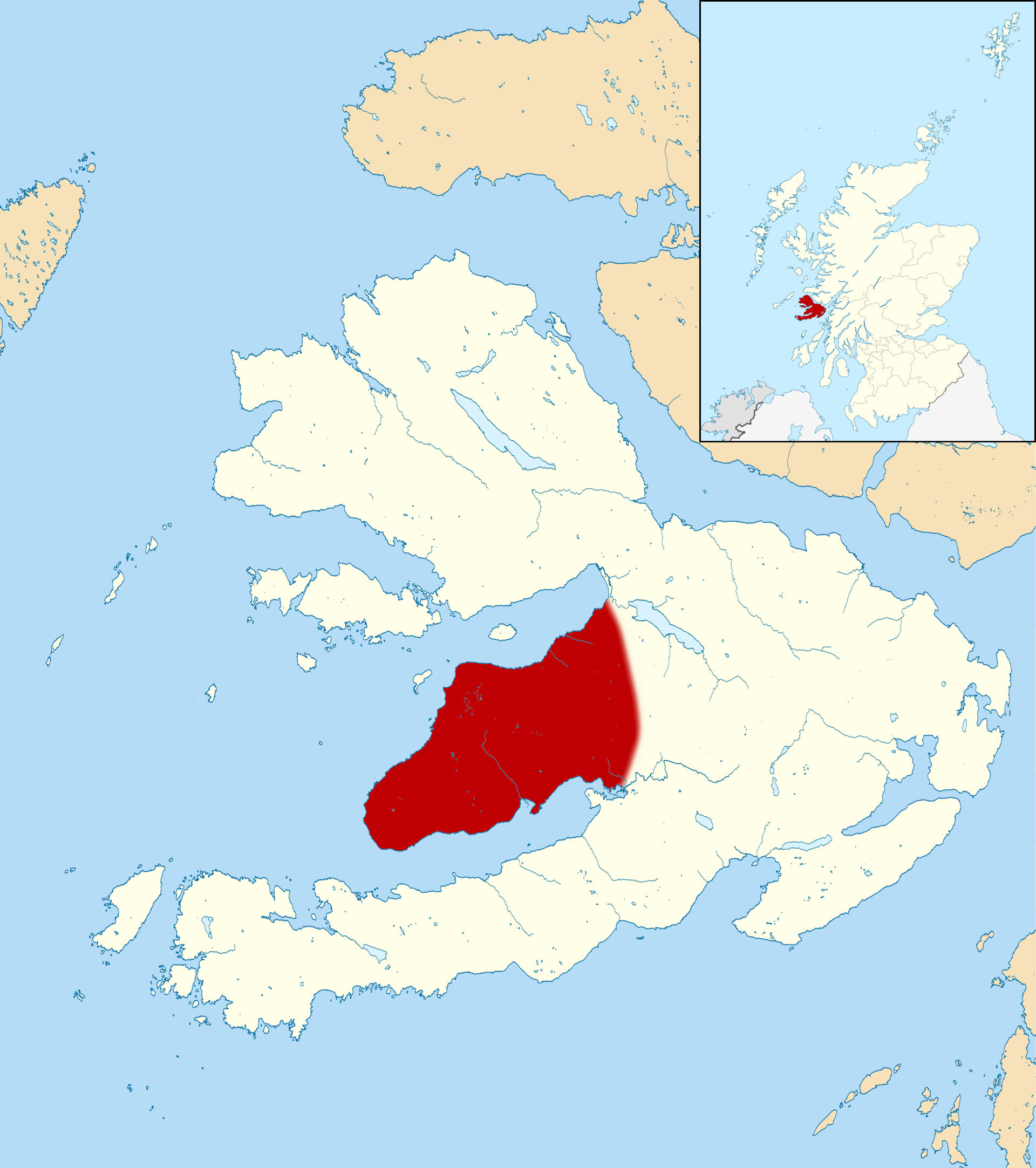

Geography
- Location: Isle of Mull
- Coordinates: 56.39°N 6.12°W

Administration
- Scotland

Ardmeanach (Scottish Gaelic: Ard Meanach) is a peninsula on the Isle of Mull. It is the middle one out of three westward-facing peninsulas on the island, and the name in Gaelic means "Middle Headland" or "Middle Height". It is about 20 km (12 miles) long and 6 km (4 miles) wide, and lies between Loch Scridain and Loch Na Keal.

It is mountainous and includes Ben More, the highest mountain on the island. It is largely uninhabited, with a few isolated settlements along the coast. It is cut in two by a narrow valley (Gleann Seilisdeir) which runs north–south between the two sea lochs and carries the B8035 road. The peninsula (or its western end) is a Special Area of Conservation.
