= St Kenneth's Chapel =

Ruined church in Scotland

Coordinates: 56°26′29″N 6°9′33″W

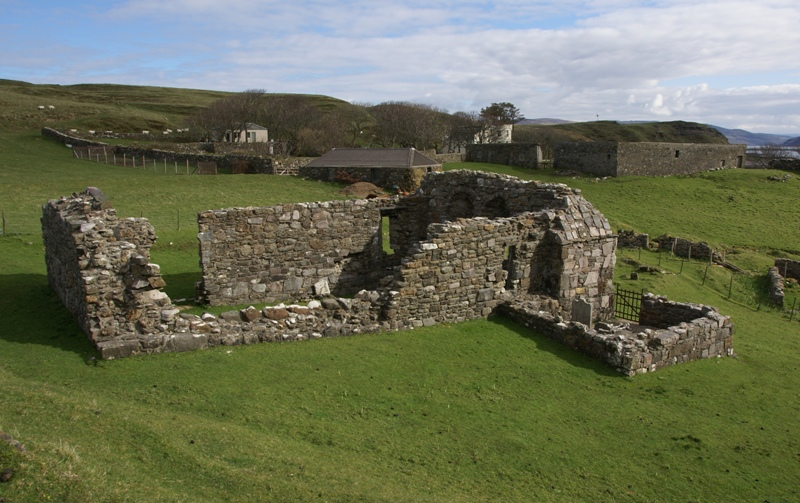
St Kenneth's Chapel

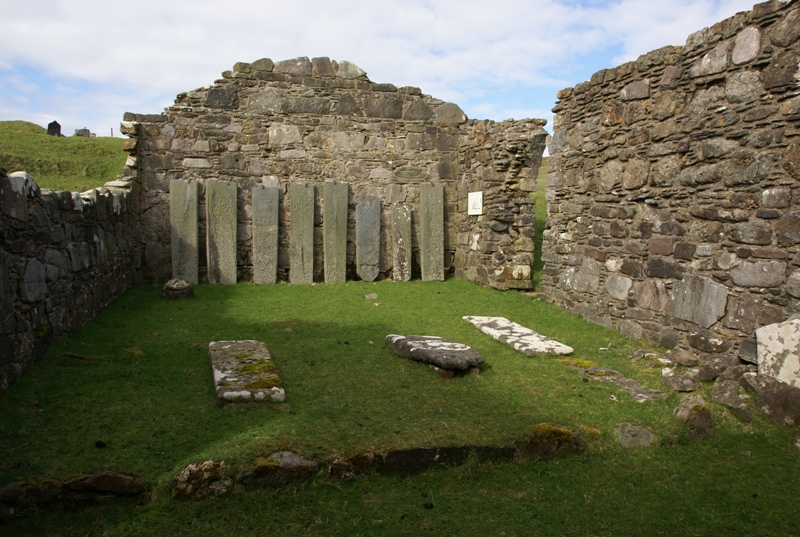
Nave

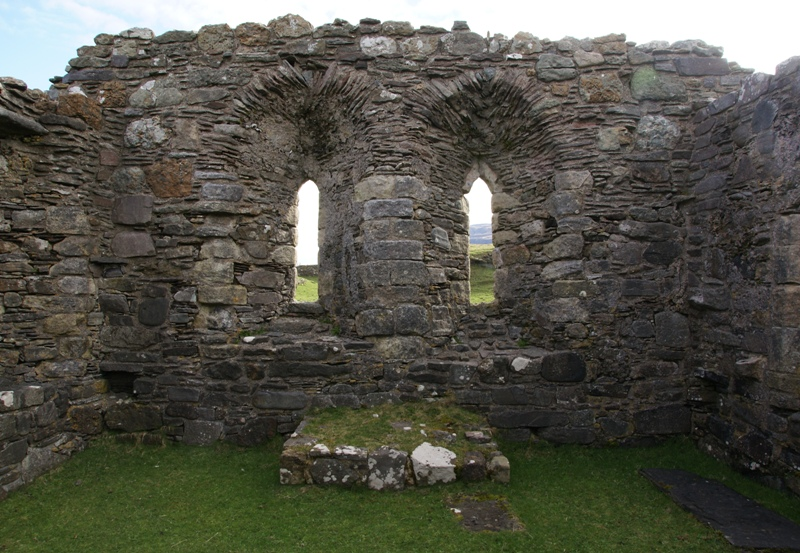
Chancel

St. Kenneth's Chapel is a ruined chapel on Inch Kenneth Island, Parish of Kilfinichen and Kilvickeon, Isle of Mull, Argyll and Bute, Scotland. It dates to the 13th century. It became a Scheduled Monument on 27 March 1928.

== Description ==
The church measures approximately 12 metres (39 ft) by 6 metres (20 ft). It features heavy corner buttresses in front and has four pointed windows; two lancet windows are on the east wall, while there are two smaller windows on the north and south side of the chancel. A step divides the chancel and the nave. The main entrance to the church lies at the west end of the north wall. The church is heavily ruined on the south side in particular. A burial enclosure lies to the south of the chancel.

To the south of the chapel is a cemetery in which there are a large number of graves. Inside the church there are eight cross slabs, which probably date between the 14th and 16th centuries. There are also graves from the 17th and 18th centuries. The cemetery is still occasionally used today. In the southwest corner of the enclosed area, there is a slate high cross. It was placed there in 1926, but was probably made between 1500 and 1560.

== History ==
The exact date of the church's construction is not recorded. On the basis of architectural features, however, it can be dated to the 13th century. The earliest written record of the church to survive is from 1380. From this record and another reference in the year 1549, it is known that it served as the parish church. By the 16th century at the latest, St Kenneth's Chapel came under the control of Iona Nunnery, and Augustinian establishment. Probably as a result of the abolition of the Nunnery in 1547, the chapel ceased to be used and was left to decay. Because of the tilt of the east wall, reinforcements were added in the 16th or 17th century. In 1815 the outer walls were probably still intact, but they have since collapsed.
