= Uisken =

Settlement on the Isle of Mull, Scotland

Coordinates: 56.291°N 6.221°W

Uisken: Scottish Gaelic: Uisgean
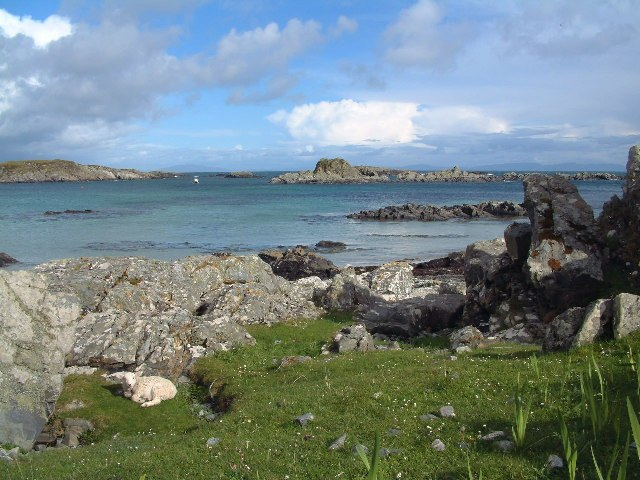
- The coastline at Uisken

- Location within Argyll and Bute
- Population: 6
- OS grid reference: NM388189
- Civil parish: Kilfinichen and Kilvickeon
- Council area: Argyll and Bute
- Lieutenancy area: Argyll and Bute
- Country: Scotland
- Sovereign state: United Kingdom
- Post town: ISLE OF MULL
- Postcode district: PA67
- Dialling code: 01681
- Police: Scotland
- Fire: Scottish
- Ambulance: Scottish
- UK Parliament: Argyll, Bute and South Lochaber
- Scottish Parliament: Argyll and Bute

Uisken (Scottish Gaelic: Uisgean, meaning "water-bay") is a settlement on a sandy bay on the Ross of Mull in the south of the Isle of Mull, on the west coast of Scotland. The settlement is within the parish of Kilfinichen and Kilvickeon.

Originally a series of small settlements before the clearances it was developed as a fishing and crofting settlement with a small quay, known as Port Uisken, and road over to the steamer pier at Bunessan, the development being funded by the Duke of Argyll. The quay soon fell into disrepair but crofting continued with seven crofts being mentioned in the early 1920s and three crofts still being worked today.

A cairn is prominent on the eastern skyline. This is believed to mark the funeral route that coffins used to be carried to the old chapel at Scoor. There is also a large standing stone on the same ridge as the cairn about 500m to the north but this cannot be seen from Uisken.

The population is 6 (2014).
