= Eorsa =

Uninhabited island in the Inner Hebrides of Scotland

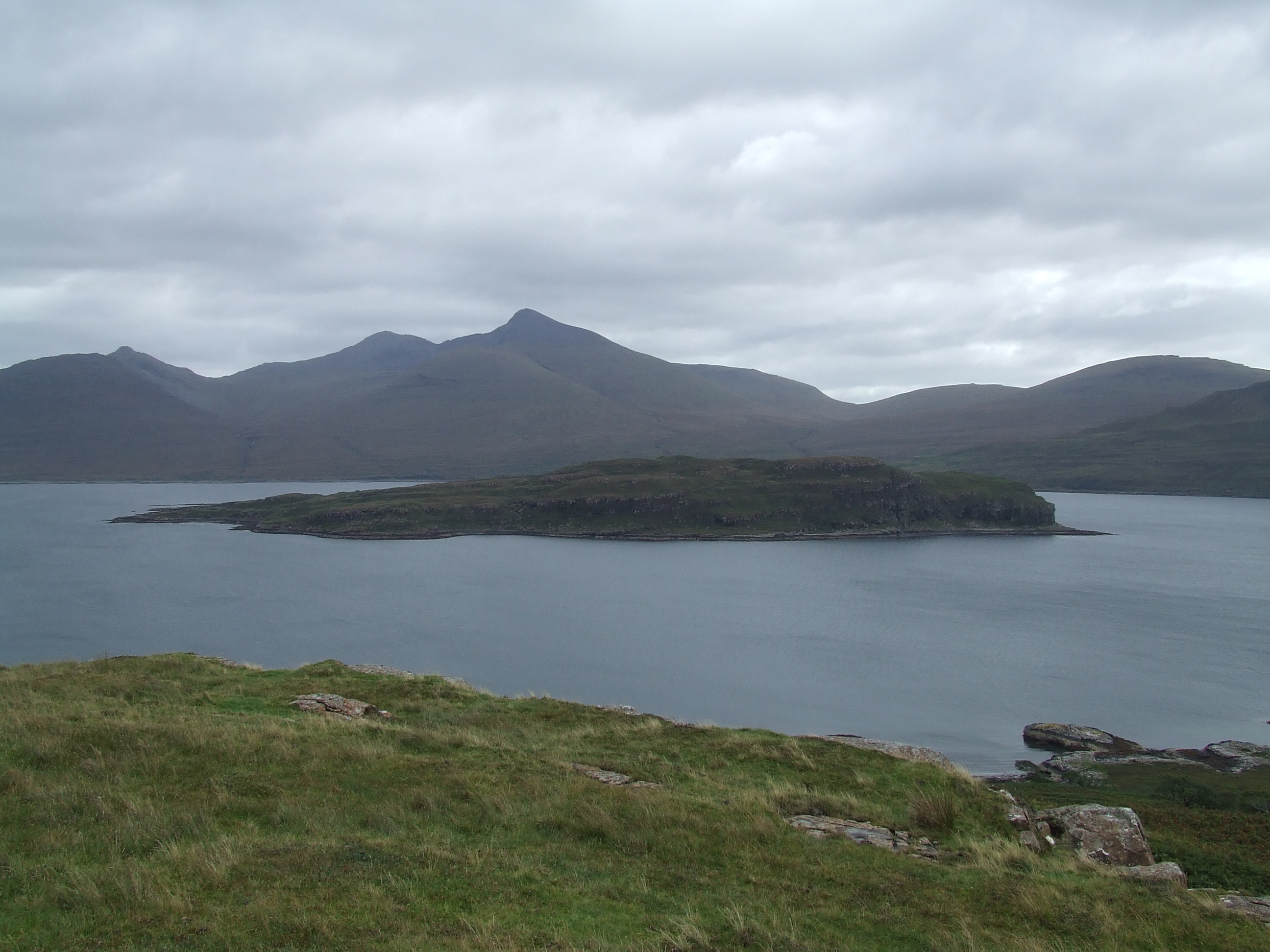
- Eorsa from the north/northwest with Mull in the foreground and background

Location
- Eorsa shown next to Mull
- OS grid reference: NM481378
- Coordinates: 56.47°N 6.08°W

Name
- Name meaning: uncertain Jorulof-øy - Jorulf's island or from àrsaidh - ancient

Physical geography
- Island group: Mull
- Area: 122 ha (1/2 sq mi)
- Area rank: 136=
- Highest elevation: 98 m (322 ft)

Administration
- Council area: Argyll and Bute
- Country: Scotland
- Sovereign state: United Kingdom

Demographics
- Population: 0

Eorsa is an uninhabited island in the Inner Hebrides of Scotland.

== Geography ==
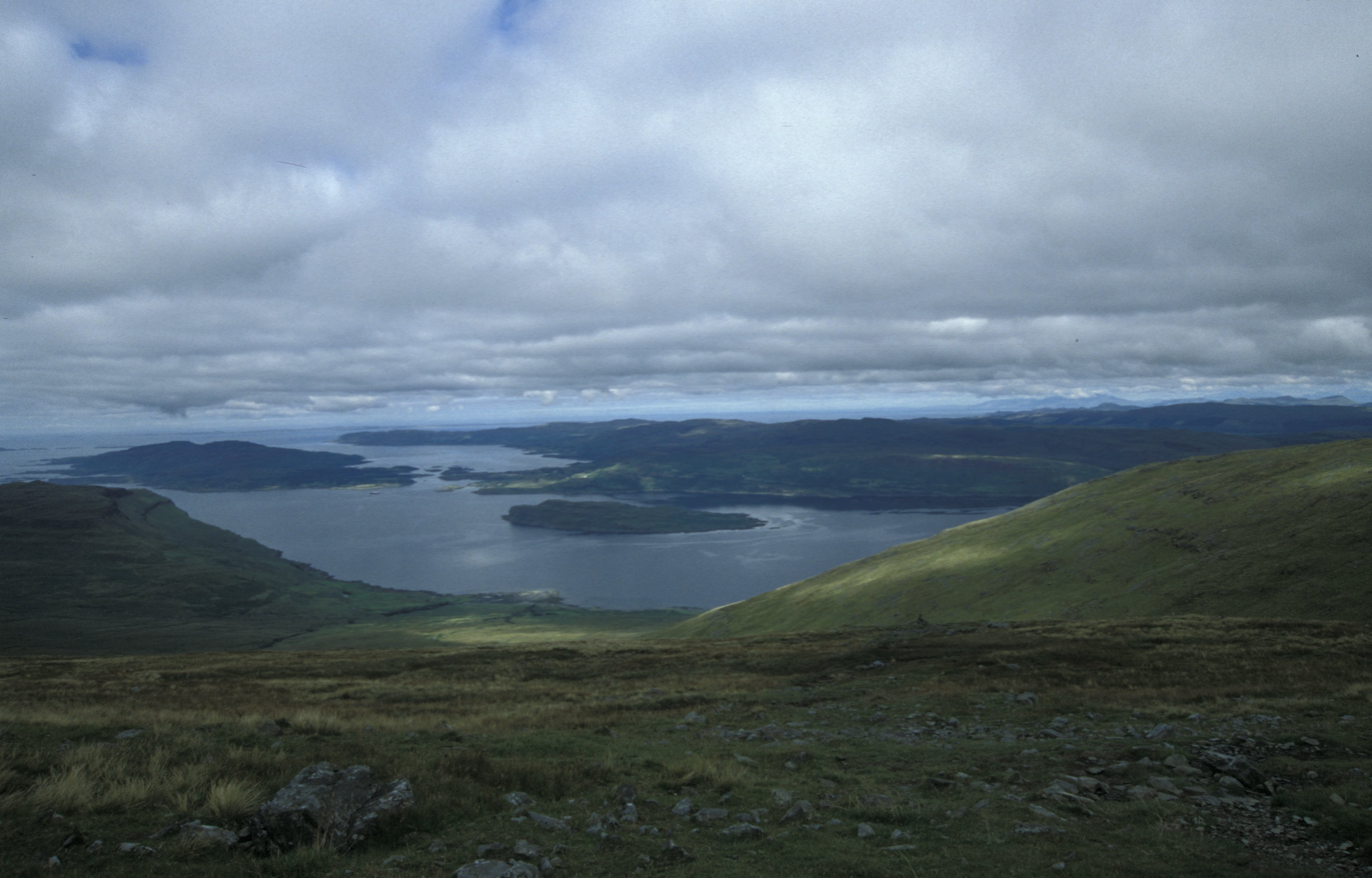
Loch na Keal – Eorsa can be seen in the middle of the loch, and Ulva in the background

Eorsa lies in Loch na Keal on the west coast of the Isle of Mull, to the east of Ulva. It is part of the Loch Na Keal National Scenic Area, one of 40 in Scotland.

== History ==
Many of the nearby islands, including Inch Kenneth, have early ecclesiastical connections. Eorsa may have done too. It once belonged to the Abbey of Iona, and became the property of the Duke of Argyll.

During World War I, the island was used as a British naval anchorage.

== Cultural references ==
The island is the setting of Nigel Tranter's 1952 novel Bridal Path, which was made into the film of the same name in 1959. As the comic novel takes the perils of island inbreeding as its theme, Tranter may have chosen an unpopulated island to avoid giving offence.

== Wildlife ==
Eorsa is separated from Mull by nearly a mile of water at the closest point so there are very few land animals.

== See also ==
- List of islands of Scotland
