= Loch na Keal =

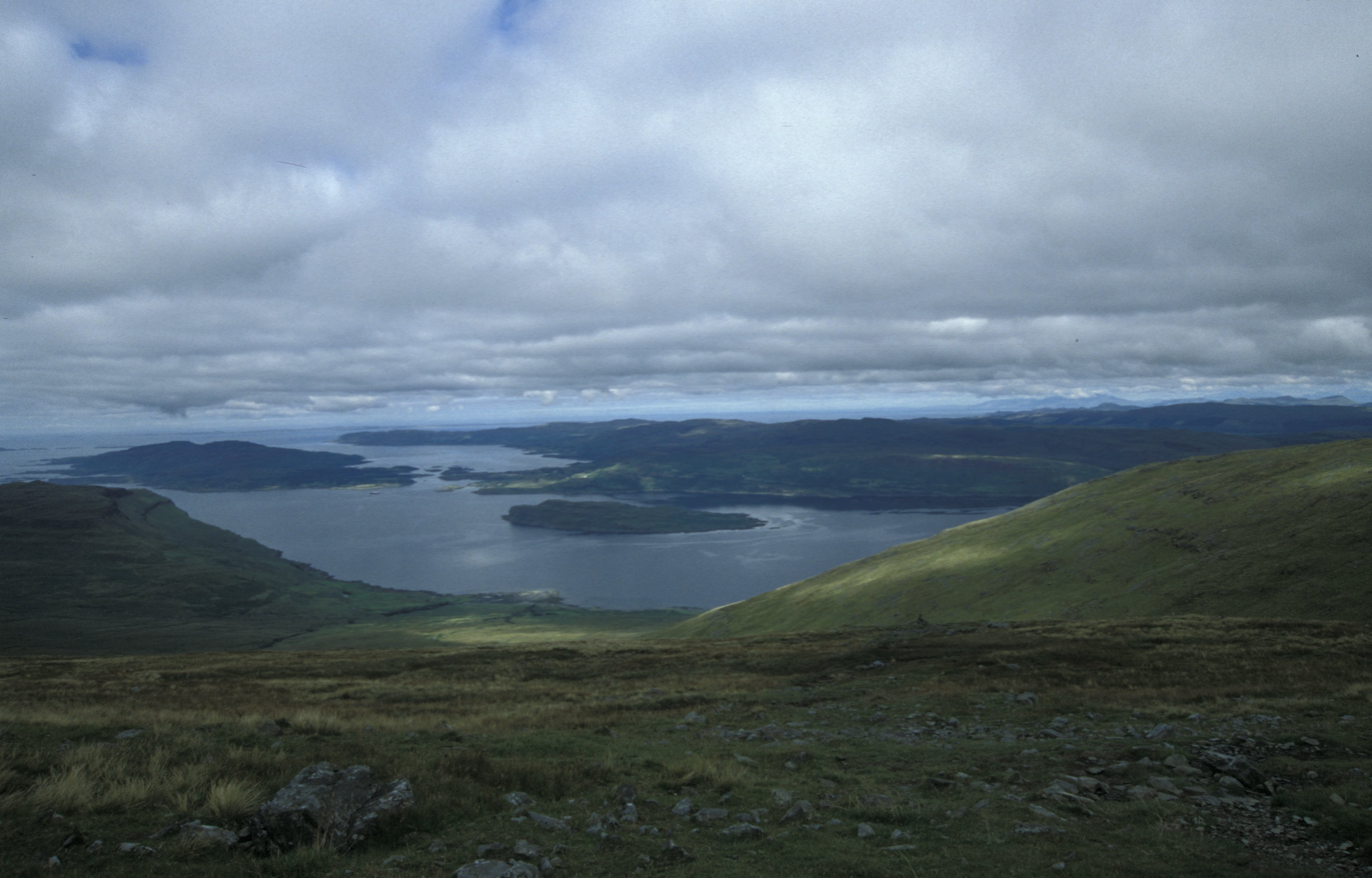
- View of the loch from Ben More
- Interactive map of Loch na Keal
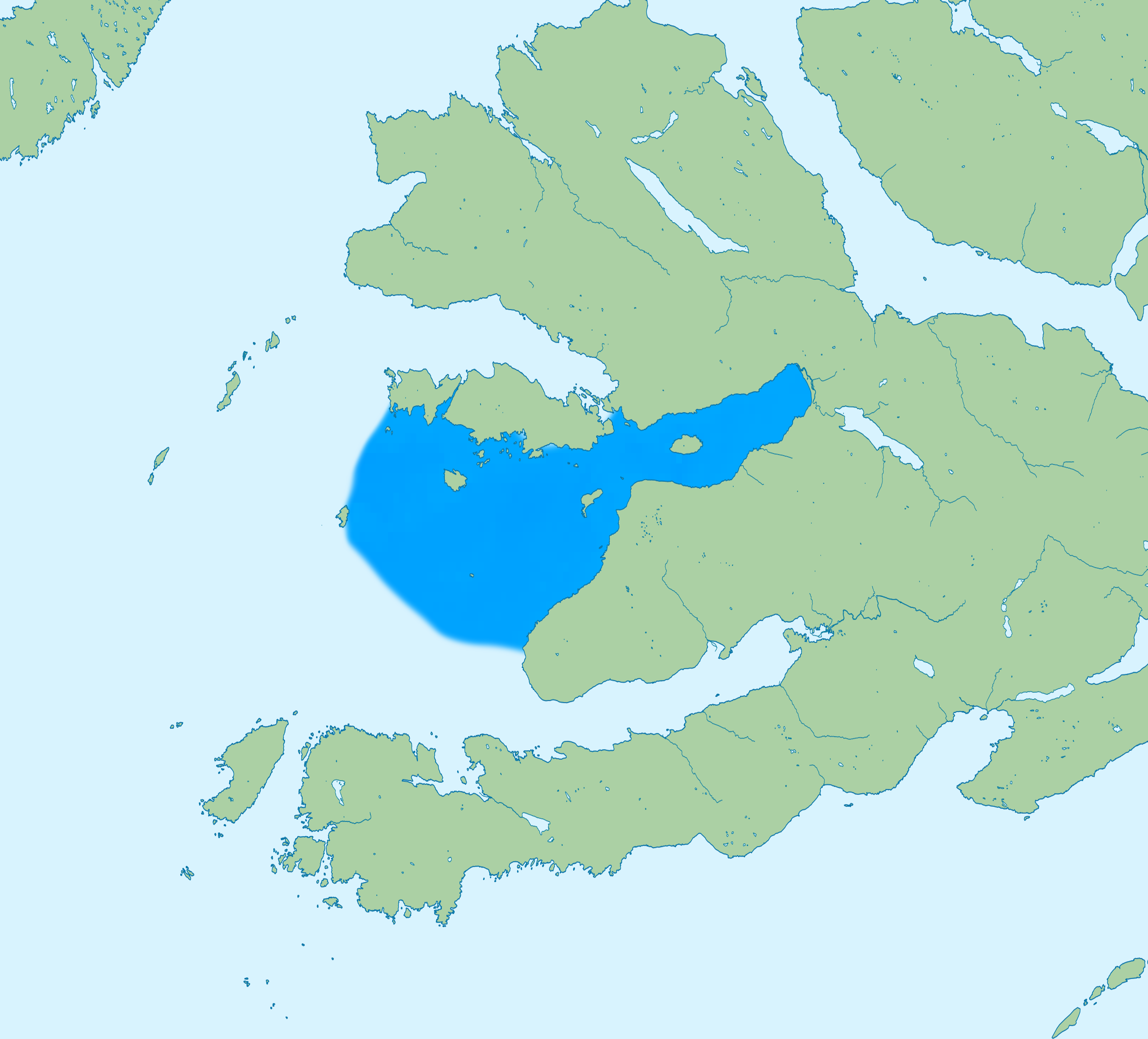
- Map of Loch na Keal
- Location: Isle of Mull, Argyll and Bute, Scotland
- Coordinates: 56°28′N 6°05′W
- Type: Sea loch
- Basin countries: Scotland, United Kingdom
- Max. length: 23 km (14 mi)
- Max. width: 20 km (12 mi)
- Surface area: 442 km^{2} (171 sq mi)
- Average depth: 38 m (124 ft)
- Max. depth: 112 m (366 ft)
- Islands: Many: Ulva is the largest

Loch na Keal (Note: Scottish Gaelic: Loch na Caol, meaning Loch of the Kyle, or Narrows, also Loch of the Cliffs) is the principal sea loch on the western, or Atlantic coastline of the island of Mull, in the Inner Hebrides, Argyll and Bute, Scotland. Loch na Keal extends over 20 kilometres (12 mi) inland, almost bisecting Mull, and extending to within 5 km (3 mi) of the eastern shore. The loch gives its name to the Loch na Keal National Scenic Area, one of forty national scenic areas in Scotland.

== Geography ==
Loch na Keal consists of a wide triangular shaped outer loch, separated from Loch Tuath to the north by the islands of Gometra and Ulva, leading into a narrow inner loch. The island of Staffa is at the mouth of the outer loch, Inch Kenneth is in the outer loch, and Eorsa is in the inner loch.

The outer loch's northern coastline on Ulva is made of basaltic ridges and many rocks and islets, with many different types of vegetation. The southern coastline, bounded by the Ardmeanach peninsula, has cliffs, land slips and substantial slopes that are covered in scree. The inner loch coastline is bounded on both sides by Mull. The north shore, steeply sloped, has some moderate hills, with Killiechronan Wood to the east. The southern shore consists of cliffs and slopes leading to the Munro and extinct volcano of Ben More and Scarisdale Wood to the south east.

Loch na Keal has no significant villages. Most of the small settlements are at the head (east end) of the loch where there is a small area of flat land (where the River Bà flows into the loch from Loch Bà). These include Gruline, a small scattered township, primarily consisting of crofting and tourist homes. The closest larger village is Salen, located 4 km (2 1/2 mi) northeast across the isthmus from the head of the loch.

The B8073 road runs along the northern shore of Loch na Keal, heading west from Gruline, before looping back to head to Tobermory via the north shore of Mull. The B8035 road runs along Loch na Keal's southern shore, before turning inland to pass over the Ardmeanach peninsula to the west of Ben More.

== Islands ==
There are many islands within the loch, ranging in size from Ulva at 19 km^{2} (7 sq mi) to various small rocks and skerries.

=== Ulva ===
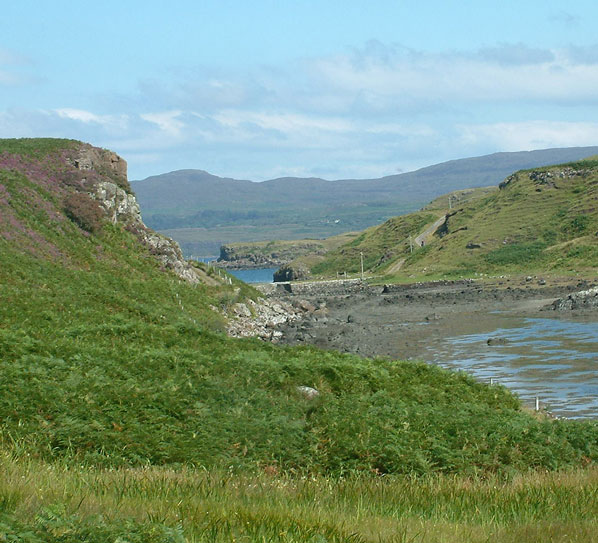
Bridge connecting Gometra on left to Ulva on right

Ulva (Scottish Gaelic: Ulbha, pronounced [ˈulˠ̪u.ə]), the largest island of the west coast of Mull, is connected to the neighbouring island of Gometra by a bridge. Much of the island is formed from Cenozoic basalt rocks, which is formed into columns in places. Ulva has been populated since the Mesolithic and there are various Neolithic remains on the island. The Norse occupation of the island in the Early Historic Period has left few tangible artefacts but did bequeath the island its name, which is probably from Ulvoy, meaning "wolf island". Celtic culture was a major influence during both Pictish and Dalriadan times as well as the post-Norse period when the islands became part of modern Scotland. This long period, when Gaelic became the dominant language, was ended by the 19th-century Clearances. At its height Ulva had a population of over 800, but today this has declined to fewer than 10. Wildlife is abundant: cetaceans are regularly seen in the surrounding waters and over 500 species of plant have been recorded. Today there is a regular ferry service and tourism is the mainstay of the economy. In March 2018 the Scottish Land Fund pledged £4.4 million towards a community buyout of the island.

=== Gometra ===
Gometra (Scottish Gaelic: Gòmastra [ˈkoːməs̪t̪ɾə]) lies immediately west of Ulva, to which it is linked by a bridge, and at low tide also by a beach. It is about 425 hectares (1 5/8 sq mi) in size. The name is also applied to the island summit, which is a Marilyn (a hill or mountain with a prominence of 150 metres or more). The island is agricultural, formerly growing grain for the monastery on Iona. Once home to a population of over a hundred, it is now down to a tight-knit community of a handful of people, up to a thousand black face sheep, highland cattle, pigs, horses, a flock of feral goats, and red deer. Historical sites on the island include an old burial ground, the remains of two duns and old settlements. It has no school, doctor, or ferry. It has a weekly postal service and issues its own local carriage stamps.

=== Little Colonsay ===
Little Colonsay (Scottish Gaelic: Colbhasa Beag) is uninhabited, and lies to the south of Ulva and Gometra. The geology of the island is columnar basalt, similar to that of neighbouring Staffa. In 1841 the population was 16 individuals in two households, but by 1881 no population was recorded, the island having been cleared in 1846 by F.W. Clark, the notorious owner of Gometra and Ulva. The censuses of 1891 and 1931 recorded two inhabitants. In the early 20th century the island was farmed by John MacColum, known as "Johnny Colonsay", but he and his family were forced out by a plague of rats.

=== Staffa ===
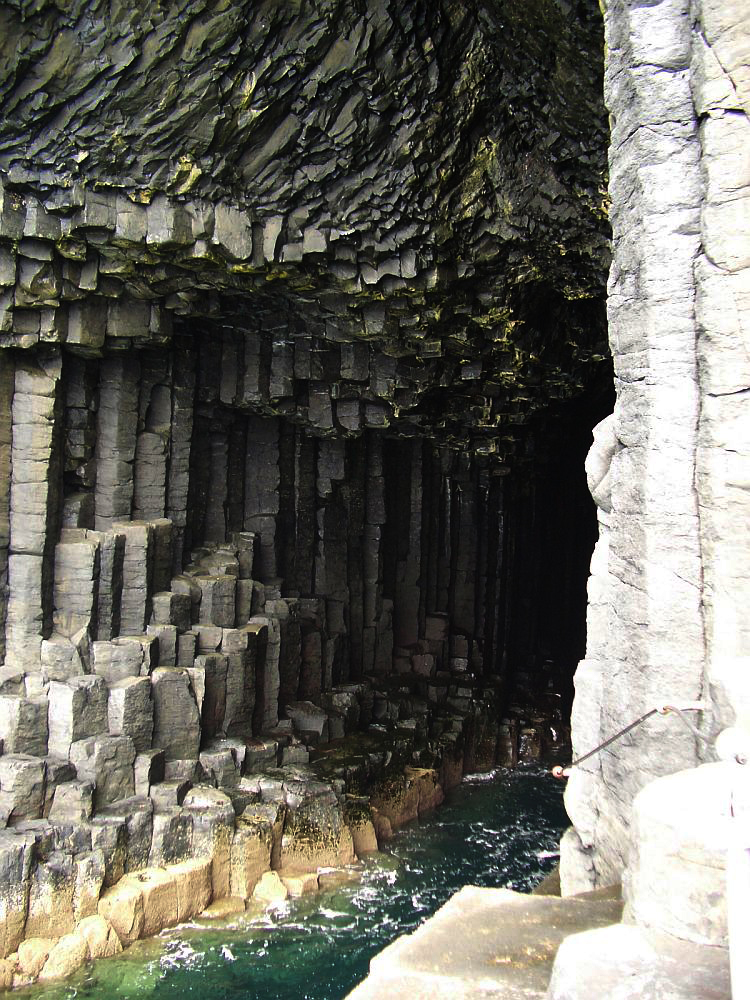
Basalt columns inside Fingal's Cave on Staffa.

Staffa (Scottish Gaelic: Stafa, pronounced [s̪t̪afa]) lies about 10 kilometres (6 mi) west of Mull. Its name was derived from the Old Norse for stave or pillar island, given by the Vikings as its columnar basalt reminded them of their houses, which were built from vertically placed tree-logs. The island came to prominence in the late 18th century after a visit by Sir Joseph Banks. He and his fellow-travellers extolled the natural beauty of the basalt columns in general and of the island's main sea cavern, which Banks renamed 'Fingal's Cave'. Their visit was followed by those of many other prominent personalities throughout the next two centuries, including Queen Victoria and Felix Mendelssohn. The latter's Hebrides Overture brought further fame to the island, which was by then uninhabited. It has been in the care of the National Trust for Scotland since 1986.

=== Inchkenneth ===
Inch Kenneth (Scottish Gaelic: Innis Choinnich) is a small grassy island at the entrance of Loch na Keal, to the south of Ulva. The island is named after St Kenneth, a follower of Saint Columba, who is said to have founded a monastery on the island. Inchkenneth was visited in 1773 by Samuel Johnson and James Boswell during their tour of the Hebrides; they were entertained there by Sir Allan MacLean, head of the Maclean clan. Both Johnson and Boswell published accounts of their visit. Its most famous owners were the eccentric Mitford family. Nazi sympathiser Unity Mitford spent her final years on the island. Following the death of their father Lord Redesdale, the island was inherited under Scots Law by the surviving Mitford sisters and not his wife, as Lord Redesdale had willed it to his deceased son Tom. When their mother died in 1963, Nancy gave her share to Jessica, who bought the shares of Diana, Deborah and Pamela. Jessica, a former communist, teasingly suggested that it might become a Soviet submarine base.

=== Eorsa ===
Eorsa is an uninhabited island in to the east of Ulva. The island once belonged to the Abbey of Iona and later became the property of the Duke of Argyll. The island is the fictional setting of Nigel Tranter's 1952 novel Bridal Path, which was made into film of the same name in 1959. As the comic novel takes the perils of island inbreeding as its theme, it is assumed that Tranter deliberately chose an unpopulated island to avoid giving offence.

=== Treshnish Islands ===
The Treshnish Isles form an archipelago of small islands and skerries, lying beyond the mouth of Loch na Keal but within the designated area of the national scenic area. The archipelago stretches for roughly 7 kilometres (4 mi) from the island of Bac Beag in the south towards Cairn na Burgh Beag to the north east. The largest island in the group is Lunga, which is 7 kilometres (4 mi) west of Gometra, 6 kilometres (4 mi) southwest of Rubha' a' Chaoil on Mull, 12 kilometres (7 mi) south east of Coll, and 5 kilometres (3 mi) north west of Staffa. Other larger islands in the group are Cairn na Burgh Mòr, Fladda and Bac Mòr. There are numerous smaller skerries, particularly north of Lunga. All the islands are of volcanic origin.

== Nature and conservation ==
Loch na Keal National Scenic Area
- IUCN category V (protected landscape/seascape)
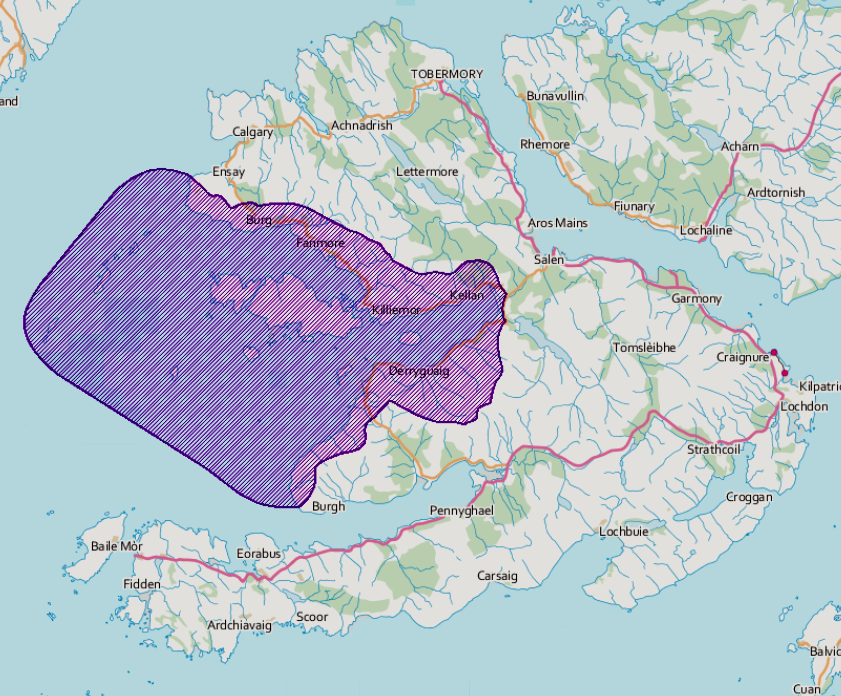
- The extent of the Loch na Keal National Scenic Area
- Location: Isle of Mull, Argyll and Bute, Scotland
- Coordinates: 56°28′N 6°05′W
- Area: 443 km^{2} (171 sq mi)
- Established: 1981
- Governing body: NatureScot

Loch na Keal gives its name to the Loch na Keal National Scenic Area, one of the forty national scenic areas in Scotland, which are defined so as to identify areas of exceptional scenery and to ensure its protection from inappropriate development. The designated area covers 44,250 ha in total, of which 13,507 ha is on land, with a further 30,742 ha being marine (i.e. below low tide level). The designated area covers the shoreline of the loch from Treshnish Point in the northwest to Rhubha na h-Uamha in the south, as well as the islands of Staffa, Ulva, Gometra and the Treshnish Isles.

The land on the southern side of the loch is designated as a Special Protection Area under the Natura 2000 programme due particularly for its importance to golden eagles, which have a long history of breeding in the area, having been monitored since the early eighties. Golden eagles within the SPA have an unusually high breeding productivity compared to other populations on the west coast of Scotland, leading to one of the highest density populations of these birds in the UK. The outer waters of the loch are also protected under Natura 2000 as a Special Area of Conservation, due to the presence of harbour porpoises.

The Burg estate, covering 617 ha of land at the tip of the Ardmeanach peninsula on the southern side of the loch, has been owned by the National Trust for Scotland since 1932. The imprint of a 50 million year-old tree, known as MacCulloch’s Fossil Tree, can be seen in the rocks at Burg. The area also contains Bronze Age burial cairns, the remains of an Iron Age settlement, and the ruins of later crofting townships.
