= Mary MacDonald (poet) =

Gaelic poet and hymn writer

- Born: Mary MacDougall; 1789; Ardtun, Scotland
- Died: 27 May 1872 (aged 83); Ardtun, Scotland
- Known for: Gaelic poet and hymn writer

Mary MacDonald (née MacDougall; Scottish Gaelic; Màiri MacDhùghaill; 1789– 21 May 1872) was a Scottish Gaelic poet and hymn writer who lived on the island of Mull, Scotland. Her best known poem is "Leanabh an Àigh", translated as "Child in Manger"; it was set to a traditional Scottish tune, "Bunessan", named after her home village, where there is a memorial for her.

== Biography ==
MacDonald was born in the tiny crofting settlement of Ardtun, north-east of Bunessan on the Ross of Mull in 1789. Her mother was Anne Morrison and her father was Mr. MacDougall, a farmer. Before she married crofter Neil MacDonald, her maiden name was MacDougall, known as MacLucas in some places.

She was a devout Baptist and never spoke English. She spent most of time on her spinning wheel by singing hymns and poems. Only some of her poems reached beyond locality. Her most well-known hymn is "Leanabh an Àigh", translated as "Child in Manger"; she also wrote a satirical poem about tobacco in response to her husband's smoking.

She died in Ardtun on 21 May 1872.

== Poetry ==
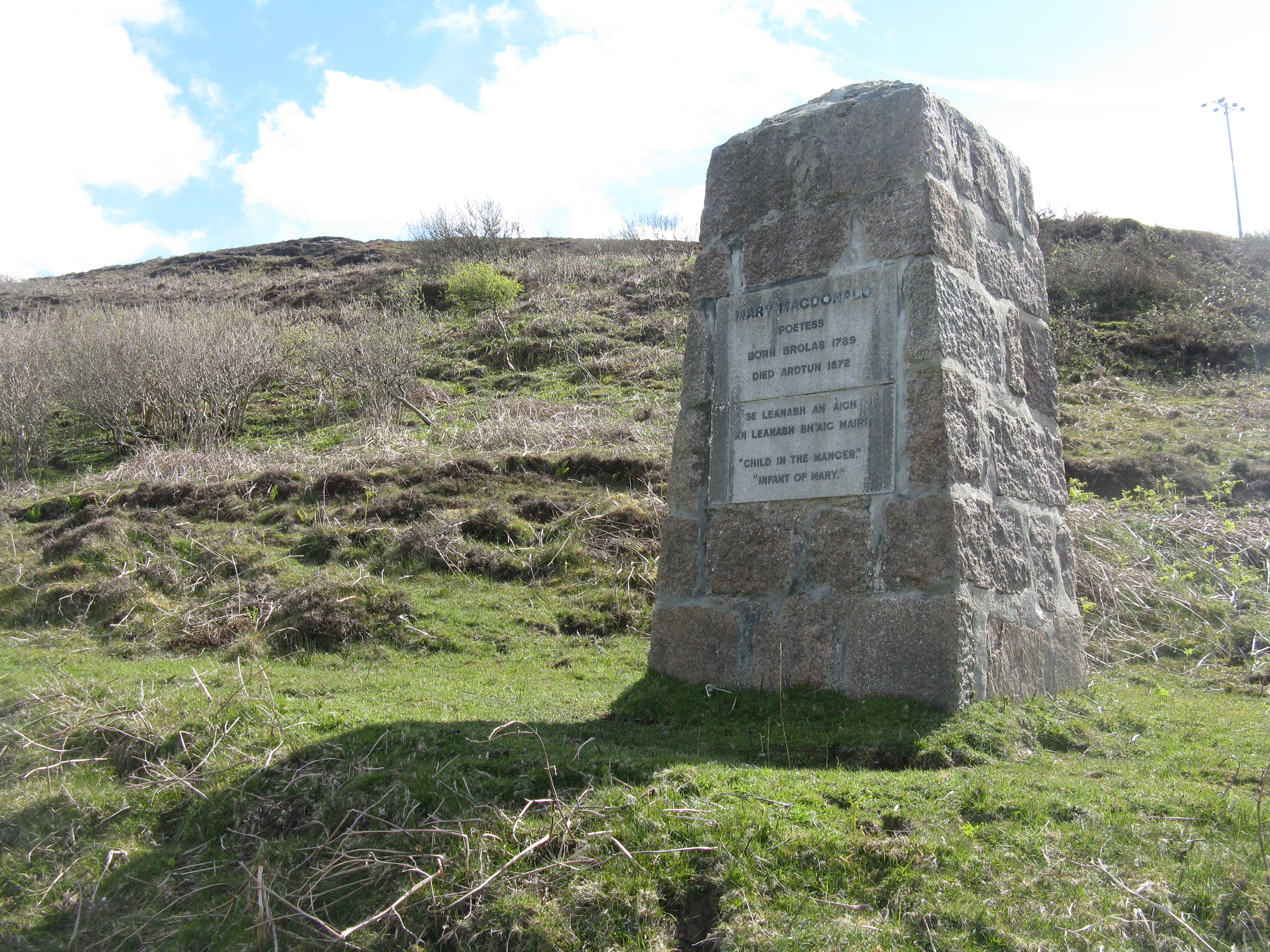
Mary MacDonald's monument, located beside the main road at Knockan near Ardtun

Child in the manger, infant of Mary;

Outcast and stranger, Lord of all; Child who inherits all our transgressions, All our demerits on Him fall.

Once the most holy Child of salvation Gently and lowly lived below; Now, as our glorious, mighty Redeemer, See Him victorious o’er each foe.

Prophets foretold Him, infant of wonder; Angels behold Him on His throne; Worthy our Savior of all our praises; Happy forever are His own.

— Written by Mary MacDonald, translated by Lachlan Macbean, "Child in Manger"

The hymn was written in Gaelic and is still in use. Lachlan Macbean's translation of Mary's hymn was included in the 1927 Revised Church Hymnary. Macbean firstly read the hymn for his Songs and Hymns of the Scottish Highlands, published in 1888. Macbean then translated the title of Mary's hymn into English as "Child in the manger" and named the tune "Bunessan". The tune ''Bunessan'' would later be used by Eleanor Farjeon to accompany her hymn "Morning Has Broken," and eventually become world famous when in 1971 Cat Stevens released his version of the hymn.
