= Loch Scridain =

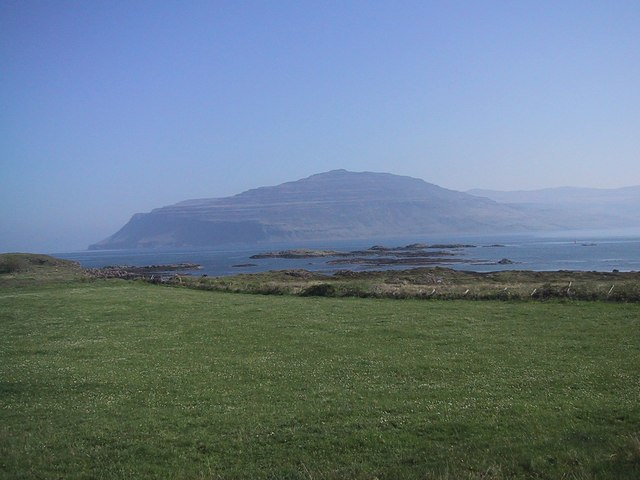
- View from Knockan
- Interactive map of Loch Scridain
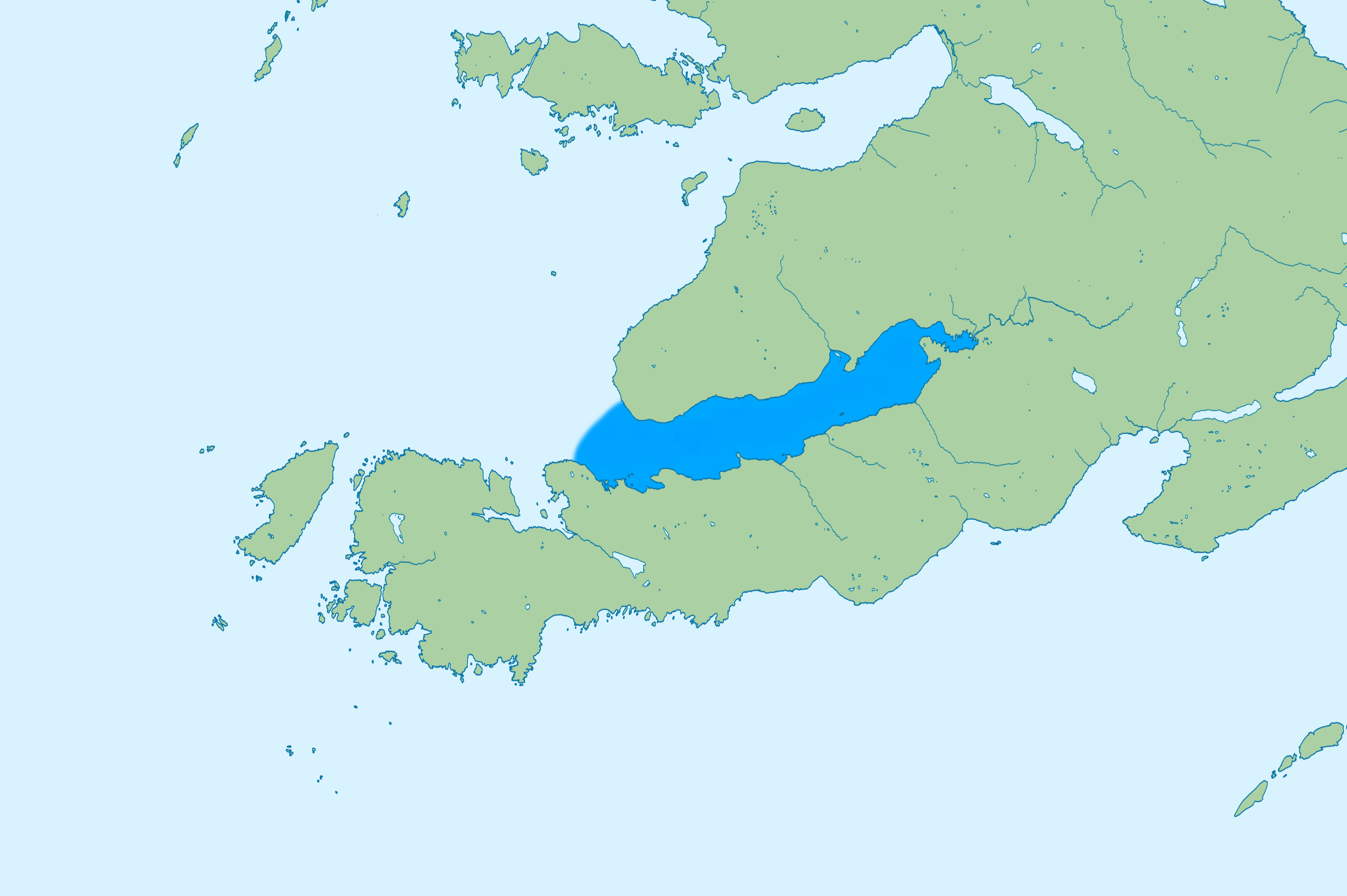
- Map of Loch Scridain
- Location: Isle of Mull, Scotland
- Coordinates: 56.366°N 6.084°W
- Basin countries: United Kingdom
- Max. length: 12 km (7.5 mi)
- Max. width: 1.88 km (1.17 mi)
- Surface area: 30.58 km^{2} (11.81 sq mi)
- Max. depth: 121 m (396 ft)

Loch Scridain is a 12-kilometre-long (7-mile) sea loch, with a west-south west aspect, on the western, or Atlantic coastline of the Isle of Mull, in the Inner Hebrides, Argyll and Bute, Scotland.

== Geography ==
Loch Scridain extends inland as far as the island's only Munro and extinct volcano, Ben More, a large massif on the Ardmeanach peninsula to the north; the imposing Bearraich hill overlooks the mouth of the loch. To the south is the Ross of Mull, the longest peninsula on Mull, that reaches past the sea loch boundary into the Atlantic. Near the head of Loch Scridain is the Aird of Kinloch, a small peninsula that almost separates the main loch from the small inner sea loch, Loch Beg. Loch Beg is fed by the River Coladoir.

Seabank Villa on the lochside at Kilfinichen Bay is the type locality for the mineral mullite.

== Settlements ==
Loch Scridain has three settlements, Tiroran, Kilfinichen, and Pennyghael, with a total population of about 60. The A849 to Bunessan and Fionnphort runs along the southern shore of the loch and there is a turn off in Pennyghael to Carsaig Bay.

== Geology ==
Loch Scridain to the Ardmeanach peninsula is a lava landscape in which the lava flows have created a layered effect. Basalt lava is rich in minerals and the land between the crags is green and fertile. There is black basalt, stained orange in places. The orange colour represents the top surfaces of the flow, weathered by the tropical climate of 60 million years ago. There is a fossil tree, with a cave to its right, a large boulder on the shore just below, and a small area of columnar basalt on its left. The cast of the tree is a hollow half-cylinder about 1.2 m (4 ft) wide, starting just above ground level. Just beyond the tree, there is a black sand beach, and there are in the basalt shoreline slab some older boulders overwhelmed by the lava flow of 60 million years ago.
