= Carsaig Arches =

Natural arch on the Isle of Mull

Coordinates: 56.293108°N 6.052436°W

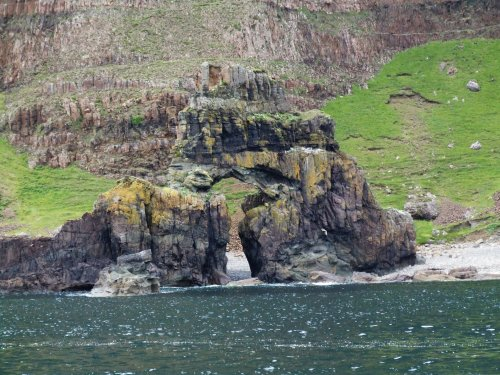
Carsaig Arches

Carsaig Arches are natural arch cliff formations on the Ross of Mull in the south of the Isle of Mull, on the west coast of Scotland. They are situated below Malcolm's Point, at the base of the Rudha Fhaoilean cliffs. To the east are Carsaig Bay, and Eas na Dabhaich.

The coastal cliff formations are the result of the erosion of oolitic rock beds located to the west of the entrance to Loch Bay. Reached via a road from the Carsaig Pier, the track is strewn with volcanic rocks and boulders and involves about 4 miles of walking to reach it.

The first arch is visible at the end of the trek while descending from the ridge and looks as if it is opening into the sea and the second one is hidden. The openings created by wave action have been likened to cave entrances that "lead to another planet." They are most easily approached during low tides. Of the two arches seen below the cliff, one has been described as being like a railway tunnel "deep and dark" and the other rises high and overlain by debris which is conjectured as being of an earlier collapsed arch. One of the formations is a pyramidal mass of rock, perforated through the middle by an unusually shaped arch (called the "keyhole"), and surmounted by the solitary shaft of a basaltic pillar. Another arch ("tunnel") is massive, with columnar basalts appearing to hang from the top.) It is 20 metres (66 ft) in height over a length of 43 metres (141 ft) with a width of 20 metres (66 ft). Wild goats, golden eagles, breeding fulmars, and kittiwakes frequent the area.

== Gallery ==
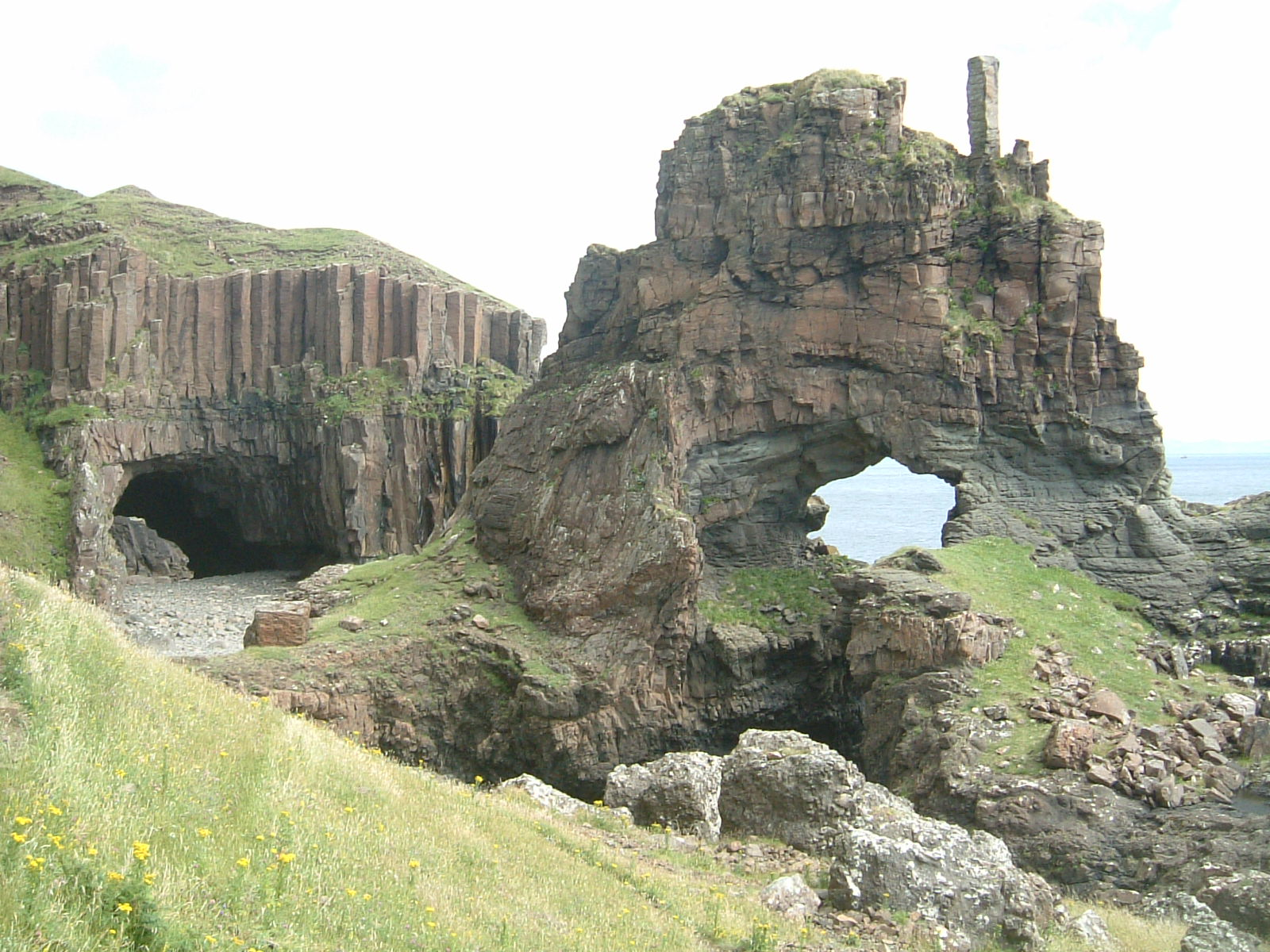

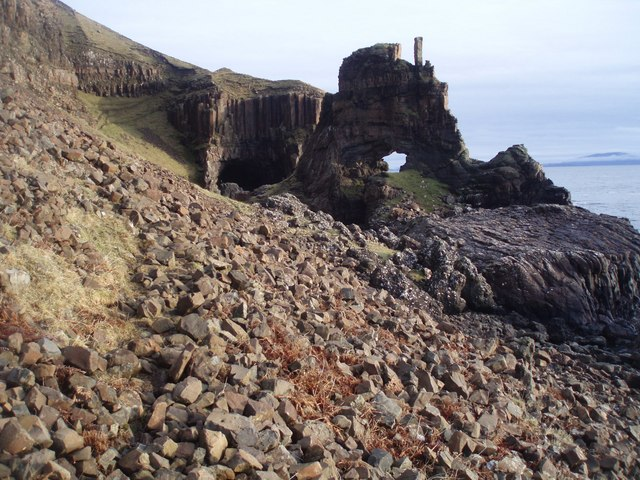

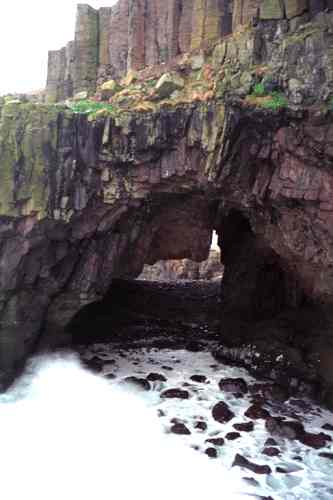
