= Carsaig Bay =

Cove on the coast of Scotland

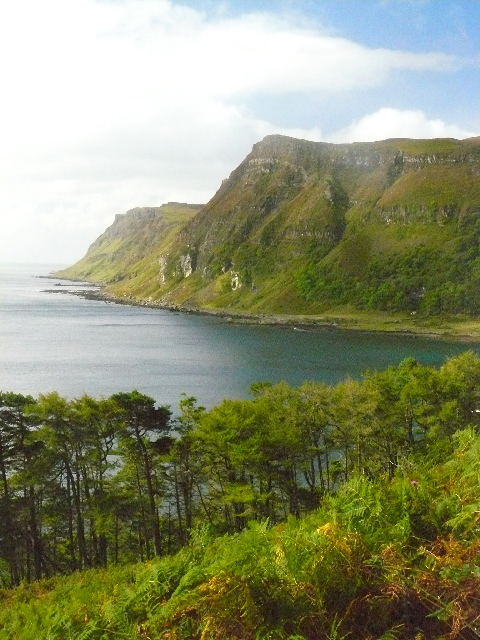

- Location within Mull
- Location: Isle of Mull
- Coordinates: 56°19′13″N 5°58′43″W
- Basin countries: Scotland

Carsaig Bay is a cove on the Ross of Mull in the south of the Isle of Mull, off the west coast of Scotland. It is situated 5 kilometres (3 miles) eastward of Rudha Fhaoilean, and 7 km (4 1/2 mi) south of Pennyghael. The bay is small and is surrounded by high, precipitous hills. It is unsafe for water craft, except in the part sheltered by the island of Gamhnach Mhòr, where small vessels can obtain anchorage. The northeastern part of Carsaig Bay is rocky and foul from 180–370 metres (600–1,200 feet) offshore from the eastern end of Gamhnach Mhòr to the head of the bay. Three of the rocks are marked by perches to facilitate the approach to Carsaig Quay. The tidal streams along the south coast of Mull are weak westward of Carsaig Bay.

== Geography and geology ==
The bay is on the south coast of the Ross of Mull and extends from Rubh' a' Chromain in the west to Carraig Mhòr in the east. It is accessible from the A849 from Craignure, which leads to an unclassified road 15 km (9 mi) east of Bunessan, the last stretch of which is steep and very narrow.

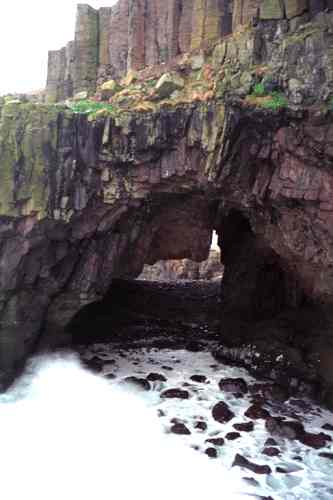
Carsaig Arches

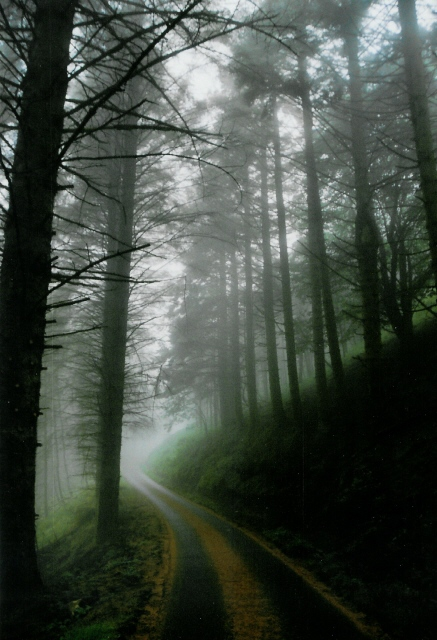
Woodland above Carsaig

The precipitous cliffs on this coast are tallest at Rudha Fhaoilean. where they are 290 m (950 ft) high at about 365 m (1,198 ft) inland. The coast from Rudha Fhaoilean to Rudha Dubh, the western point of the entrance to Loch Buie, a distance of 66 km (41 mi) to the east, is steep except where the bay is formed. This area affords some shelter by Gamhnach Mhòr. The cliffs are lined with basaltic columns, some of them attaining a diameter of 2.1 m (6 ft 11 in). The Carsaig Arches, a natural formation situated at Malcolm's Point, are located west of the bay.

A well known cave here is the Nun's Cave, where nuns from the Iona Nunnery sought refuge during the Scottish Reformation. The use of some of these caves reportedly dates back to the 6th century. It is also recorded that during the 15th century, the monks (1500 of them) of the Iona Abbey used to visit the shores and caves here to collect sea washed stones and carve them into artifacts and grave stones. Erosive action of the hills has created an amphitheater in basaltic formations rising to a height of 215 m (705 ft) (240 m or 790 ft is also mentioned). At the termination of the track the huge columnar basalts rise to a height of 240 m (790 ft). Other formations seen are weathered sills and dykes. Fossils are a frequent find here. The site has sedimentary rocks of Palaeocene age. Cretaceous strata recorded here has geological formations of sandstones and mudstones with several chalk clasts. The sill formation noted here is the Rubh' a'Chromain which is formed of felsite, basalt and xenoliths.

== Flora and fauna ==
The flora, a distinct feature on the road to the bay, is of wild strawberry and scented woodbine. The fauna noted during the low tide in the bay are oystercatcher and terns Other fauna reported are wild goats, golden eagles and sea eagles and also kittiwakes and fulmars which breed here.

== Media and the arts ==
Carsaig Pier and the boathouses, together with Carsaig House, feature extensively in the 1945 film I Know Where I'm Going!, as does the incongruous telephone box next to the waterfall.
