= Songs of Praise (hymnal) =

1925 Anglican hymnal

Songs of Praise is a 1925 hymnal compiled by Percy Dearmer, Martin Shaw and Ralph Vaughan Williams. The popular English Hymnal of 1906 was considered too 'High church' by many people, and a new book on broader lines was indicated. It was initially to be called Songs of the Spirit but in the end the title was changed to Songs of Praise, from the hymn by J. Montgomery, "Songs of Praise the angels sang". Musically, it deliberately omitted several Victorian hymn tunes and substituted "modal" tunes by Shaw and Gustav Holst and descants by Vaughan Williams and by Martin Shaw's brother Geoffrey Shaw.

It was hoped by the editors that the book would be found suitable for children and this proved to be the case; during the 20th century it was widely used in schools in the UK. Many educational authorities used the book, and the national character of Songs of Praise was established and the book was adopted by a number of churches. Education Authorities and others began to press for the inclusion of extra hymns. By 1929 the question of enlargement had become urgent, and a special committee was formed to do the work. As well as the three editors it included Canon Briggs, Mr Noel Burghes, Canon Dwelly, Dr R.C. Gillie, Mrs Maxtone Graham (Jan Struther) and Mr. W. Charter Piggott. Mrs Martin Shaw acted as secretary. In 1931 this second, enlarged edition was published, which included for the first time the hymn "Morning Has Broken", written especially for this edition by the English author Eleanor Farjeon, and set to the traditional Scottish Gaelic tune, "Bunessan".

In 1933 Songs of Praise Discussed by Percy Dearmer was published by Oxford University Press. This is an invaluable commentary on the literature of hymns and provides some entertaining reading. Notes on the music were provided by Archibald Jacob.

== See also ==
- Anglican church music
- List of English-language hymnals by denomination
