= Aird of Kinloch =

- Coordinates: 56°23′10″N 6°0′40″W
- Country: UK

Aird of Kinloch (Gaelic:An Àird) is a rocky outcrop between Loch Scridain and Loch Beg on the Isle of Mull, Argyll and Bute, Scotland.
