= Bunessan (hymn tune) =

Hymn tune based on a Scottish folk melody

Bunessan is a hymn tune based on a Scottish folk melody, first associated with the Christmas carol "Child in the Manger" and later and more commonly with "Morning Has Broken". It is named after the village of Bunessan on the Isle of Mull.

== History ==
Mary MacDonald (Màiri Dhòmhnallach in Scottish Gaelic) (1789–1872), who lived in the crofting community of Ardtun near Bunessan in the Ross of Mull and spoke only Gaelic, wrote her hymn "Leanabh an Àigh" to a traditional melody. When the words were translated into English in the 1880s, the melody was named after the village of Bunessan by the translator, Lachlan Macbean. A monument to MacDonald can be seen about 1.5 miles east of the village, on the road towards Craignure. The ruins of the house where she lived are also nearby.

"Bunessan" is also used for the James Quinn hymns, "Christ Be Beside Me" and "This Day God Gives Me," both of which were adapted from the traditional Irish hymn "St Patrick's Breastplate", and for Michael Saward's hymn "Baptized In Water".

Sometime before 1927 Alexander Fraser heard the melody in the Scottish Highlands and wrote it down so that it came to the attention of Percy Dearmer, Ralph Vaughan Williams, and Martin Shaw. In turn, these editors of the hymn book Songs of Praise requested Eleanor Farjeon to write a further hymn text to the tune. This was "Morning Has Broken", and since 1931 the tune has become most familiarly identified with this hymn. In 1971, a version of "Morning Has Broken" was recorded by English singer Cat Stevens, helping popularise the tune.
