= Morning Has Broken =

1931 Christian hymn

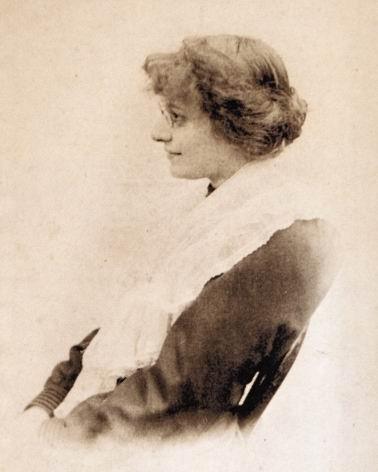
- Eleanor Farjeon circa 1899
- Genre: Christian hymn (composer Martin Shaw)
- Text: Eleanor Farjeon
- Language: English
- Meter: 5.5.5.4 D
- Melody: "Bunessan"
- Performed: 1931

"Morning Has Broken" is a Christian hymn first published in 1931. It has words by English author Eleanor Farjeon and was inspired by the village of Alfriston in East Sussex, then set to a traditional Scottish Gaelic tune, "Bunessan".

English pop musician and folk singer Cat Stevens included a version on his album Teaser and the Firecat (1971). The song became identified with Stevens due to the popularity of this recording. It reached number six on the U.S. Billboard Hot 100, number one on the U.S. easy listening chart in 1972, and number four on the Canadian RPM magazine charts.

== Origins ==
The hymn originally appeared in the second edition of Songs of Praise (published in 1931), to the tune "Bunessan", composed in the Scottish Islands. In Songs of Praise Discussed, the editor, Percy Dearmer, explains that as there was need for a hymn to give thanks for each day, English poet and children's author Eleanor Farjeon had been "asked to make a poem to fit the lovely Scottish tune." Farjeon later included a slight variation on the original hymn text under the new title, "A Morning Song (For the First Day of Spring)", in her collection of poems for children entitled The Children's Bells, published by Oxford University Press in 1957. The song is noted in 9/4 time but with a 3/4 feel.

After appearing in Lachlan MacBean's Songs and Hymns of the Gael, "Bunessan" was used in the Revised Church Hymnary (1927) and the Appendix (1936) to the Irish Church Hymnal (1919) paired with the nativity text "Child in the Manger" by the Scottish poet Mary MacDonald (1789–1872), who lived on the Isle of Mull and was born there, near the village of Bunessan, after which the tune is named. After its rise to popularity with Farjeon's text, the tune was used for the James Quinn hymns "Christ Be Beside Me" and "This Day God Gives Me", both texts adapted from the traditional Irish hymn "St Patrick's Breastplate". Michael Saward's hymn "Baptized In Water" also uses the tune.

== Cat Stevens recording ==
"Morning Has Broken"

Single by Cat Stevens

from the album Teaser and the Firecat
- B-side: "I Want to Live in a Wigwam"
- Released: 1972
- Recorded: March 1971
- Studio: Morgan Studios, London
- Genre: Folk-pop
- Length: 3:20
- Label: Island (UK/Europe); A&M (US/Canada)
- Songwriters: Arranger: Cat Stevens; Lyrics: Eleanor Farjeon; Music: Bunessan (traditional); Additional music: Rick Wakeman
- Producer: Paul Samwell-Smith

Cat Stevens singles chronology
"Ruby Love" (1971)	"Morning Has Broken" (1972)	"The First Cut Is the Deepest" (1972)

Official lyric video "Morning Has Broken" on YouTube

Cat Stevens' recording, with piano arranged and performed by Rick Wakeman, led to international recognition of the song.

When shaping "Morning Has Broken" for recording, Stevens started with the hymn, which took around 45 seconds to sing in its basic form. Producer Paul Samwell-Smith told him he could never put something like that on an album, and that it had to be at least three minutes, though an acoustic demo of an early Stevens version lasts almost three minutes. Prior to the actual recording Stevens heard Wakeman play a rough sketch of what would later become "Catherine Howard" from his album The Six Wives of Henry VIII (1973). Stevens told Wakeman that he liked it and wanted something similar as the opening section, the closing section and, if possible, a middle section as well. Wakeman told Stevens he could not as it was his piece destined for a solo album, but Stevens persuaded him to adapt his composition. The single reached #9 on the UK Singles Chart and #6 on the US Billboard Hot 100 in 1972, becoming Stevens's most successful single on the latter chart (later tied by his rendition of "Another Saturday Night").

In 2000, Wakeman released an instrumental version of "Morning Has Broken" on an album of the same title. That same year he gave an interview on BBC Radio 5 Live in which he said he had agreed to perform on the Cat Stevens track for £10 and was "shattered" that he was omitted from the credits, adding that he never received the money either. Wakeman said that in 2002, Stevens apologised for the original non-payment and had the record company pay him. Wakeman gave the money to one of Stevens' schools. In March 2020, the pair performed the song at the Music for the Marsden charity concert at the O2 Arena in London.

On a documentary aired on British television, Wakeman stated that he felt Stevens's version of "Morning Has Broken" was a very beautiful piece of music that had brought people closer to religious truth, for which he expressed satisfaction in having contributed. Wakeman included a 3:42 version on his 2017 album of piano arrangements, Piano Portraits.

The Stevens arrangement changes key four times, with the first, second, and fourth verses of the song in C major, while the instrumental introduction, third verse, and the instrumental ending are in D major.

== Chart history ==
=== Weekly charts ===
Chart (1972)	Peak position
Australia (Kent Music Report)	4
Canada RPM Top Singles	4
Canada RPM Adult Contemporary	11
Ireland (IRMA)	6
Netherlands	5
Norway	4
New Zealand	3
South Africa (Springbok)	5
UK (OCC)	9
US Billboard Hot 100	6
US Billboard Adult Contemporary	1
US Cash Box Top 100	11

=== Year-end charts ===
Chart (1972)	Rank
Australia	28
Canada Top Singles (RPM)	38
UK	97
US Billboard Hot 100	44

== Certifications ==
Region	Certification	Certified units/sales
Denmark (IFPI Danmark)	Gold	45,000^{‡}
New Zealand (RMNZ)	Platinum	30,000^{‡}
United Kingdom (BPI)	Silver	200,000^{‡}
^{‡} Sales+streaming figures based on certification alone.

== Other versions ==
The song has been recorded by many other artists, including The New Seekers, Judith Durham, Steven Curtis Chapman, Judy Collins, Michael Card, Floyd Cramer, Dana, Neil Diamond, Órla Fallon, Art Garfunkel, Ellen Greene, Esther Ofarim, Daliah Lavi, Joe Longthorne, Jojje Wadenius and Anni-Frid Lyngstad (2010), The Tabernacle Choir at Temple Square, Nana Mouskouri, Aaron Neville, Kenny Rogers and the First Edition, Joseph McManners, Sister Janet Mead, Mary O'Hara, Demis Roussos, Third Day, The Brilliance, Pam Tillis, Hayley Westenra, Roger Whittaker, 2nd Chapter of Acts, Libera (choir), Richard Souther and Dana Winner. A version by Isleville Symphonette reached No. 24 in the Canadian AC charts.

The song has been translated into German ("Schön ist der Morgen", performed by Nana Mouskouri, and by Jürgen Henkys "Morgenlicht leuchtet" and included in the hymnal of the Protestant Church in Germany, Evangelisches Gesangbuch, under Nr. 455, and also in the hymnal of the Protestant (Reformed) Church of Switzerland, RG (reformiertes Gesangbuch), under Nr. 533. Also, the song has been translated into French ("Matin brisé", performed by Eva on her 1972 album L'orage), Dutch (Licht Op De Lakes performed by Rowwen Hèze) and other languages.

== See also ==
- List of Billboard Easy Listening number ones of 1972
- Christian child's prayer § Morning Prayer
