= Bridal Path (novel) =

1952 novel by Nigel Tranter

- First edition (publ. Ward Lock & Co)
- Author: Nigel Tranter
- Cover artist: Val Biro
- Language: English
- Publisher: Ward Lock & Co
- Publication date: 1952
- Publication place: United Kingdom
- Pages: 220 (first edition)
- OCLC: 504436993

Bridal Path is a novel by Scottish author Nigel Tranter, first published in 1952. In 1959 a film version The Bridal Path was released.

The story begins on Eorsa, an island in the Inner Hebrides of Scotland. Ewan MacEwan, a widower and father of two, is in need of a wife. Related to everyone on the island, he travels to the mainland in search of a suitable woman. His adventures are bizarre and comedic, involving poachers, police, imprisonments and escapes. After many adventures he eventually finds true love in the most unexpected manner.

== Adaptation ==
The novel was adapted for film by the British Lion Film Corporation in 1959. It starred Bill Travers, George Cole and Gordon Jackson, it was produced and directed by Frank Launder and Sidney Gilliat.

Geoffrey Willans co-wrote the screenplay, but died before the film was released.

The film was shot on location around Oban, Easdale and Appin. It premiered in Edinburgh.

== Release details ==
First published in 1952 by Hodder & Stoughton. Republished in 1992 by B & W Publishing.
