= Kintra =

Settlement on the Isle of Mull, Scotland

Coordinates: 56.343°N 6.349°W

Kintra: Scottish Gaelic: Ceann na Tràgha
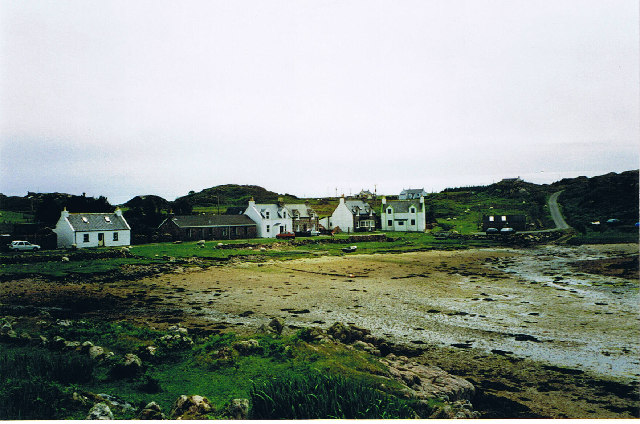
- Kintra, houses and the foreshore

- Location within Argyll and Bute
- OS grid reference: NM312252
- Civil parish: Kilfinichen and Kilvickeon
- Council area: Argyll and Bute
- Lieutenancy area: Argyll and Bute
- Country: Scotland
- Sovereign state: United Kingdom
- Post town: ISLE OF MULL
- Postcode district: PA66
- Dialling code: 01681
- Police: Scotland
- Fire: Scottish
- Ambulance: Scottish
- UK Parliament: Argyll, Bute and South Lochaber
- Scottish Parliament: Argyll and Bute

Kintra (Scottish Gaelic: Ceann na Tràgha), meaning "head of the beach" in Scottish Gaelic, is a settlement on the North-Western coast of the Ross of Mull, Scotland. The settlement is within the parish of Kilfinichen and Kilvickeon. It has approximately 15 permanent residents, in addition to seasonal or recreational visitors. Most of the settlement is in the form of a line of houses parallel to the shore (a small, unpaved road, low defense wall and grassy area separate the beach from the houses).

The size of the beach is very much dependent on the tide: at high tide, there may be no beach and much of the grassy area is submerged. At low tide, there may be up to 50 m of beach. The bay in which Kintra resides is sheltered by numerous, small islands and outcrops composed of local granite stones. Kintra lies about 2 miles north east of Fionnphort (near Iona).
