= Ardtun =

Coordinates: 56.329°N 6.215°W

Ardtun: Scottish Gaelic: Àird Tunna
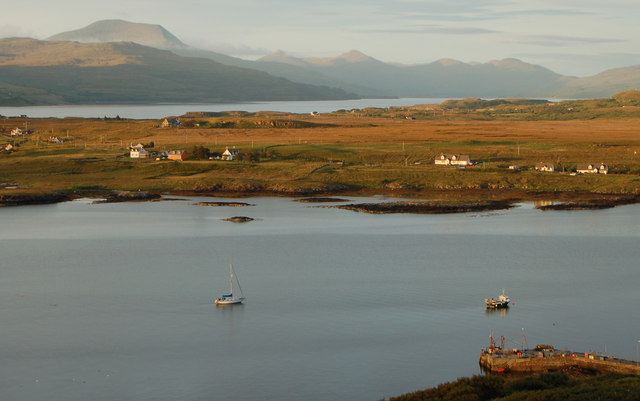
- Loch na Lathaich and Ardtun, with Loch Scridain and Ben More in the background

- Location within Argyll and Bute
- OS grid reference: NM394231
- Civil parish: Kilfinichen and Kilvickeon
- Council area: Argyll and Bute
- Lieutenancy area: Argyll and Bute
- Country: Scotland
- Sovereign state: United Kingdom
- Post town: ISLE OF MULL
- Postcode district: PA67
- Dialling code: 01681
- Police: Scotland
- Fire: Scottish
- Ambulance: Scottish
- UK Parliament: Argyll, Bute and South Lochaber
- Scottish Parliament: Argyll and Bute

Ardtun (Scottish Gaelic: Àird Tunna) is a settlement on the Isle of Mull, in Argyll and Bute, Scotland. Ardtun is within the parish of Kilfinichen and Kilvickeon.
