= Inch Kenneth =

Island off the west coast of the Isle of Mull in Scotland

Innis Choinnich (Gaelic)
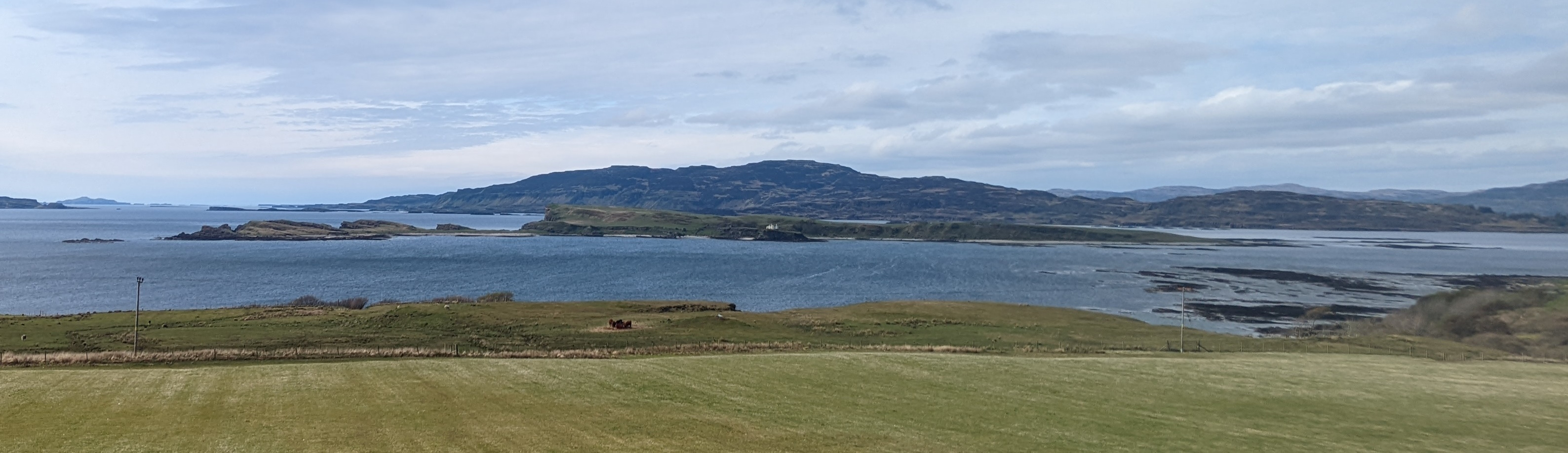
- View from Mull: Inch Kenneth is the long island in the middle; Ulva is prominently visible behind it

Location
- Inch Kenneth shown next to Mull
- OS grid reference: NM435355
- Coordinates: 56.44171°N 6.16317°W

Name
- Name meaning: Island of Kenneth

Physical geography
- Island group: Inner Hebrides
- Area: 55 ha (1/4 sq mi)
- Area rank: 189=
- Highest elevation: 49 m (161 ft)

Administration
- Council area: Argyll and Bute
- Country: Scotland
- Sovereign state: United Kingdom

Demographics
- Population: 0

Inch Kenneth (Scottish Gaelic: Innis Choinnich) is a small grassy island off the west coast of the Isle of Mull, in Scotland. It is at the entrance of Loch na Keal, to the south of Ulva. It is part of the Loch na Keal National Scenic Area, one of 40 in Scotland. It is within the parish of Kilfinichen and Kilvickeon, in Argyll and Bute.

== History ==
The island is named after St Kenneth, a follower of Saint Columba, who is said to have founded a monastery on the island.

== Ownership and visitors ==
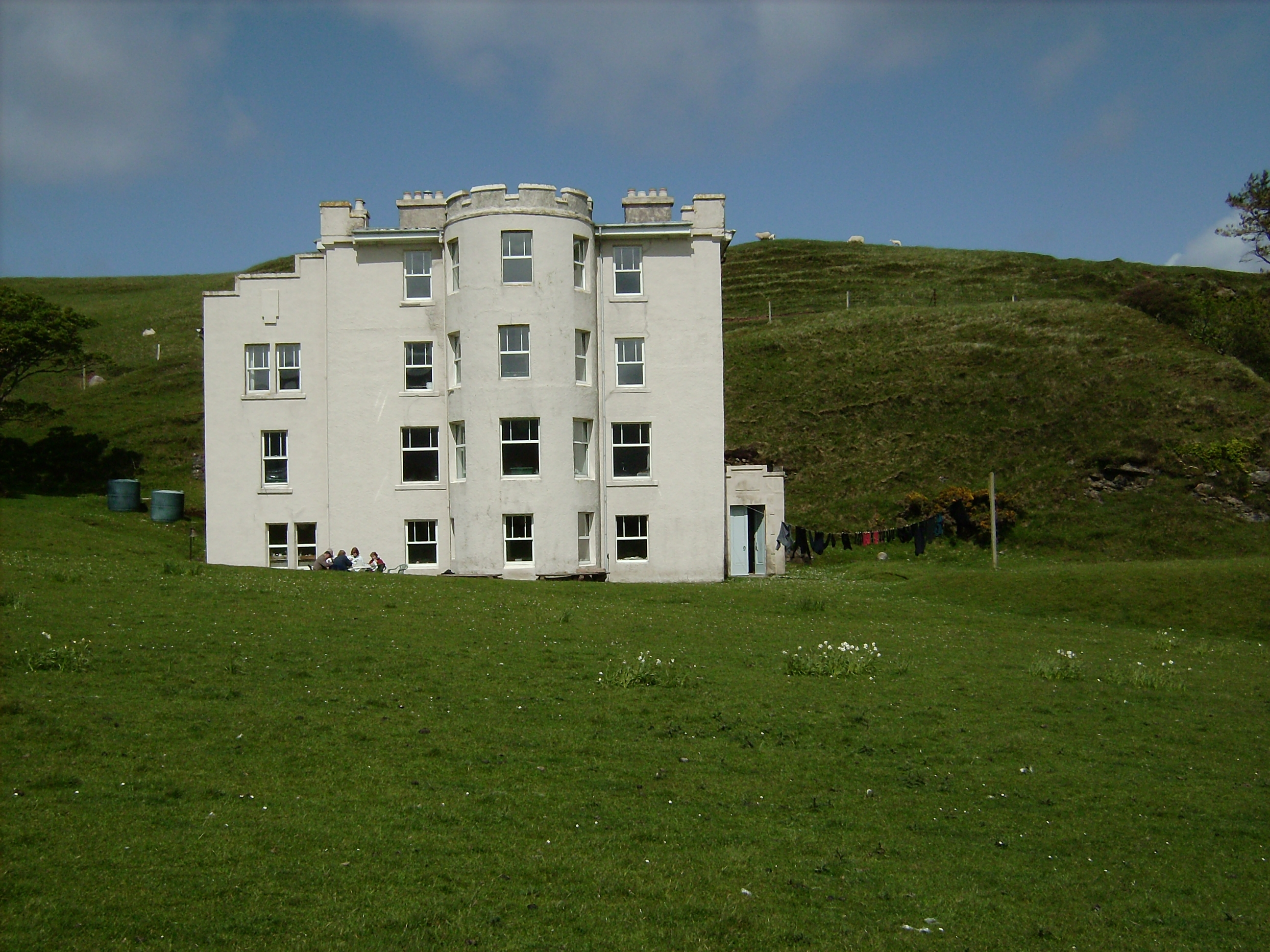
The house on Inch Kenneth

The island was visited in 1773 by Samuel Johnson and James Boswell during their tour of the Hebrides; they were entertained there by Sir Allan MacLean, head of the Maclean clan. Both Johnson and Boswell published accounts of their visit.

In the early 1930s the island was owned by Sir Harold Boulton, 2nd Baronet, the writer of the words to the Skye Boat Song. He enlarged an earlier house to make the existing mansion, dying in 1935.

The island's most celebrated subsequent owner in the twentieth century was the Mitford family. Nazi sympathiser Unity Mitford spent her final years on the island. Following the death of their father, Lord Redesdale, the island was inherited under Scots law by the surviving Mitford sisters and not his wife, as Lord Redesdale had willed it to his only son Tom, who had predeceased him. When their mother died in 1963, Nancy gave her share to Jessica, who bought the shares of Diana, Deborah and Pamela. Jessica, a former communist, teasingly suggested that it might become a Soviet submarine base.

The island was sold by Jessica in the late 1960s to Andrew Barlow, son of Sir Alan Barlow, 2nd Baronet. It remains with their family.

== Other ==
The island was a location for the 1993 feature film Walk Me Home produced by author Timothy Neat.

Inch Kenneth is classified by the National Records of Scotland as an inhabited island that "had no usual residents at the time of either the 2001 or 2011 censuses."
