= Bunessan =

Village on the Isle of Mull, Scotland

Bunessan: Scottish Gaelic: Bun Easain
- Village
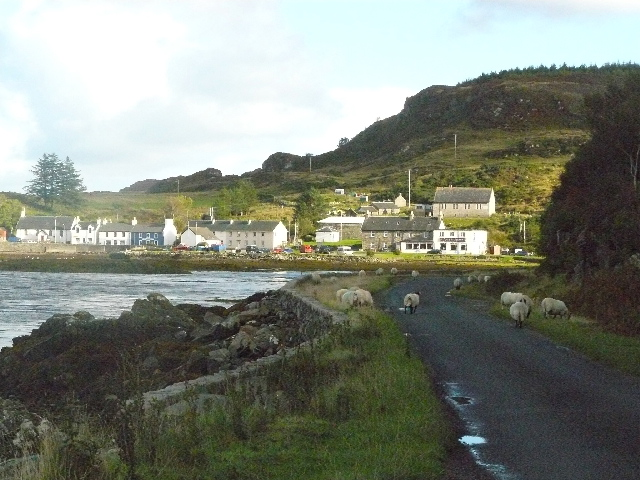
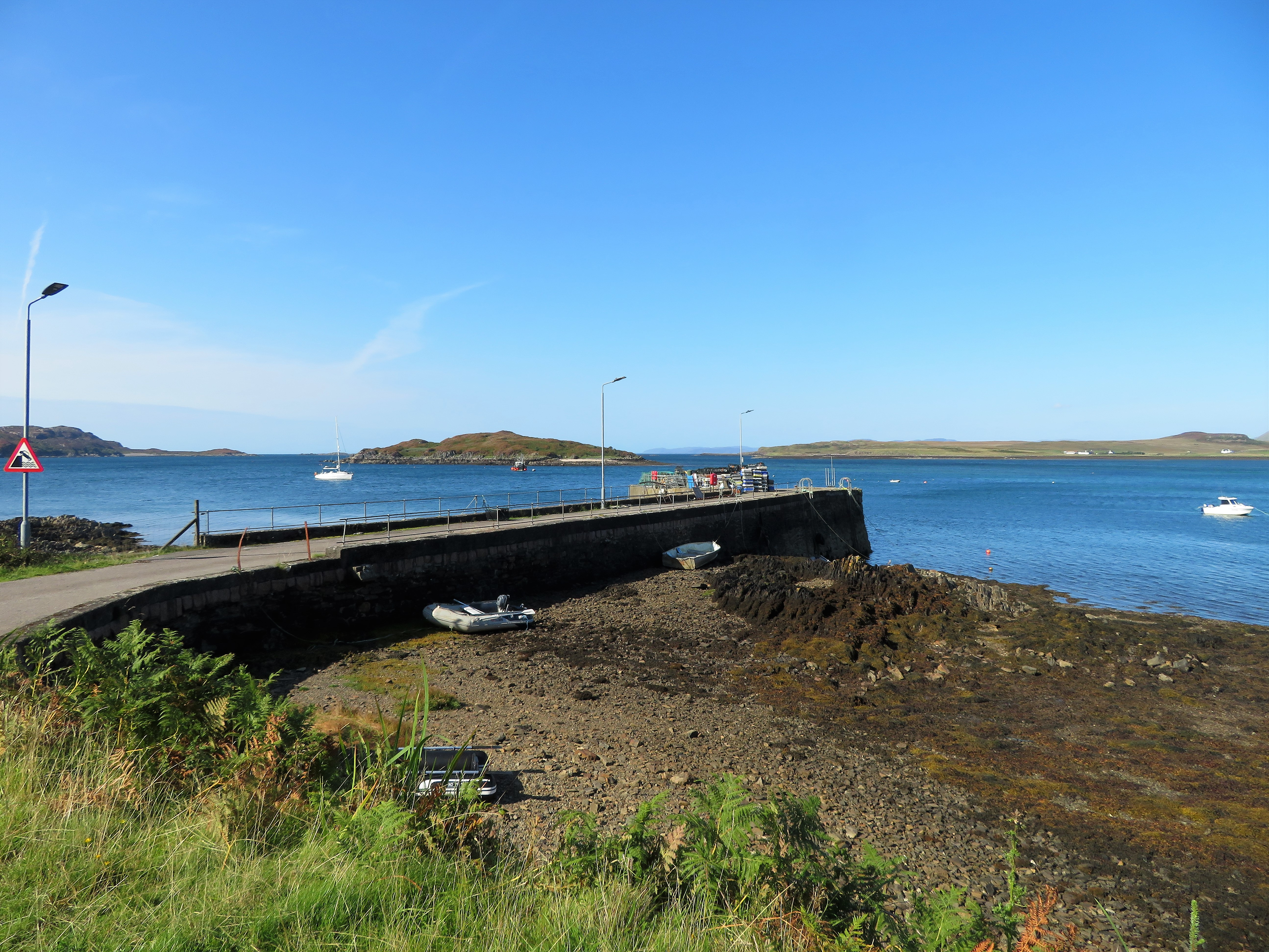
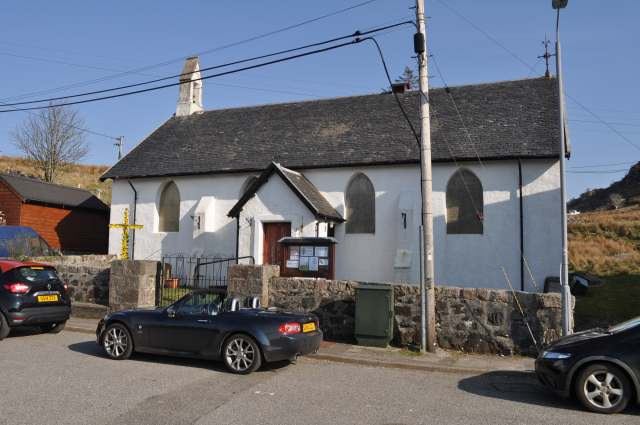
- Bunessan viewed from the Fionnphort road The 'Maize Pier' Bunessan Parish Church

- Location within Argyll and Bute
- Population: 200 (2011 estimate)
- OS grid reference: NM381217
- Civil parish: Kilfinichen and Kilvickeon
- Council area: Argyll and Bute
- Lieutenancy area: Argyll and Bute
- Country: Scotland
- Sovereign state: United Kingdom
- Post town: ISLE OF MULL
- Postcode district: PA67
- Dialling code: 01681
- Police: Scotland
- Fire: Scottish
- Ambulance: Scottish
- UK Parliament: Argyll, Bute and South Lochaber
- Scottish Parliament: Argyll and Bute
- Bunessan Lighthouse; Eileanan Liathanaitch; Gray Islands
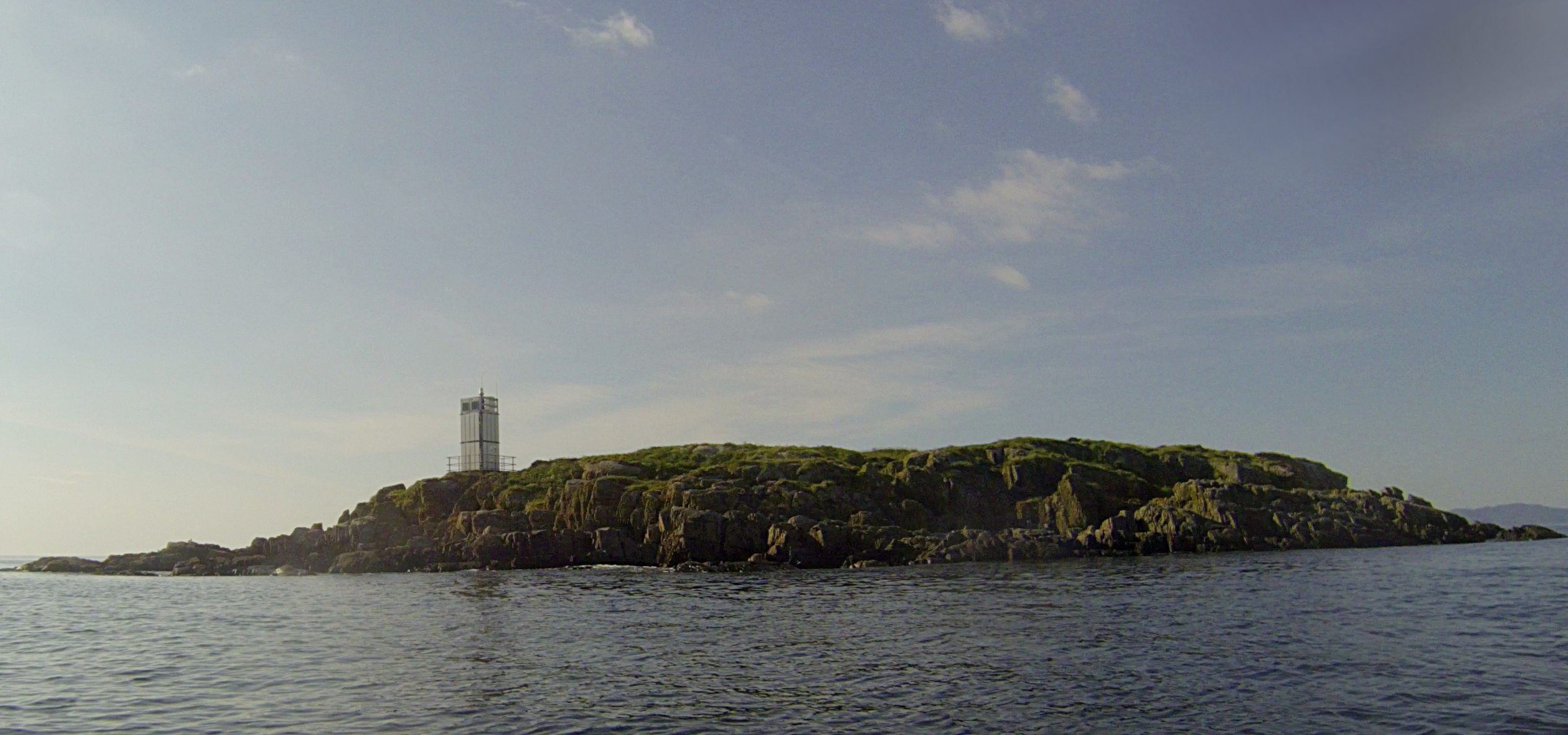
- Coordinates: 56.342770°N 6.272858°W
- Constructed: 1901 (first)
- Construction: metal skeletal tower
- Automated: 2001
- Height: 5 metres (16 ft)
- Shape: quadrangular tower with aluminium panels as daymark
- Markings: white tower
- Operator: Northern Lighthouse Board
- First lit: 2001 (current)
- Deactivated: 2001 (first)
- Focal height: 12 metres (39 ft)
- Range: 8 nmi (15 km; 9.2 mi) (white), 6 nmi (11 km; 6.9 mi) (red)
- Characteristic: Fl WR 6s.

Bunessan (Note: Scottish Gaelic: Bun Easain), meaning "bottom of the waterfall",) is a small village on the Ross of Mull, a peninsula in the south-west of the Isle of Mull, off the west coast of Scotland. The settlement is at OS grid reference NM382217, within the parish of Kilfinichen and Kilvickeon, and is situated on the A849, at the head of a cove at the southern end of Loch na Làthaich.

== History ==
The village was established by John Campbell, 5th Duke of Argyll in the late 1700s as a fishing station with a mixed crofting-fishing economy. In 1782, the corn and potato crops in the area were devastated by severe frost and early snow, causing many people to go to the Lowlands to seek work. By 1845, Bunessan had reached a population of 250.

Bunessan Church, a C listed building today, was built in 1804.

Construction of the pier, dubbed the "Maize Pier", began and was completed in 1846 by local workers using granite quarried at the north side of the bay. This new pier allowed for larger boats to use the port. The name "Maize Pier" originates from the fact that the Highland Potato Famine had already begun by the time the pier was being built, so workers were paid using Indian corn, also known as maize, which became a staple food of the workers. With the construction of the pier, Bunessan became the main port of the local area, with vessels linking it to larger ports such as Tobermory and Oban. This became the main port of access to the Ross of Mull for a long time, however as modern roads were built, commercial sailings to the village became less and less often. Today, no commercial sailings serve Bunessan, however it is still used by local fishermen and by pleasure craft.

== Community ==
In 2011, the village had an estimated population of 200. A village hall is used for dances throughout the year. The primary school for the Ross of Mull is found in Bunessan.

== Economy ==
Business has included crofting, a mill (now home to the Ross of Mull Historical Centre), weaving and a small fishing fleet, up to the end of the 20th century. The village still has a lobster fishery.

Bunessan village has one grocery shop and a craft shop.

It also has one hotel, The Bunessan Inn (previously named Argyll Arms) (the only pub in the area). It claims to have been established over three centuries ago (the exact date is unknown). The earliest record of the inn was in 1773 when Dr Samuel Johnson and James Boswell, on their way to the isle of Iona, stopped at the inn in search of rum or brandy; but upon asking the innkeeper they found that the supplies were empty due to a funeral a few days before. The building, which is Category C listed, is described by Historic Environment Scotland as dating from c. 1800 with mid-1960s extensions.

== Hymn tune ==
Mary Macdonald (Màiri Dhòmhnallach) from the nearby crofting community of Ardtun used a traditional local melody for her Scottish Gaelic Christmas carol titled Leanabh an Àigh. In the 1880s Lachlan Macbean translated the text as "Child in the Manger" and called the air "Bunessan". The tune was reused in the 1930s for the hymn "Morning Has Broken".

== Lighthouse ==
Bunessan lighthouse is located on a skerry of Gray Island in the entrance to Loch na Làthaich and the harbour of Bunessan. The present lighthouse is a metal skeletal tower covered by white aluminium panel as a daymark and the light on the top. The light emits a white or red flash, depending on the direction every six seconds.

== See also ==
- List of lighthouses in Scotland
- List of Northern Lighthouse Board lighthouses
