= Ben More (Mull) =

966m high mountain in Scotland

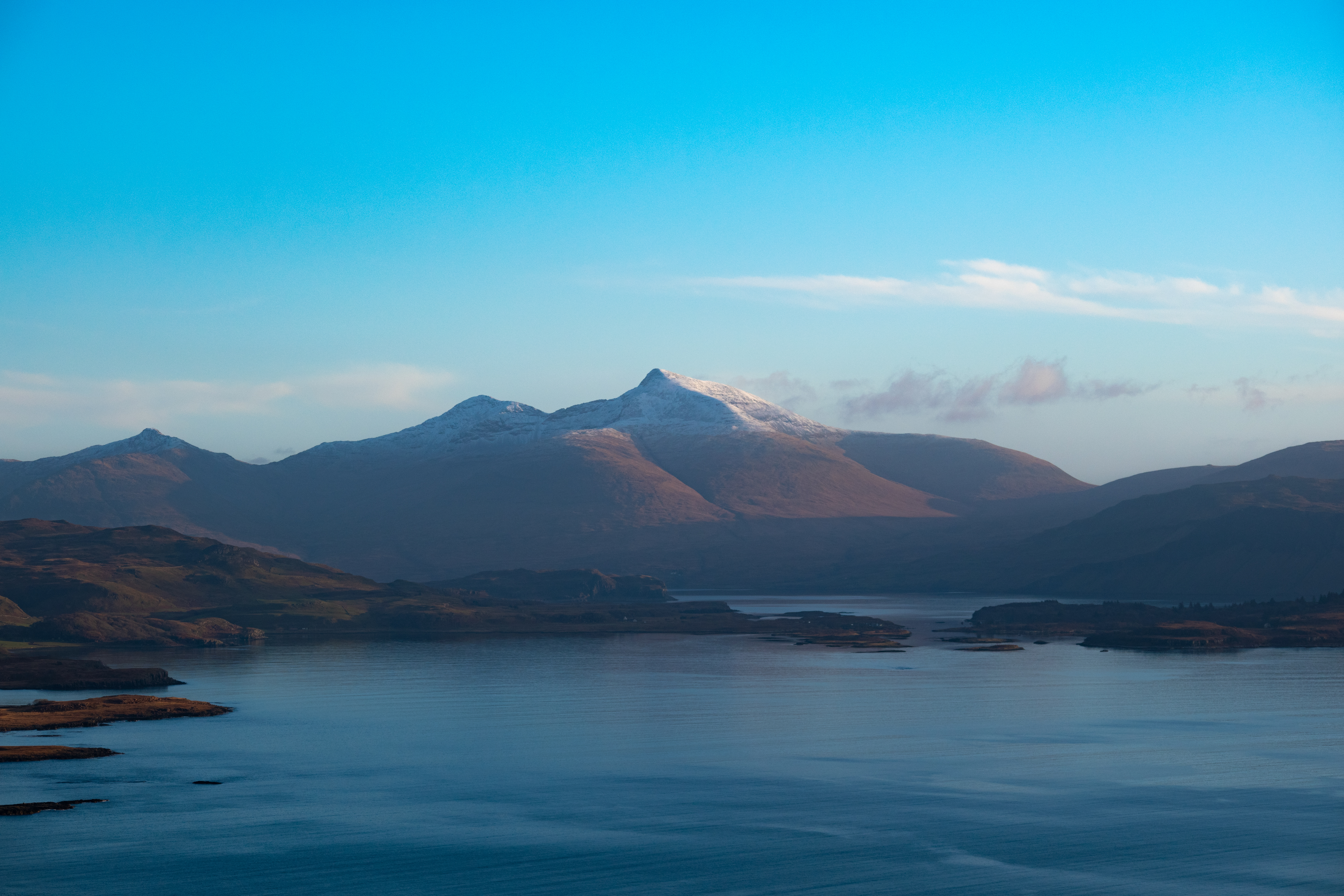
- Ben More from north of Loch Tuath

Highest point
- Elevation: 966 m (3,169 ft)
- Prominence: 966 m (3,169 ft); Ranked 7th in British Isles
- Parent peak: none – HP Mull
- Listing: Marilyn, Munro
- Coordinates: 56°25′29″N 6°00′48″W

Naming
- Native name: Beinn Mhòr (Scottish Gaelic)
- English translation: Big mountain
- Pronunciation: Scottish Gaelic: [peɲ ˈvoːɾ]

Geography
- Location within Mull
- Location: Isle of Mull, Scotland
- OS grid: NM525330
- Topo map: OS Landranger 47, 48

Ben More (Scottish Gaelic: Beinn Mhòr, meaning "great mountain") is the highest mountain and only Munro (mountains in Scotland that reach an elevation of at least 3,000 feet or 914.4 metres) on the Isle of Mull, Scotland. It is also the highest peak in the Scottish isles – and the only Munro – apart from those on the Isle of Skye. The mountain is situated close to the centre of the island, above the shores of Loch na Keal.

== Access and climbing route ==
The peak is reached most easily from Loch na Keal, the walk up from the B8035 road following farm tracks, the side of a stream; Abhainn Dhiseig, and ultimately up scree slopes to the top. From the summit on a clear day, the view encompasses the Sound of Mull, Staffa, Ulva, the Ross of Mull and Iona in the distance. From sea loch to summit is approximately a four-hour walk.

The more demanding but rewarding route follows a boggy path up the banks of Abhainn na h-Uamha to the bealach (mountain pass) between A' Chìoch ("The Breast") and Beinn Fhada (not to be confused with its namesake in Kintail). From the bealach the route follows South West along a steep and rocky ridge first to the peak of A' Chìoch then on and up to Ben More itself. There is respite at the top in a circular refuge of stones. This route starts and ends on the B8035 road and is approximately a six-hour walk and scramble.

Climbers should be cautious when using a compass in misty conditions since there is magnetic rock in places, especially near the summit of the mountain.

== Geology ==
Around 60 million years ago, the region was volcanically active, with Ben More being the remnant of a volcano, and it was in this period that the famous rock formations of Staffa and the basaltic columns of "The Castles" on Ulva came into being. The lava flows are known as the "Staffa Magma Type member" and can also be seen on Mull at Carsaig, Ardtum, and near Tobermory on its east coast. They are particularly rich in silica.

== See also ==
- Breast-shaped hill
