= Alan Brebner =

Scottish civil engineer

- Born: 4 August 1826; Edinburgh, Scotland
- Died: 5 March 1890 (aged 63)
- Occupation: Civil engineer
- Known for: Lighthouse engineering
- Spouse: Francis Ann McKay Brebner (m.1850)

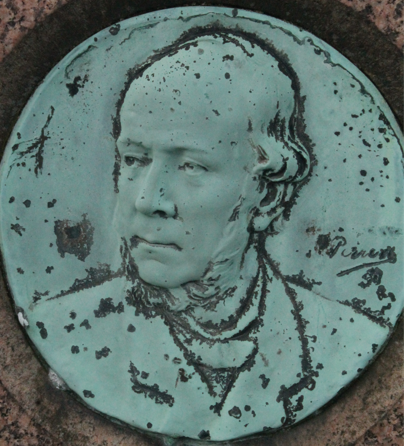
Medallion head on grave of Alan Brebner, Rosebank Cemetery, Edinburgh

Alan Brebner MInstCE (4 August 1826 – 5 March 1890) was a Scottish civil engineer, primarily associated with the Stevenson family who designed and built the majority of lighthouses in and around Scotland over several generations.

== Early life ==
Brebner was born in Edinburgh on 4 August 1826 to Alexander Brebner (1776–1859) and his wife, Margaret Lawson. He attended Edinburgh High School.

His father - Alexander Brebner - worked for Robert Stevenson and the Northern Lighthouse Board as a mason from 1807 to 1810, during the construction of the pioneering Bell Rock Lighthouse. Brebner's role was referenced by Robert Louis Stevenson in his account of his grandfather's magnum opus: "The stowing of the materials upon the rock was the department of Alexander Brebner, mason, who spared no pains in attending to the safety of the stones, and who, in the present state of the work, when the stones were landed faster than could be built, generally worked till the water rose to his middle".

== Professional career ==
Brebner followed in his father's footsteps and began a regular apprenticeship as a mason, from which he gained a practical knowledge of building construction.

Following successful completion of the Bell Rock lighthouse in 1810, Robert Stevenson became inundated with requests, both for further lighthouses and other civil engineering projects. Initially, he conducted the engineering work largely by himself, but recognising the opportunity behind his newfound prestige began to build relationships with a select group of known workmen, who became apprenticed to him. Likely through his familial connection to the Bell Rock, Alan Brebner became such an apprentice and began to develop as a civil engineer in his own right. Brebner was associated with the Stevenson family engineering firm for the remainder of his life, apart from a brief absence between 1848 and 1850 where he acted as resident engineer for railway works between Thornton and Dunfermline.

=== Muckle Flugga ===
Following Robert Stevenson's death and the decline of his eldest son, Alan, work for the Northern Lighthouse board passed to his other sons: David and Thomas. At this point, Brebner was also promoted to deputy engineer, making him the most senior non-Stevenson at the firm.

In 1854 Brebner was appointed resident engineer for the construction of the Muckle Flugga lighthouse in the northern Shetlands. The project was initiated at the request of the British government, who determined a light necessary to aid Royal Navy vessels en route towards Scandinavia and Russia during the Crimean War. Initially only a temporary light was to be constructed, but this was promoted to a permanent one in consideration of the ferocious weather conditions and remoteness of the site. Over 100 tons of material for construction, such as cement, coal, iron and glass had to be carried up the cliffs on the backs of labourers. Given such difficulties, Brebner was praised by David Stevenson in a letter to the commissioners of the Northern Lighthouse Board for ensuring the project reached successful completion in 1857.

=== Dubh Artach ===
Brebner was also resident engineer for Thomas Stevenson's Dubh Artach lighthouse from 1867 to 1872. Workman's cottages were built on the islet of Erraid and occupied by approximately 50 workmen under his supervision. From there, it was a fourteen-mile sail to the skerry upon which the lighthouse would be constructed. The first task was to construct a temporary wood and iron barrack for the workmen on the skerry. The sea beat against Dubh Artach so ferociously that the working year was limited to three months in mid-summer. Even during this time, summer gales could result in breaking water falling on the barrack roof 23m above sea level. Indeed, having seized upon a spell of good weather, Brebner and thirteen workmen were caught unawares and became stranded in the barrack for six days. At one moment sea water burst through the trapdoor on the bottom of the barrack terrifying the workmen before retreating with most of their remaining food supplies.

The project also coincided with the brief apprenticeship of Robert Louis Stevenson in the family business, who visited in 1870 and noted "it was strange to see our Sabbath services, held, as they were, in one of the bothies, with Mr Brebner reading at a table, and the congregation perched about in the double tier of sleeping bunks". Though Robert Louis Stevenson's involvement in the family business was brief, his time on Erraid left a lasting impression: Erraid features in his novella The Merry Men, and is where the shipwrecked protagonist, David Balfour, is washed ashore in Kidnapped.

Upon completion of the lighthouse, Brebner was again praised for his efforts – this time by Thomas Stevenson who noted:

It would be ungenerous if a great and dangerous work like this were brought unsuccessfully to an end and no praise should be given to such men as Mr Brebner the resident Superintendent, Mr MacGregor the captain of the steamer, Mr Goodwillie the master-builder on the rock and Mr Irvine the landing master.

=== Partnership in Stevenson firm ===
Brebner also had some oversight of the Chicken Rock lighthouse at the southern end of the Isle of Man, constructed between 1868 and 1875. As well as these large projects, Brebner was heavily involved in the Stevenson's more conventional civil engineering projects including the design and execution of multiple harbours, docks and other works, such as Wick harbour.

Though he rarely wrote on engineering matters, Brebner provided valuable to other members of the Stevenson firm in the preparation of their books on harbours, canals, river engineering, lighthouse construction and illumination. Primarily working in collaboration with Thomas Stevenson, Brebner contributed many improvements – both masonry and optical – in lighthouse design. Examples include an improved method for connecting the stone courses at Dhu Heartach; apparatus for comparing the power of lights; experiments aiding the uptake of paraffin as a fuel source for lights; "back prisms", which were communicated to the Royal Scottish Society of Arts by Thomas Stevenson in 1867; and a "refraction protractor” which allowed prisms for lighthouses to be laid approximately twice as quickly as previously. The few papers he did produce were well received: he won a medal for "Modern Harbour Construction", read before the Royal Scottish Society of Arts in 1887 and is listed as winner of the Telford Medal for a paper on the "Relative Power of Lighthouse Lenses".

By 1878, David and Thomas Stevenson were beginning to suffer bouts of ill health and were nearing retirement. Alan Brebner, along with David's son David Alan Stevenson therefore became full partners in the Stevenson engineering business, and were followed by David's second son Charles Stevenson in 1886. In the same year, Brebner was also elected a member of the Institute of Civil Engineers. The firm's expertise in lighthouse engineering had now begun to spread globally. They had already undertook work in India and, in 1868, had despatched Richard Henry Burton to Japan and now commissions were arriving from New Zealand and China. During this period, much of the engineering decisions were made by Brebner and with the deaths of David and Thomas, he became the senior partner: the business ceased to be monopolised by Stevensons. Brebner oversaw a sea-change in the Northern Lighthouse Board work, with elements increasingly subcontracted out to other firms. Furthermore, the work diversified from building and maintaining lighthouses to include foghorns, beacons and buoys.

== Family life ==
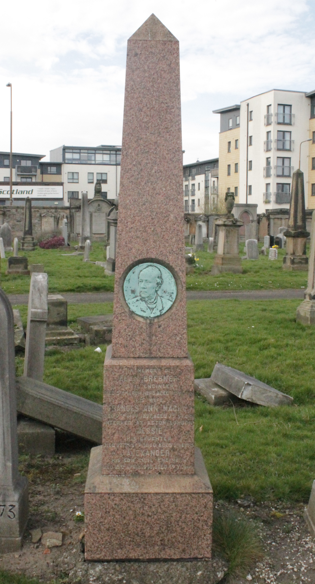
The grave of Alan Brebner, Rosebank Cemetery, Edinburgh

Brebner was married to Francis Ann McKay (1822–1897) on 5 December 1850. They had seven children. His eldest son, Alexander, also became a civil engineer specialising in harbours and docks, whilst his other son Robert emigrated to Canada.

He died at 11 Brights Crescent in south Edinburgh on 5 March 1890 after a brief period of illness. He is buried in Rosebank Cemetery along with his wife and two of his children. Over the course of his career, he worked alongside six members and three generations of the famed Stevenson family of lighthouse engineers and was the only non-family-member to become a full partner in the business.
