= Merry Men (disambiguation) =

The Merry Men are a group of legendary outlaws associated with Robin Hood.

Merry Men may also refer to:

- Merry Men: The Real Yoruba Demons, a 2018 action comedy film
- "The Merry Men" (short story), an 1882 short story by Robert Louis Stevenson
- The Merry Men and Other Tales and Fables, an 1887 collection by Stevenson
- The Merrymen, a Barbadian calypso band
