= Torran Rocks =

Archipelago in Argyll and Bute, Scotland

Na Torrain (Gaelic)

Location
- Torran Rocks within Argyll and Bute
- OS grid reference: NM266137
- Coordinates: 56.237°N 6.413°W

Name
- Name meaning: "loud murmering or thunder"

Physical geography
- Island group: Mull
- Highest elevation: c. 10 m (33 ft)

Administration
- Council area: Argyll and Bute
- Country: Scotland
- Sovereign state: United Kingdom

The Torran Rocks are a group of small islands and skerries located between the islands of Mull and Colonsay in Scotland.

== Geography and geology ==
The main rocks are Dearg Sgeir, MacPhail's Anvil, Na Torrain, Torran Sgoilte and Torr an t-Saothaid although there are numerous others including the southernmost of Sgeir Dhoirbh (or Otter Rock). They cover an area of about 25 km^{2} (10 sq mi) some 3 km (2 mi) south of the tidal island of Erraid and the Ross of Mull. The largest islets of Na Torrain reach 10 metres (33 ft) or more above sea level and are up to 150 m (490 ft) long. West Reef is made up of half a dozen skerries of orthogneiss about 2 km (1 1/4 mi) west of Na Torrain. The southern group of rocks and Ruadh Sgeir are formed from potassium-feldspar-phyric monzogranite intruded as part of the Caledonian Igneous Supersuite towards the end of the Caledonian orogeny (late Silurian to early Devonian period) and form an outlying part of the Ross of Mull pluton. Dearg Sgeir and Torr an t-Saothaid are monzogranite to granodiorite and hybridised with diorite enclaves. Na Torrain and McPhail's Anvil are formed from equigranular biotite monzogranite.

== Navigation hazard ==
Between 1867 and 1872 a lighthouse was built on the isolated reef of Dubh Artach, some 16 km (10 mi) southwest, in response to the hazards these rocks jointly presented to shipping. Between 1800 and 1854 thirty ships were wrecked on the Torrans with the loss of over fifty lives. An astonishing 24 vessels were lost in the area in a storm on 30–31 December 1865. The writer Hamish Haswell-Smith describes the rocks as "being scattered over a wide area like dragon's teeth. They lurk menacingly just beneath the surface, occasionally showing themselves in a froth of white spittle". Nicholson (1995) calls them "4 1/2 miles [7 km] of jumbled granite teeth" and that "the extent and confused nature of this reef claimed untold numbers of vessels plying between America or the Baltic ports and Oban". The reefs are so hazardous that only small boats can hope to navigate them with any degree of safety.

== In literature ==
In addition to being a hazard to navigation, they are one of the locations featured in the novel Kidnapped by Robert Louis Stevenson. It was in this "stoneyard" that Alan Breck Stewart and David Balfour were ship-wrecked. David Balfour, the hero of this tale was then marooned on neighbouring Erraid for a while. Stevenson's father, Thomas was the designer of Dubh Artach lighthouse, and the young Robert Louis knew the area well. He wrote of a "black brotherhood - the Torran reef that lies behind, between which and the shore the Iona Steamers" (taking visitors to Iona and Staffa) "have to pick their way on their return to Oban. The tourist on this trip can see upwards of 3 miles [5 kilometres] of ocean thickly sown with these fatal rocks, and the sea breaking white and heavy over some and others showing their dark heads threateningly above water".

This passage begs comparison with Kidnapped itself:

Altogether it was no such ill night to keep the seas in; and I had begun to wonder what it was that sat so heavily upon the captain, when the brig rising suddenly on the top of a high swell, he pointed and cried to us to look. Away on the lee bow, a thing like a fountain rose out of the moonlit sea, and immediately after we heard a low sound of roaring.

"What do ye call that?" asked the captain, gloomily.

"The sea breaking on a reef," said Alan. "And now ye ken where it is; and what better would ye have?"

"Ay," said Hoseason, "if it was the only one."

And sure enough, just as he spoke there came a second fountain farther to the south.

"There!" said Hoseason. "Ye see for yourself. If I had kent of these reefs, if I had had a chart, or if Shuan had been spared, it's not sixty guineas, no, nor six hundred, would have made me risk my brig in sic a stoneyard! But you, sir, that was to pilot us, have ye never a word?"

"I'm thinking," said Alan, "these'll be what they call the Torran Rocks."

"Are there many of them?" says the captain.

"Truly, sir, I am nae pilot," said Alan; "but it sticks in my mind there are ten miles [16 km] of them."

Mr. Riach and the captain looked at each other.

"There's a way through them, I suppose?" said the captain.

"Doubtless," said Alan, "but where? But it somehow runs in my mind once more that it is clearer under the land."

== Etymology ==
Haswell-Smith (2004) states that the name is derived from the Gaelic for "loud murmering or thunder" although in a different context Mac an Tàilleir describes Torrain as meaning "hillocks".
