= Dubh Artach =

Remote skerry off the west coast of Scotland

Dubh Hirteach (Gaelic)
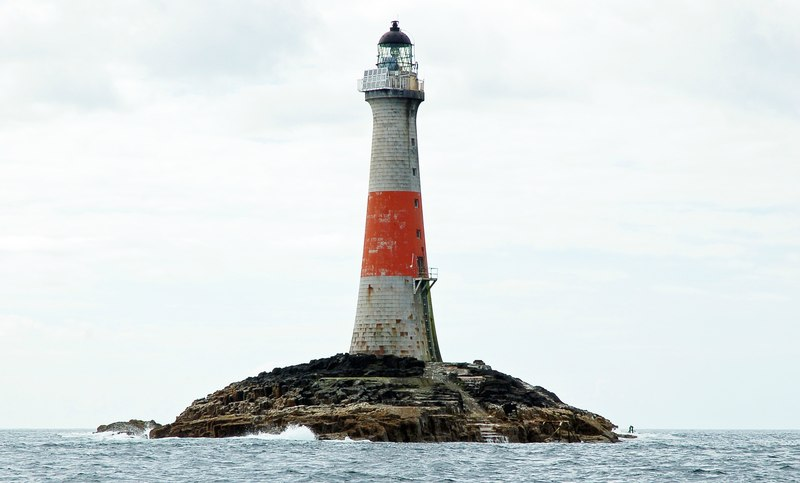
- Dubh Artach skerry and lighthouse in 2014

Location
- Dubh Artach shown within Argyll and Bute
- OS grid reference: NM119030
- Coordinates: 56.13°N 6.63°W

Name
- Gaelic pronunciation: Scottish Gaelic: [t̪u ˈhirˠʃtʃəx]
- Name meaning: The Black Rock

Physical geography
- Island group: Isle of Mull
- Area: c.32,300 square feet (3,000 m^{2})
- Highest elevation: 36 feet (11 m)

Administration
- Council area: Argyll and Bute
- Country: Scotland
- Sovereign state: United Kingdom

Demographics
- Population: 0

Dubh Artach (/duː ˈɑːrtɑːx/; Scottish Gaelic: Dubh Hirteach [t̪u ˈhirˠʃtʃəx]) is a remote skerry of basalt rock off the west coast of Scotland lying 18 miles (29 km) west of Colonsay and 15 miles (24 km) south-west of the Ross of Mull.

A lighthouse designed by Thomas Stevenson with a tower height of 145 feet (44 m) was erected between 1867 and 1872 with a shore station constructed on the isle of Erraid. The rock is subject to extraordinary sea conditions with waves of 92 feet (28 m) or more being encountered by the keepers. Despite these adverse conditions several men served the light for lengthy periods until it was automated in 1971. Dubh Artach is the official name of the lighthouse, although the skerry itself is also known as Dubh Hirteach. Various interpretations have been provided for the original meaning of the Gaelic name, of which "The Black Rock" is the most likely.

== Geology ==
In pre-historic times Dhu Heartach was covered by the ice sheets that spread from Scotland out into the Atlantic Ocean beyond the Outer Hebrides. After the last retreat of the ice around 20,000 years ago, sea levels were up to 425 feet (130 m) lower than at present. Although the isostatic rise of land makes estimating post-glacial coastlines a complex task, circa 14,000 BP it is likely that Dubh Heartach was at the western edge of a large land bridge linking what is now the island of Ireland to Scotland. This land mass included the islands of Jura and Islay and was probably connected to the mainland of Scotland by an isthmus near Loch Craignish, south of Oban.

Steadily rising sea levels would then have slowly isolated and finally all but submerged Dhu Heartach, which today is a rounded, dark green mass of basaltic rock called augite, which is 240 feet (73 m) long and 130 feet (40 m) wide, and which rises to 35 feet (11 m) above sea level. Submarine surveys indicate that the rock is at the eastern end of a valley stretching 80 miles (130 km) into the Atlantic, which may "account for the seemingly abnormal seas to which the tower is subjected". It is an isolated outpost of the Inner Hebrides archipelago. The author Robert Louis Stevenson wrote:

An ugly reef is this of the Dhu Heartach; no pleasant assemblage of shelves, and pools, and creeks, about which a child might play for a whole summer without weariness, like the Bell Rock or the Skerryvore, but one oval nodule of black-trap, sparsely bedabbled with an inconspicuous fucus, and alive in every crevice with a dingy insect between a slater and a bug. No other life was there but of sea-birds, and of the sea itself, that here ran like a mill-race, and growled about the outer reef for ever, and ever and again, in the calmest weather, roared and spouted on the rock itself.

== Meaning of the name ==
The translation of Dubh Artach is "The Black Rock", artach being a now obsolete Gaelic word for a rock or rocky ground both in Scottish Gaelic and in Irish. The variation between the anglicised forms Dubh Artach and Dhu Heartach is a simple case of false splitting where the final [h] of [t̪uh arˠʃt̪əx] in pronunciation seemingly is part of the following word, suggesting *hartach or heartach to the untrained ear.

Stevenson believed that 'black and dismal' was a translation of the name, noting that "as usual, in Gaelic, it is not the only one." Adamnan in his 7th-century Life of St Columba poetically calls the rock An Dubh Iar-stac, "The Black Stack of the West". Watson (1926) suggests the root is Old Irish hirt meaning "death", (which he also believes occurs in Hirta, the main island of the St Kilda archipelago), and offers am Duibh-hirteach, meaning "the black deadly one". The skerry was also known as St. John's Rock prior to the construction of the lighthouse.

== Planning and construction of the lighthouse ==
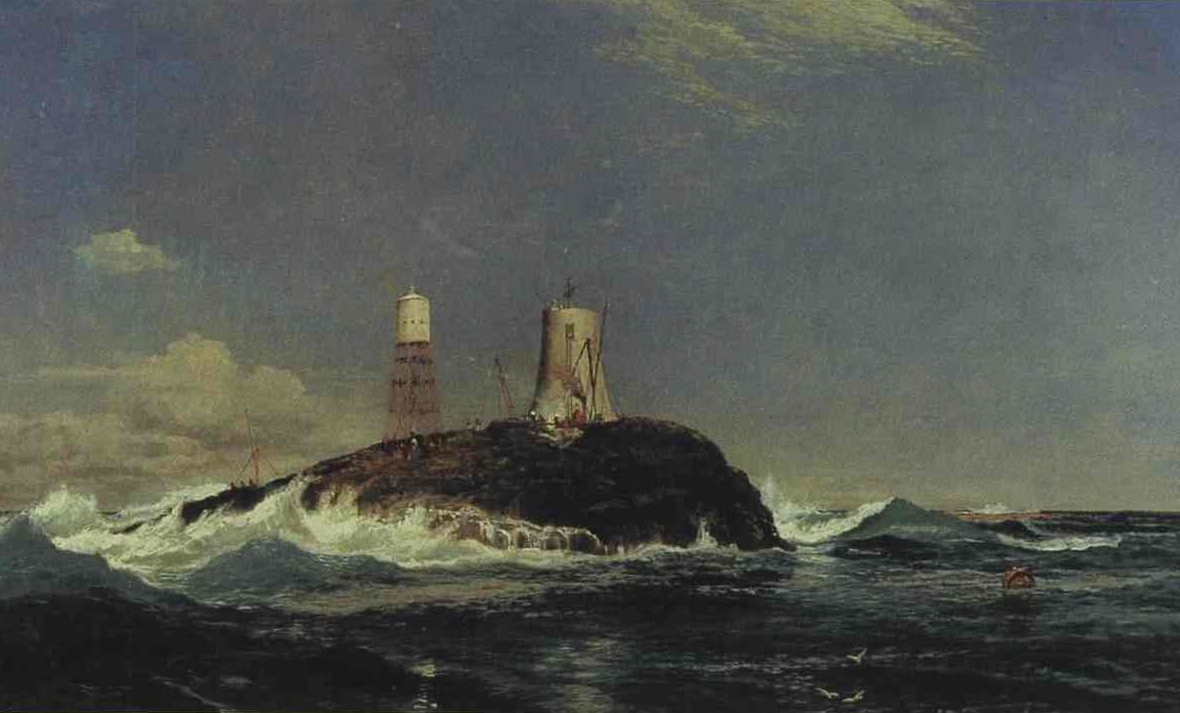
Dhu Heartach Lighthouse, During Construction by Sam Bough (1822–78)

Between 1800 and 1854 thirty ships were wrecked on the reef; however, the requirement for a lighthouse was not only to warn seafarers away from Dhu Heartach itself, but also to guide them past the fearsome Torran Rocks, which lie between the Ross of Mull and Colonsay. Originally it was considered to be an impossible site for a light, but the loss of the steamer Bussorah with all thirty-three hands on her maiden voyage in 1863 and of an astonishing 24 vessels in the area in a storm on 30–31 December 1865 encouraged positive action under pressure from insurers Lloyd's of London and a Captain Bedford of the Admiralty. The engineering work was supervised by the famous Stevenson family of engineers, the brothers Thomas (father of Robert Louis) and David commencing work in 1866. Thomas noted that "it would be a work of no ordinary magnitude".

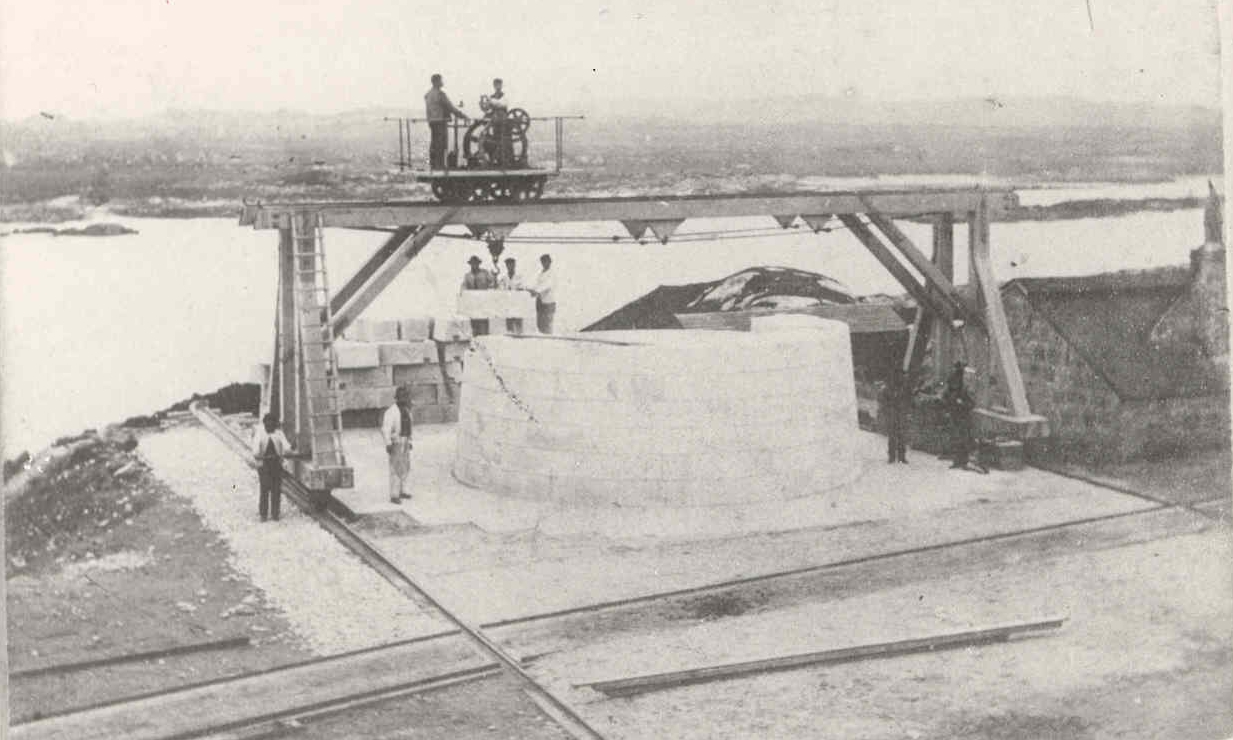
Fitting of blocks for Dubh Artach on Erraid prior to erection

The land base for the construction of the light was Erraid near Iona. Fourteen miles distant from Dhu Heartach across open sea, the little island provided a granite quarry and a shore station once the work on the lighthouse was completed. Initial construction on the rock, which began on 25 June 1867 under the supervision of Alan Brebner, required a barrack for the workmen made of iron. Summer gales brought high seas, which resulted in breaking water falling on the roof 77 feet (23 m) above sea level. It held firm, although fourteen men including Brebner were trapped there for five days, and at one point seawater poured in through the trapdoor, swirled around them and exited with their remaining food supplies. Describing a similar occasion, R. L. Stevenson wrote:

The men sat high up prisoned in their iron drum, that then resounded with the lashings of the sprays ... It was then that the foreman builder, Mr. Goodwillie, whom I see before me in his rock-habit of indecipherable rags, would get his fiddle down and strike up human minstrelsy amid the music of the storms.

Despite these hardships a 36-foot-diameter (11-metre) foundation pit was excavated and by 1869 a solid portion of tower rising 32 feet (9.8 m) above foundation level had been completed. This was no mean feat. On one occasion eleven two-ton stones were dislodged from the third course of stonework and carried off the rock, never to be seen again. Robert Stevenson noted that this destruction occurred at the same height "above the sea as the glass panes in the lantern of Smeaton's lighthouse" at Eddystone.

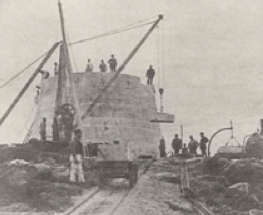
Construction of the tower on site in 1870

The solid base weighing 1,840 tons rises more than 64 feet (20 m) above the pounding seas, more than twice as high as its nearest British rival of Skerryvore. The blocks, having been shaped and fitted on Erraid, were towed out to the rock in barges by the steamer ‘Dhuheartach’ each barge carrying 16 tons. Masonry work was completed in 1871 and the lantern, optical apparatus and fog bell installed the following year, Dubh Artach becoming the first isolated rock light in Britain to use paraffin. The finished tower rises 101 feet (31 m) above the foundation in seventy-seven courses of stonework all told.

The total cost of the works undertaken by the Northern Lighthouse Board was £65,784, excluding the £10,300 cost of establishing the shore station on Erraid. However, the extraordinary nature of the work should not be reduced to mere numbers. Stevenson was moved to note that:

It would be ungenerous if a great and dangerous work like this were brought unsuccessfully to an end and no praise should be given to such men as Mr Brebner the resident Superintendent, Mr MacGregor the captain of the steamer, Mr Goodwillie the master-builder on the rock and Mr Irvine the landing master. If full justice were to be done, the list should be much longer, but I can only add that out of all the workmen who took their lives in their hand to finish the Dhu Heartach Lighthouse, there were very few who turned poltroon. And this is the common history of all such undertakings.

== Early operations ==
Dubh Artach Lighthouse
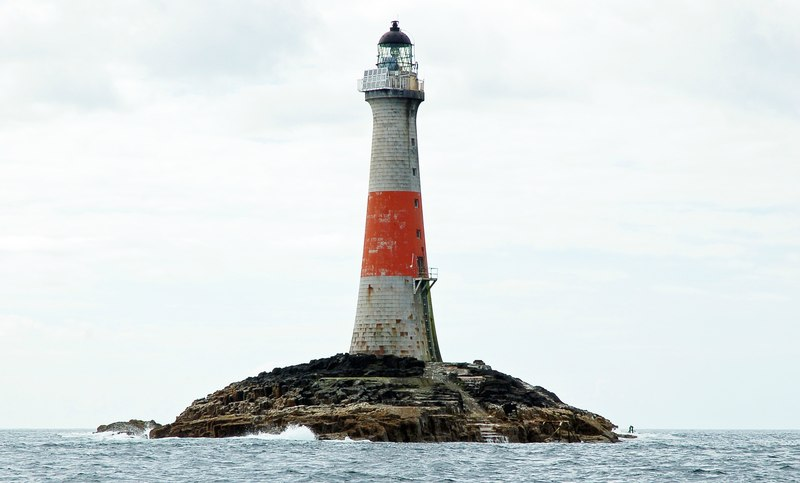
- Location: Dhu Heartach skerry 18 miles (29 km) west of Colonsay, Argyll, Scotland
- OS grid: NM1215702955
- Coordinates: 56°07′59″N 6°37′58″W

Tower
- Constructed: 1872
- Built by: Thomas Stevenson
- Construction: stone, granite (tower)
- Automated: 1971
- Height: 38 m (125 ft)
- Shape: tapered cylindrical tower with balcony and lantern incorporating keeper's quarter
- Markings: Red and white (tower), black (lantern)
- Power source: solar power
- Operator: Northern Lighthouse Board
- Heritage: category A listed building

Light
- Focal height: 44 m (144 ft)
- Range: 20 nmi (37 km; 23 mi)
- Characteristic: Fl(2) W 30s

Completion of the construction work did not result in an end to the hazards. At low tide the landing stage is forty feet above a boat, yet not completely out of the reach of the swell. Landings other than via the precarious use of dangling ropes from a derrick were most unusual even on calm days. The storm seas could rise to extraordinary heights. In the first year of operation, the copper lightning conductor was wrenched out of its sockets by a storm at a height of 92 feet (28 m) above high water.

The first principal keeper was James Ewing who looked after the light for the next eleven years. Despite the exceptionally adverse conditions faced by the keepers, which resulted in them receiving additional payments in kind, Ewing was not the only one who served the light for a decade or more. However, some found the lonely rock and its cramped quarters less to their taste. One had to be prevented from diving into the sea and attempting to swim ashore.

== Later events ==
- In 1874 the principal keeper reported an incident which suggested that the rock had experienced an earth tremor but the tower stood fast.
- Robert Louis Stevenson's connection with the construction of Dubh Artach and its shore station played a significant part in his 1886 novel Kidnapped during which the main character, David Balfour, experiences the dangers of the Torran Rocks and is marooned on Erraid.
- In 1890 a distinctive red band was painted round the middle section of the tower to distinguish it from Skerryvore, 20 miles (32 km) to the northwest, which was served from the same shore station.
- A dispute concerning the financing of lighthouses led to an 1898 visit to Dubh Artach of some prominent persons, including the President of the Board of Trade and the Chancellor of the Exchequer, Sir Michael Hicks Beach.
- The name of the lighthouse was changed in 1964 from Dhuheartach to the present form Dubh Artach. The reasons for this are not clear, although the latter is arguably easier to spell for anglophones.
- The lighthouse was fully automated in 1971 and the following year a helipad was constructed to enable maintenance work to be undertaken without the need for sea landings. The Northern Lighthouse Board, which has had its headquarters at 84 George Street in Edinburgh since 1832, remotely monitors the light.
