= Scotch (adjective) =

Adjective meaning "of or from Scotland"

Scotch is an adjective in English, meaning "of or from Scotland". Many Scots dislike the term Scotch and some consider it offensive. The modern usage in Scotland is Scottish or Scots, and the word Scotch is now only applied only in specific instances, mostly to food or drink, such as Scotch whisky, Scotch pie, and Scotch broth.

The verb to scotch is unrelated to the adjective. Middle English scocchen derives from Anglo-French escocher meaning "to notch, nick or pierce", from coche, "a notch, groove".

== Usage ==
The adjective or noun Scotch is an early modern English (16th century) contraction of the English word Scottish which was later adopted into the Scots language It more or less replaced Scottish as the prevailing term in England in the 17th century. The English playwright William Shakespeare used the word Scotch to describe a jig, but always employed the term Scottish when people were the subject. Scots (the modern Scots language form of early Scots Scottis) predominated in Scotland until the 18th century when anglicisation became fashionable and Scotch came to be used in both England and Scotland. A 1788 letter by Robert Burns says in part: "Apropos, is not the Scotch phrase Auld lang syne exceedingly expressive? There is an old song and tune which has often thrilled through my soul. You know I am an enthusiast in old Scotch songs." ("Auld Lang Syne" in The Burns Encyclopedia, at robertburns.org). Burns wrote of himself in 1787, "The appellation of a Scotch Bard, is by far my highest pride; to continue to deserve it is my most exalted ambition."

In a reminiscence on his early training as an advocate in Edinburgh, Scott describes the law as "Scotch Law" some four times and as "Scots Law" just once. By the 1840s, however, other writers were using Scots law, and this usage is now standard, although not universal, worldwide. Scots law reports in the nineteenth century also show frequent judicial usage of Scotch as referring to people; in contrast, by the end of that century, and since, practically no examples (other than by English judges) can be discovered. These examples offer evidence of how, from the early 19th century, Scots or Scottish increasingly became the preferred usages among educated Scottish people, Scotch being regarded as an anglicised affectation. Even so, the Scottish author Robert Louis Stevenson, in his 1887 collection of essays Memories and Portraits, used Scotch as both an adjective and noun throughout. Still, by 1908, Scots was described by The New York Times as a "long-established… preference" (see article). In modern usage in Scotland, Scotch is little used, other than as described in the following paragraph for certain articles; it has gathered patronising and faintly offensive connotations, in particular of frugality with money.

In modern current usage in England, the general term for things from or pertaining to Scotland is Scottish. Scots is used for the Scots language and Scots law, although one increasingly hears it used of people and organisations, especially in newspaper articles. Scotch remains in use in specific cases, including in the Scots language: Scotch and English (a game), Scotch fiddle (itchiness), Scotch mile and Scotch ell (measures), and many other examples; see the Scots Dialect Dictionary (1911), compiled by Alexander Warrack, M.A., and republished by Waverley Books (2000). Otherwise, there are good indicators that the use of Scotch has become a shibboleth. Early versions of dictionaries produced in Burns's wake in the 19th century had titles such as A Dictionary of the Scotch Dialect of the Lowlands and modern place-names now written as "Scots," such as Scotstarvit and Scotscalder. Scotch Corner survives as a place-name in England. Scotch Terrier has increasingly been replaced with Scottish Terrier. Only in Ulster, especially in County Donegal (chiefly in East Donegal and Inishowen) and County Tyrone (especially in rural West Tyrone), is the term Scotch still widely used.

Scotland was one of the first countries in the world to introduce compulsory education for all children in 1696, administered in each parish by the Kirk. When the British government eventually chose to centralise and regulate the system in 1872, the Scottish school system was initially placed under a "Scotch Education Department" with offices in London. In 1918, as a result of objections from within Scotland, the department was moved to Edinburgh and renamed the Scottish Education Department. This reflects the linguistic preferences of modern Scotland.

In 1965, the historian A.J.P. Taylor wrote in his Preface to English History 1914–1945: "Some inhabitants of Scotland now call themselves Scots and their affairs Scottish. They are entitled to do so. The English word for both is Scotch, just as we call les français the French and Deutschland Germany. Being English, I use it." Likewise, the first edition of John Kenneth Galbraith's The Scotch, illustrated by Samuel H. Bryant, was published in the UK under two alternative titles: as Made to Last and The Non-potable Scotch: A Memoir of the Clansmen in Canada. Galbraith's account of his boyhood environment in Elgin County in southern Ontario was added in 1963. He considered it his finest piece of writing.

In the 1937 film Storm in a Teacup, the Scottish/Scotch debate is a running joke. In one scene, Vicky (Vivien Leigh) is mixing cocktails. She explains to Frank (Rex Harrison) that her father, Provost Gow (Cecil Parker), who is standing for Parliament as a member of the "Caledonia League", "wants to be prime minister of the first Scotch parliament." "Scottish, Vicky, Scottish!" her father pompously corrects her. "Well then, fix yourself a Scottish and soda!" she replies, and flounces out of the door. In another scene, one of Gow's Caledonia League minions says to him "I've never seen the like in thirty years of Scotch politics!", with the same stern rebuke from the provost.

In the chorus of his song "I Love a Lassie (My Scotch Bluebell)", the Scottish music hall comedian and singer Sir Harry Lauder sings "I love a lassie, a bonny hielan lassie... Mary ma Scotch bluebell." By 1978, the song "Scotch Machine," by the pan-European group Voyage, was released in the UK as "Scots Machine."

== See also ==
- Scotch-Irish American
- Scottish English
- Ulster-Scots Agency
