= Olalla =

Olalla may refer to:

== Places ==
- Olalla, British Columbia, an unincorporated settlement in the Similkameen Country of the Southern Interior of British Columbia, Canada
- Olalla, Washington, an unincorporated settlement on the Kitsap Peninsula in Washington, United States
- Olalla, Teruel, locality in Aragon, Spain
- Santa Olalla, village in the province of Toledo

== People ==
=== Given name ===
- Santa Olalla, Galician name for Saint Eulalia of Mérida

=== Surname ===
- Jesús Olalla (born 1971), Spanish handball player
- Julio Olalla (born 1945), former Chilean government lawyer
- Milagros Germán Olalla (born 1958), Dominican TV presenter and producer, theatre actress, and the winner of the Miss Dominican Republic 1980 beauty pageant.
- Stella Maris Olalla (born 1943), Argentine politician

== Other ==
- Olalla (short story), an 1885 vampire story by Robert Louis Stevenson
