= Knocknafenaig =

Coordinates: 56°17′52″N 6°15′18″W

Knocknafenaig: Scottish Gaelic: Cnoc na Fennaig
- The ruins of Knocknafenaig

- Location within Argyll and Bute
- Civil parish: Kilfinichen and Kilvickeon
- Council area: Argyll and Bute
- Country: Scotland
- Sovereign state: United Kingdom
- Police: Scotland
- Fire: Scottish
- Ambulance: Scottish

Knocknafenaig (Scottish Gaelic: Cnoc na Fennaig) is a ruined township on the Isle of Mull, Scotland.

Located in the south-western portion of the island known as the Ross of Mull, Knocknafenaig is an extremely well preserved township that shows many characteristics of the 19th-century and early 20th-century living conditions. Although it is believed to have had medieval settlements, almost no evidence remains of these due to their organic nature. Among the many ruins is a well preserved corn-drying kiln and house, known as Braigh. The Braigh is the last remaining thatched building in the Ross of Mull and was inhabited until the mid-1980s.

The name Cnoc na Fennaig translates as "Hill of the Lazybeds" (this being a reference to the type of cultivation used throughout the area).

In 1779 the township had a population of 70. After the Highland Clearances and the Potato Famine in the mid-19th century the township became increasingly deserted. After World War I Knocknafenaig was divided into six crofts for returning servicemen. Eventually the six crofts were combined to become Ardachy Farm.
