= The Merry Men (short story) =

1882 short story by Robert Louis Stevenson

"The Merry Men" is a short story by Robert Louis Stevenson first published in 1882 in Cornhill Magazine 45-6 (June–July 1882). The story was later published in Stevenson's collection The Merry Men and Other Tales and Fables (1887). It is set on the fictional island Eilean Aros, based on the Isle of Erraid. The title derives from the local name given to a group of waves in the story, not from the Merry Men of Robin Hood and his merry men.

== Plot summary ==
The narrator, Charles Darnaway, a recent graduate of the University of Edinburgh, travels to the remote island of Aros off the northwest coast of Scotland. Aros is the home of his uncle, Gordon Darnaway, a hard-hearted and alcoholic Presbyterian. Charles has come in search of sunken treasure, as he believes a ship of the Spanish Armada sank in the bay under his uncle's home long before. Charles hopes to use the treasure to restore the Darnaways' fortunes and marry Gordon's daughter (and Charles' cousin) Mary Ellen.

Charles is rowed out to the promontory by the only other inhabitant, Gordon's servant Rorie. Charles is surprised to find Rorie and Gordon anxious and full of foreboding, though both furtively evade his questions. He is further surprised to find his uncle's austere home decorated with expensive lamps and rugs. He realizes at once they must have come from a shipwreck, and feels uneasy about this looting of the dead. His cousin Mary Ellen confirms that a ship was recently cast away nearby, having been driven by a storm into the dreadful breakers around the promontory, breakers that roar a hundred feet high around the rocks and are called "the Merry Men" due to the vast noise they make, like shrieking laughter.

Charles goes down to the shore on his treasure-hunt. While there he sees the shattered hull of the wrecked ship, and also a fresh grave. He realizes the grave must be for the body of a mariner washed ashore. He takes this as a bad omen, but still sets out to the point where he thinks the Spanish ship must be. His first dive locates a weed-grown structure which appears to be the sunken ship, but a second dive shows it to be only a rock formation. He hauls himself along the weed-grown rocks, looking for signs of the wreck, until the signs of an approaching storm warn him to return to shore. As he makes for the surface his handhold breaks off in his grip; when he pulls himself on shore he looks at it and is horrified to recognize a human leg bone. He lays the bone on the sand, resolving to do no more hunting for the wreck.

On his way back to the house he sees a small boat, full of strangers, rowing around the bay. Watching them he is convinced that they too are searching for the sunken Spanish ship. He returns to tell his uncle that he saw a stranger on the shore, and is surprised by Gordon's panicked dread. Charles realizes that the mariner whose grave he saw came ashore alive, and that his uncle murdered him. Gordon runs out into the storm, with Charles after him, only to see the strangers' ship caught in the Merry Men and destroyed.

Further down the shore they find a man standing in the hull of the earlier wreck, a black man who speaks no language Charles knows. By sign language the stranger signifies that he is one of the strangers' party that was left behind, but Gordon, his guilty conscience overwhelming him, believes him to be the ghost of the man he murdered. Driven mad, Gordon flees into the storm and eventually flings himself into the sea, pursued by the silent stranger; both are swallowed up by the Merry Men.

== Analysis ==
Eilean (Scottish Gaelic for island) Aros, the fictional island setting of the story, is based on the Isle of Erraid in the Inner Hebrides. Stevenson wrote of his time there in his collection of essays Memories and Portraits, where he says "[t]here is another isle in my collection, the memory of which besieges me. I put a whole family there, in one of my tales; and later on, threw upon its shores, and condemned to several days of rain and shellfish on its tumbled boulders, the hero of another."

It is possible that the stranger from the Sea may be the Devil. There was a long tradition in Scotland that the Devil appeared as a black man (Stevenson mentions this in a footnote to Thrawn Janet, another story in the same collection.) Also, Gordon earlier claimed that the Sea was the work of the Devil.

A parallel can be drawn between this story and the later Heart of Darkness by Joseph Conrad, another story of an isolated man driven mad by Nature. Gordon's rant about the Devil living in the Sea ends with him moaning, "The horror! The horror of the sea!" ...which is echoed in Conrad in Kurtz's last message: "The horror! The horror! Exterminate all the brutes!"
