= Camas Tuath =

Coordinates: 56°20′19″N 6°17′16″W

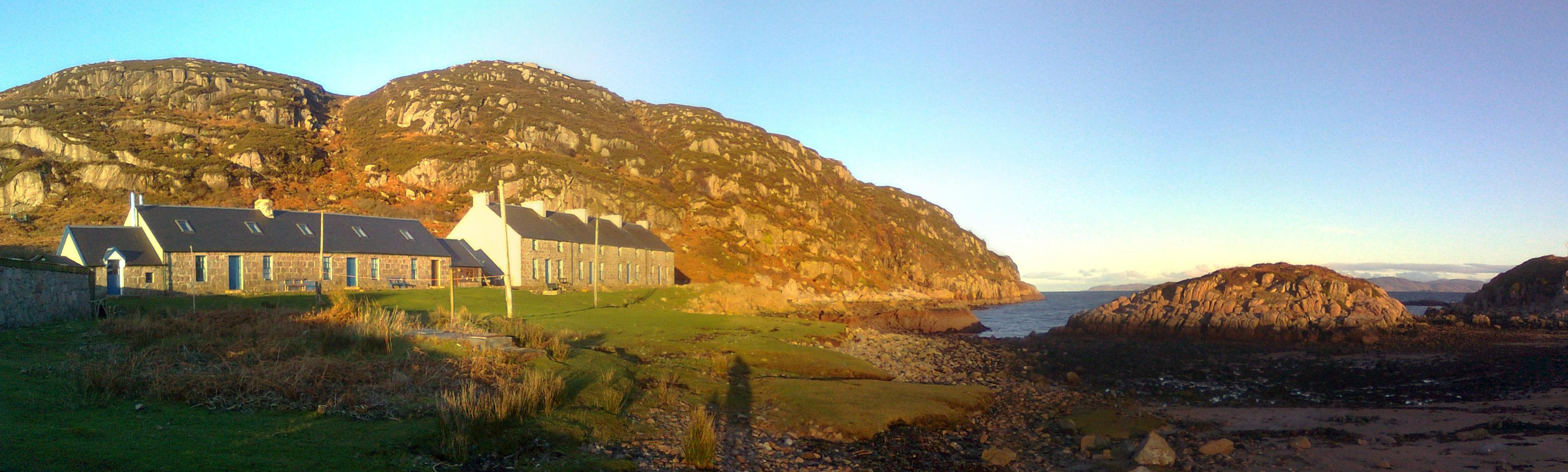
- Cottages at Camas Tuath, Isle of Mull, UK

- Location within Mull
- Location: Ross of Mull
- Type: Inlet bay
- Etymology: Scottish Gaelic: North bay

Camas Tuath (Scottish Gaelic: North bay) is an inlet bay on the Ross of Mull.

The bay has two small tidal islands and two Quarrymans' Cottages which the Iona Community lease as an adventure camp. It is accessible by a 1 1/2-mile (2.5-kilometre) walk down a moorland track and by boat. Activities run at the centre include kayaking, coasteering, abseiling, hill-walking, raft building, fishing, juggling and arts and crafts.

Camas Tuath has an organic garden that, over the years, has been taken care of by different gardeners. The bottom garden has two polytunnels, inside which lettuce, tomatoes and other vegetables are grown. The bottom garden is also home to many different herbs and sometimes fruit. As one moves up the garden, there are seaweed beds that grow carrots and other hardy vegetables. There is also a garden shed and igloo made from willow, and a small shed hidden within the trees. Towards the top of the garden is a round house, with space for a fire in the centre.

The Camas Centre has two buildings that were built over 160 years ago, and that were renovated in 2006, when mains water was added, along with a 6 kW wind turbine and an Aquatron (composting toilet system), which turns human waste into compost using composting worms. During the renovations the centre was closed to the public, and the right of way was closed, as the site was dangerous. Now that Camas Tuath is re-opened it welcomes up to 28 guests a week and offers activity weeks, themed weeks, work weeks, garden weeks, and open weeks.

== See also ==
- Erraid
- Hinba
