= Shiaba =

Coordinates: 56.296543°N 6.142084°W

Shiaba: Scottish Gaelic: Siaba
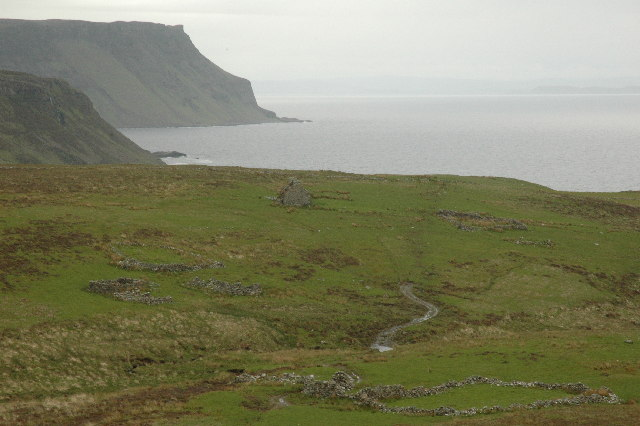
- View looking west over Shiaba towards Carsaig Arches

- Location within Argyll and Bute
- Civil parish: Kilfinichen and Kilvickeon
- Council area: Argyll and Bute
- Country: Scotland
- Sovereign state: United Kingdom
- Police: Scotland
- Fire: Scottish
- Ambulance: Scottish

Shiaba (Scottish Gaelic: Siaba) is a ruined township located on the southwestern peninsula of the Isle of Mull, Scotland. It lies about 8 km to the east of the village of Bunessan, beyond Loch Assapol and Scoor House. It was awarded the status of Scheduled monument in 1993 due to its significance as a source of information about 18th and 19th century rural life in Scotland.

== Etymology ==
The name Shiaba is derived from the Gaelic Sia Ba meaning "six cows", a reflection of the area's relative fertility in comparison to other parts of the Ross of Mull. This reputation appears to have been backed up by the findings of the Napier Commission of 1883.

== History ==
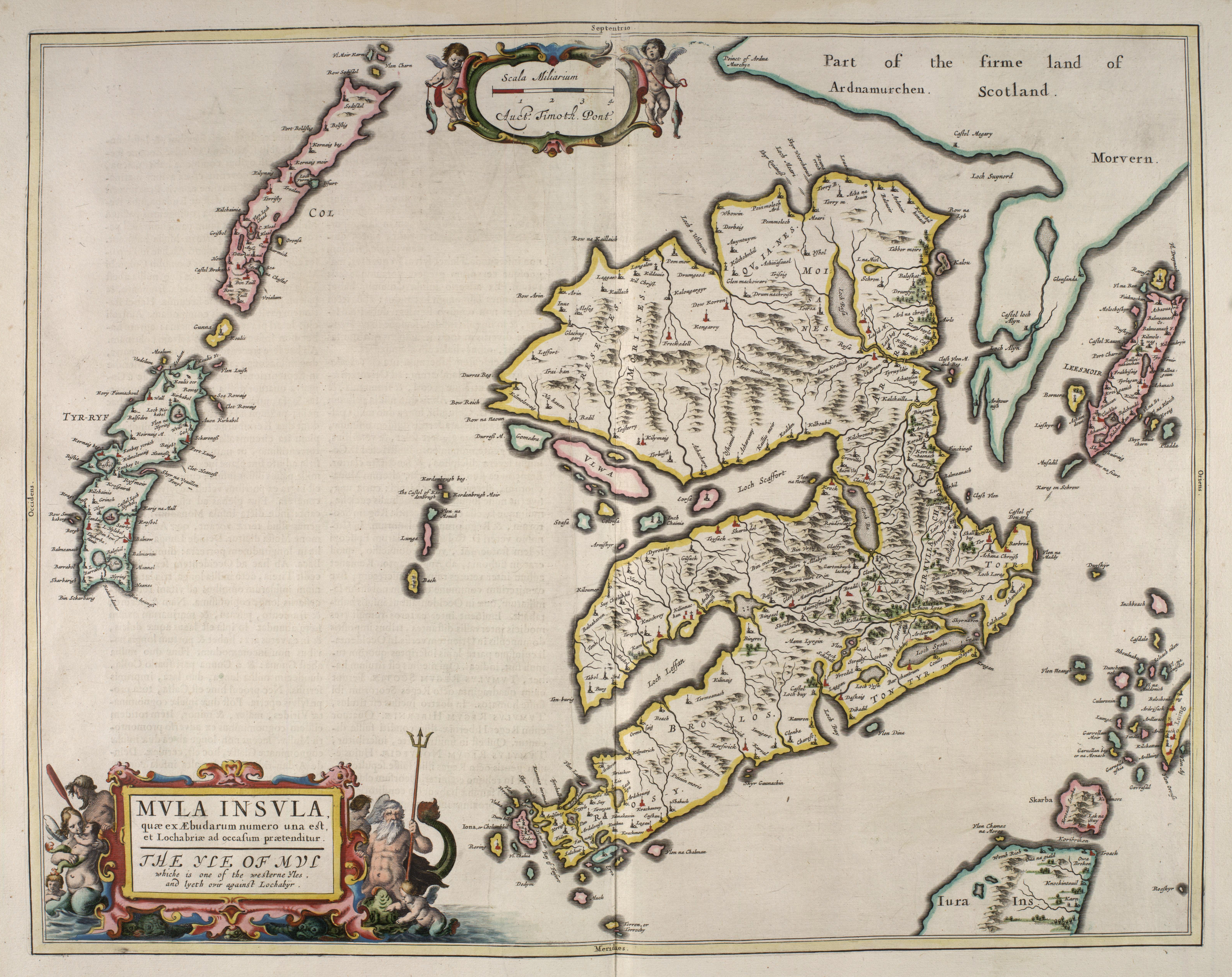
Mull as shown in Bleau's Atlas of Scotland, 1654. Shiaba (as 'Shaback') can be found towards the bottom left on the Ross of Mull (Ros-y)

The township first appears by the name Shiaba in written records in 1779, though it is thought likely that its existence predates this. A possible earlier reference can be found in Bleau's Atlas of Scotland, 1654, which depicts the settlement of 'Shaback' in the approximate location of Shiaba.

While the community initially operated using the run rig agricultural system, around 1804 it had changed into a crofting community with fixed areas of land attached to each croft. It is likely that this change was at least partially driven by a policy of 'Modernisation' carried out by the landowner the Duke of Argyll, as it was believed this system would generate greater incomes for the inhabitants allowing for greater rents to be charged.

At its height the settlement included a School, two corn-drying kilns, one if not two horizontal watermills, around 12 dwellings built in the typical local-fashion with rounded-corners, as well as other agricultural structures including byres, peat-drying stacks, and possibly a small chapel. The remains of most of these buildings are still clearly visible. The population in the mid-1800s was around 130.

The clearance of the settlement began in 1845 when the Duke of Argyll issued the residents with an eviction notice. The literate and articulate response of those inhabitants who wished to remain is well-documented. However, in 1847 almost all the inhabitants were removed, with some relocating to other areas of the Ross of Mull while others were encouraged to go overseas. A contributing factor to the clearance of the village was the hardship experienced by the people of Shiaba following the failure of the potato crop in 1846 which gave support to the landlord's arguments that removal was in their best interests.

According to the 1871 census only a single shepherd and his family remained, tending a flock and managing 92 hectares of land. This dwelling too was vacated in 1937 following severe storm damage and the township was finally abandoned entirely.

A notable resident of Shiba was the Gaelic poet Mary MacLucas, author of the Gaelic hymn Leanabh an àigh (Child in a Manger). The tune of this piece later became famous as the melody to the more widely known hymn Morning Has Broken.

== Designation as a Scheduled Monument ==
The remains of the settlement were given Scheduled Monument designation by Historic Scotland on 5 March 1993. The decision was made on the grounds that it was of national importance as a well-preserved and documented settlement showing the evolution from a pre-crofting to a crofting economy, and which therefore has the potential to provide information about the Scottish rural economy and society in the eighteenth and nineteenth centuries.
