= Skerryvore =

Remote reef off the coast of Scotland

An Sgeir Mhòr (Gaelic)
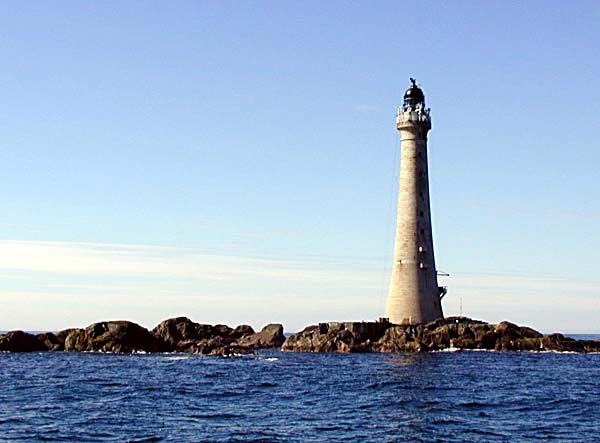

Location
- Location within Argyll and Bute
- OS grid reference: NL841265
- Coordinates: 56.325°N 7.111°W

Name
- Name meaning: The Great Skerry

Physical geography
- Island group: Inner Hebrides
- Area: 26 m^{2} (280 sq ft)
- Highest elevation: 3 m (10 ft)

Administration
- Council area: Argyll and Bute
- Country: Scotland
- Sovereign state: United Kingdom

Demographics
- Population: 0

Skerryvore (from the Gaelic An Sgeir Mhòr meaning "The Great Skerry") is a remote island that lies off the west coast of Scotland, 11 nautical miles (20 kilometres) southwest of Tiree. Skerryvore Lighthouse is located on these rocks, built with some difficulty between 1838 and 1844 by Alan Stevenson.

At a height of 156 feet (48 metres) it is the tallest lighthouse in Scotland. The shore station was at Hynish on Tiree (which now houses the Skerryvore Lighthouse Museum); operations were later transferred to Erraid, west of Mull. The remoteness of the location led to the keepers receiving additional payments in kind. The light shone without a break from 1844 until a fire in 1954 shut down operations for five years. The lighthouse was automated in 1994.

== Geology ==
In pre-historic times the rocks that now form Skerryvore were covered by the ice sheets that spread from Scotland out into the Atlantic Ocean beyond the Outer Hebrides. After the last retreat of the ice around 20,000 years ago, sea levels were up to 400 feet (120 m) lower than at present. Although the isostatic rise of land makes estimating post-glacial coastlines a complex task, circa 14,000 BP it is likely that the reef was at the south western end of a large island consisting of the modern islands of Tiree and Coll and the surrounding land.

Steadily rising sea levels would then have slowly isolated and finally all but submerged the shoals of Skerryvore, a barrier of innumerable metamorphic remnants that stretch for 8 miles (13 kilometres) lying in a south-westerly direction. A detailed survey undertaken in 1834 listed more than 130 main rocks including Am Bonn Sligheach (Boinshley) (Scottish Gaelic: The Deceitful Bottom) and Am Bogha Ruadh (Scottish Gaelic: The Red Submerged Rock).

The rocks have been worn smooth by the action of the waves and are constantly affected by spray. Alan Stevenson wrote: "The effect of the jet d'eau was at times extremely beautiful, the water being so broken as to form a snow-white and opaque pillar, surrounded by a fine vapour in which, during sunshine, beautiful rainbows were observed ".

It is an isolated outpost of the Inner Hebrides archipelago composed of Lewisian gneiss, formed in the Precambrian eon, these rocks being amongst the most ancient rocks in Europe. A further hazard to shipping is a magnetic anomaly in the area.

== Planning and construction of the lighthouse ==
=== Surveys ===
Between 1790 and 1844 more than thirty ships were known to have been wrecked in the area. Robert Stevenson, chief engineer of the Northern Lighthouse Board (NLB) landed on the reef in 1804 and reported on the need for a beacon of some kind there. In 1814 he returned in the company of Sir Walter Scott and a party of NLB Commissioners. Scott wrote:

Quiet perseverance on the part of Mr S, and great kicking, bouncing and squabbling upon that of the yacht, who seems to like the idea of Skerry Vhor as little as the Commissioners. At length, by dint of exertion, come in sight of this long ridge of rocks (chiefly under water), on which the tide breaks in a most tremendous style. There appear a few low broad rocks at one end of the reef, which is about a mile in length. These are never entirely under water though the surf dashes over them.... It will be a most desolate position for a lighthouse, the Bell Rock and Eddystone a joke to it, for the nearest land is the wild island of Tyree, at 14 miles distance. So much for Skerry Vhor.

Later that year an Act of Parliament was passed enabling construction of a lighthouse, yet despite pleas for a light arriving almost weekly at the NLB, events proceeded only slowly. It was not until 1834 that Robert Stevenson returned in the company of his son Alan. A painstaking survey made it clear that there was little choice for a location. The single largest area was a rock that measured only 280 sq ft (26 m^{2}) at low tide. Readings for wave pressure indicated that any tower would have to withstand forces of 6,000 pounds per square foot (300 kilopascals). There were suggestions that a tower of cast iron or bronze might be sufficient, but Stevenson senior wrote that "no pecuniary consideration could in my opinion have justified the adoption of an iron lighthouse for Skerryvore." On more than one occasion the surveyors had to warn passing vessels of the danger. A ship from Newcastle, whose charts showed only the main rock some miles away, was boarded near Bo Ruadh. The Master, oblivious to the dangers, was found lying at ease smoking a pipe with his wife beside him knitting stockings.

Still the Commissioners prevaricated, daunted by the potential costs, estimated by Robert Stevenson at £63,000. They set up a special Skerryvore Committee, whose members decided to visit the site by steamer to see for themselves. Just off Skerryvore a fire broke out in the boiler room crippling the ship. It was extinguished and no harm was done, but the experience may have been persuasive.

Alan Stevenson was duly appointed as the engineer for the project aged only 30. He designed a tower 156 feet (48 m) high with a base of 42 feet (13 m), narrowing to just 16 feet (4.9 m) at the lantern gallery. The lowest sections would be solid, although at 26 feet (8 m) feet high they were less than half the height of the base of the later light at nearby Dubh Artach. Nonetheless, the structure would weigh 4,308 long tons (4,377 tonnes) and the volume of the base would be more than 4 times larger than the entire structure of the Eddystone light and twice that of the Bell Rock. With 151 steps to the top it would be the tallest and heaviest lighthouse yet built anywhere in the modern world, and today it is still one of the tallest lighthouse in the United Kingdom.

=== Shore station ===
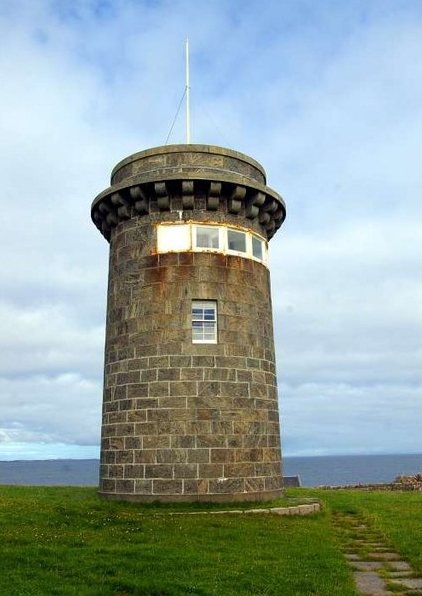
Hynish signal tower, now a museum

Hynish on Tiree was the initial shore station and construction site. Located on the south west corner of Tiree, its proximity to Skerryvore and the resulting abundance of bounty from the wrecks, led to rentals being higher here and on the rest of the west coast than elsewhere on the island. Work on the new facilities began in 1837; granite blocks were quarried from Mull and brought to the village to be cut and shaped before being shipped out to the reef. Several cottages for the keepers were built in 1844 from the same stone as well as a massive pier and a tall granite tower to enable signalling to and from Skerryvore itself. Stevenson remarked that the hive of activity there contrasted with the "desolation and misery" he imagined to be the lot of the surrounding population.

=== Barrack and foundation ===
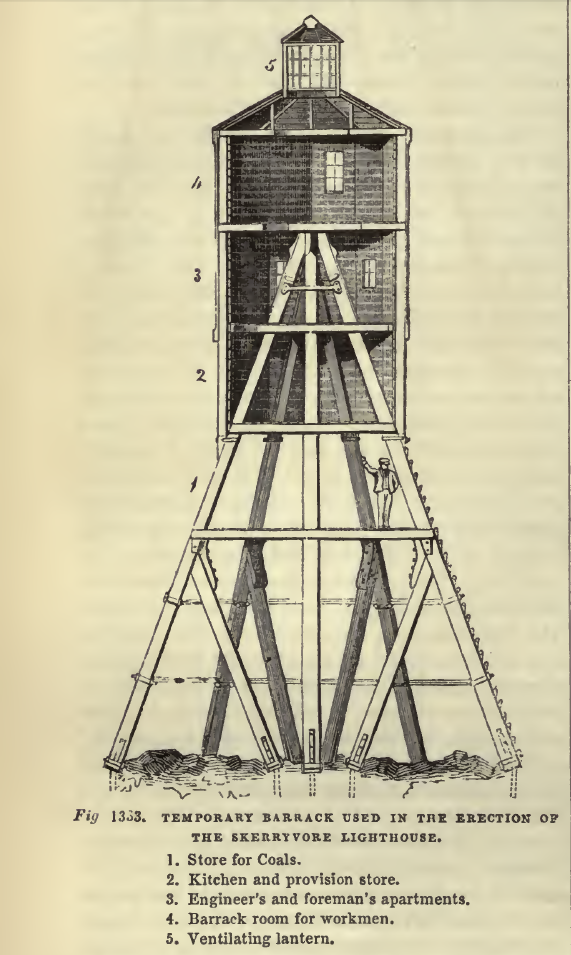
Temporary barrack used in the erection of the Skerryvore lighthouse

In 1838 £15,000 in wages alone was spent on constructing a 150-ton steamer in Leith to ferry workers and materials out to the reef. The difficulties should not be underestimated. Although Skerryvore is a dozen miles (19 km) from Hynish it is 50 miles (80 km) from the mainland. The first work to be undertaken on Skerryvore itself was the construction of a six-legged frame on top of which a wooden barrack to house 40 men was placed. The building was created in Gourock before being dismantled and re-built on site.

Initial work began on the rock on 7 August 1838. Stevenson and 21 workmen arrived on board the sailing vessel Pharos and began to unload the barrack, whose massive legs were set into holes blasted out of the rock. After only two days the site had to be abandoned as a storm swept in from the Atlantic. It was a further six days before they could resume the punishing schedule of 16 hours a day work between 4 am and 8 pm. Fearing sea sickness, many of the men preferred to attempt to sleep on the damp rocks than on the ever-rolling Pharos.

Work for the season lasted only until 11 September, by which time the barrack legs had been secured although not the main structure. Less than two months later Stevenson received a letter from the storekeeper at Hynish, Mr. Hogben. It began: "Dear Sir, I am extremely sorry to inform you that the barrack erected on Skerryvore Rock has totally disappeared." The structure had been destroyed during a gale on 3 November and four months effort had been wasted. Stevenson hired a boat to take him out to inspect the damage the same day he received this news. Firm in his self-belief, he resolved to build a stronger but otherwise identical replacement. Work began in April 1839 and by early September the completed barrack stood 60 feet (18 m) above the rock. Entry was via ladders attached to the legs that led into the lowest level containing a kitchen. The middle level contained two cabins, one for Stevenson, the other for his master of works, whilst the top level provided sleeping quarters for a further 30 to 40 men.

Work on the foundations for the lighthouse continued until 30 September. A total of 296 charges were used to remove 2,000 long tons (2,000 tonnes) of rock and Stevenson believed that the rock was so hard that the effort involved was four times that required for boring Aberdeenshire granite. The work went well but by the end of the second season, no blocks had yet been laid. However, between April 1839 and June 1840 4,300 blocks had been fashioned, the stone donated by the Duke of Argyll from quarries on Mull. The roughly hewn rock was taken to Hynish where the blocks were hammered and chiselled into shape. The largest weighed over 2 1/2 long tons (2.5 t), the smallest 3/4 long ton (0.8 t) and the precision required meant that a single block could take 320 worker-hours to complete.

=== Tower ===
Skerryvore Lighthouse Sgeir Mhòr
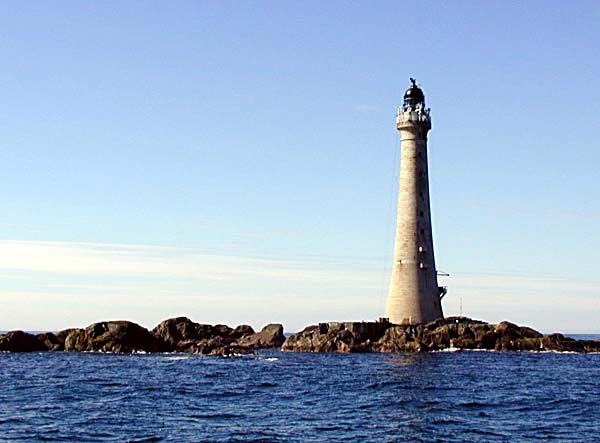
- Location: Skerryvore, Argyll and Bute, Tiree, United Kingdom
- OS grid: NL8400426289
- Coordinates: 56°19′23″N 7°06′58″W

Tower
- Constructed: 1844
- Built by: Alan Stevenson
- Construction: granite (tower)
- Automated: 1994
- Height: 48 m (157 ft)
- Shape: tapered cylindrical tower with balcony and lantern incorporating keeper’s quarters
- Markings: Unpainted (tower), black (lantern)
- Power source: solar power
- Operator: Northern Lighthouse Board
- Heritage: category A listed building
- Fog signal: one blast every 60 s

Light
- Deactivated: 1954–1959
- Focal height: 46 m (151 ft)
- Range: 23 nmi (43 km; 26 mi)
- Characteristic: Fl W 10s

The new barrack withstood the violence of the storms during the winter of 1839–1840. Work re-commenced on the rock on 30 April 1840, and after the arrival of the new steamer Skerryvore the carefully fashioned blocks began to arrive on site. The first one was laid by John Campbell, 7th Duke of Argyll on 4 July. His son George later wrote:

That sight is as fresh in my memory after an interval of 57 years as if I had seen it yesterday. The natural surfaces of the rock were irregular in the highest degree. Worn, broken, and battered by the unnumbered ages of the most tremendous surf, and by the splitting of the rock along lines of natural fissures, there did not seem to be one square foot of rock which was even tolerably level. Yet in the midst of this torn and fissured surface we suddenly came on a magnificent circular floor, 42 ft [12.8 m] in diameter, as level as water, and as smooth as a billiard table.

Soon up to 95 blocks a day were arriving from Hynish, although the weather continued to play its part. During the summer of 1840 the steamer was unable to reach the reef for fourteen consecutive days, and on another occasion no landings were possible for seven weeks and supplies began to run low. When work ceased again in the autumn, 800 tons of granite standing 8 feet 2 inches (2.49 m) high stood on Skerryvore, and up to 80 craftsmen continued to labour on the blocks at Hynish all winter. The first three courses of the base are of hard Hynish gneiss, the remainder are granite from the Ross of Mull.

Work continued during 1841–42, a crane being used to hoist the huge blocks as the tower rose. The last one was raised to the parapet in July 1842. Robert Stevenson, then aged 70, visited the site on his last annual voyage of inspection. The walls at the base are 9.5 feet (2.9 m) thick, and 2 feet (0.61 m) thick at the top. The lightroom and lantern sit above nine apartments 12 feet (3.7 m) in diameter. The total cost of the works undertaken by the Northern Lighthouse Board was £86,977, including the cost of establishing the shore station at Hynish, estimated at £13,000. It is a credit to Stevenson, his foreman Charles Stewart, and Captain Macurich the landing master, that not a single life was lost during the construction.

=== Fitting out ===
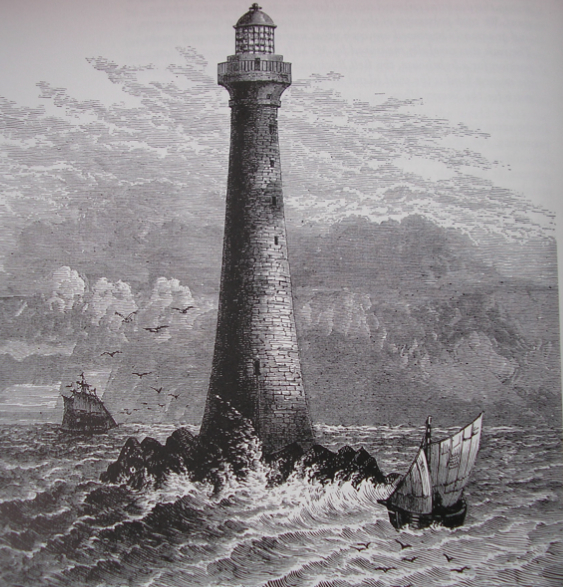
19th-century engraving of the lighthouse

The final season of work in 1843 was spent in fitting out the interior. By then Alan had become chief engineer to the NLB and the final work was undertaken under the supervision of his brother Thomas. The light, which had eight lenses revolving around a four wick lamp with pyramidal lenses above and reflecting prisms below each one, was constructed by John Milne of Edinburgh. The machinery was ready by the beginning of 1844, but it was seven weeks before a landing could be undertaken on the rock. The lamp was finally lit on 1 February and it shone without interruption for the next 110 years.

Skerryvore was Alan Stevenson's greatest achievements from both an engineering and aesthetic perspective. No philistine, he chose a hyberbolic curve for the outline for stylistic reasons. His nephew Robert Louis described it as "the noblest of all extant deep-sea lights" and according to the Northern Lighthouse Board it is "asserted by some that Skerryvore is the world's most graceful lighthouse".

== Keepers ==
Such are the hazards of the surrounding reefs that the lighthouse is not normally approached by shipping. However, completion of the construction work did not result in an end to the difficulties for those involved in its operations. The easiest landing is at Riston's Gully, which intersects the rock near the tower. An unaided landing has been described as "like climbing up the side of a bottle". A system of ropes attached to a derrick was installed to assist these dangerous operations. Statistics compiled for the two decades from 1881 to 1890 showed Skerryvore as having been the stormiest part of Scotland. There were a total of 542 storms lasting 14,211 hours during that period. One keeper lost his hearing for several weeks, after a lightning strike had thrown him through the entrance door.

James Tomison, who became a keeper in 1861, wrote of the bird migrations visible from the tower: "Hundreds of birds are flying about in all directions, crossing and re-crossing one another's flight, but never coming into collision, all seemingly of the opinion that the only way of escape out of the confusion into which they have got is through the windows of the lantern". A fog bell had been installed by then, one of only two operating in Scotland at the time.

The adverse conditions faced by the keepers resulted in them receiving additional payments in kind, but the remote location suited some veterans. Archibald McEachern was assistant keeper for 14 years from 1870 to 1884 and John Nicol was principal from 1890 to 1903. The latter was involved in a dramatic rescue when the liner Labrador en route from Halifax, Nova Scotia to Liverpool ran aground on the nearby Mackenzie's Rock in 1899. The lifeboats were manned and two made it to Mull, but one with eighteen passengers reached the lighthouse where they were looked after for two and a half days before they could be taken to the mainland. There were no deaths and Nicol and his two assistants were commended by the NLB for their efforts.

John Muir, who served as a keeper with the NLB for 39 years all told, had a posting to Skerryvore from 1902 to 1914. He helped complete a new "landing grating", as the slender metal walkway was called, that made landings possible in conditions previously considered "hopeless". He baked his own bread and scones and made an inlaid table and Iona marble inkstand.

== Post-construction events ==
Numerous dignitaries visited the light in the ensuing years. William Chambers, the Lord Provost of Edinburgh came in 1866 and wrote:

I was interested in knowing the method of intercourse by signals. Every morning between nine and ten o'clock, a ball is hoisted at the lighthouse to signify that all is well at the Skerryvore. Should this signal fail to be given a ball is raised at Hynish to enquire if anything is wrong. Should no reply be made by the hoisting of the ball, the schooner, hurried from its wet dock, is put to sea and steers for the lighthouse.... I enquired how high the waves washed up the side of the tower during the most severe storms, and was told that they sometimes rose as high as the first window, or about 60 ft above the level of the rocks; yet, that even in these frightful tumults of wind and waves the building never shook, and no apprehension of danger was entertained.

The visual similarity between Skerryvore and Dubh Artach 20 miles (32 kilometres) to the south east, led to the NLB painting a distinctive red band round the middle section of the latter in 1890. The Hynish Shore Station had the advantage of proximity to the site during the construction period. However, the small harbour offered little shelter for shipping. The keepers operated from here until 1892 when operations were transferred to Erraid adjacent to the Isle of Mull. Other than the signal tower, the land and buildings on Tiree were sold to George Campbell, 8th Duke of Argyll who had witnessed the laying of the first stone on Skerryvore fifty-two years previously. A paddle steamer, Signal, built by Laird of Greenock in 1883 was based at Erraid for relief operations. The shore station was moved to Oban in the 1950s.

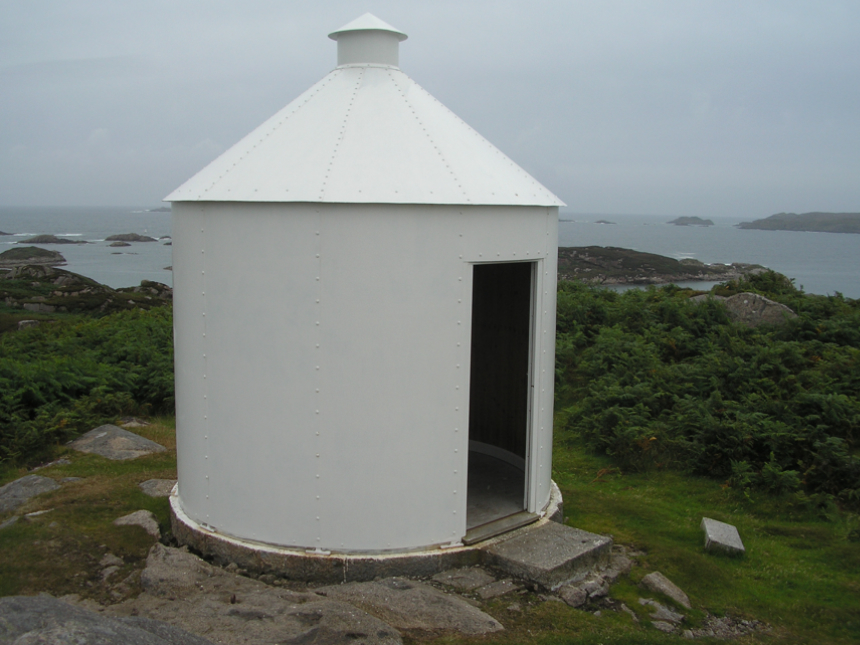
Erraid observatory looking towards Skerryvore

In 1916 mines were laid in the vicinity of the rock by the German submarines SM U-71 and SM U-78. In July 1940 during World War II a stick of bombs was dropped by a passing German plane. The explosion cracked two lantern panes and shattered one of the incandescent mantles.

A disastrous fire started on the seventh floor on the night of 16 March 1954 and spread downwards. The keepers had no time to raise the alarm and were driven out of the lighthouse onto the rocks but rescued the next day when the relief vessel arrived as part of its regular schedule. The heat of the fire caused damage to both the interior and the structure and a lightship and series of temporary lights were installed during reconstruction. Three new generators were placed in the lighthouse to provide an electric light source, the lantern being re-lit on 6 August 1959.

A helipad was constructed in 1972 to enable relief trips to be undertaken without the need for perilous sea landings. The lighthouse has been fully automated since 31 March 1994 and is monitored via a radio link to Ardnamurchan lighthouse. The Northern Lighthouse Board, which has had its headquarters at 84 George Street in Edinburgh since 1832, remotely monitors the light.

The Hynish tower has been converted to house the Skerryvore Lighthouse Museum, run by the Hebridean Trust who have also restored the pier. It is now possible to visit Skerryvore with Tiree-based Tiree Sea Tours.

== See also ==
- List of lighthouses in Scotland
- List of Northern Lighthouse Board lighthouses
- Dubh Artach
- Erraid
