= The Merry Men and Other Tales and Fables =

1887 collection by Robert Louis Stevenson

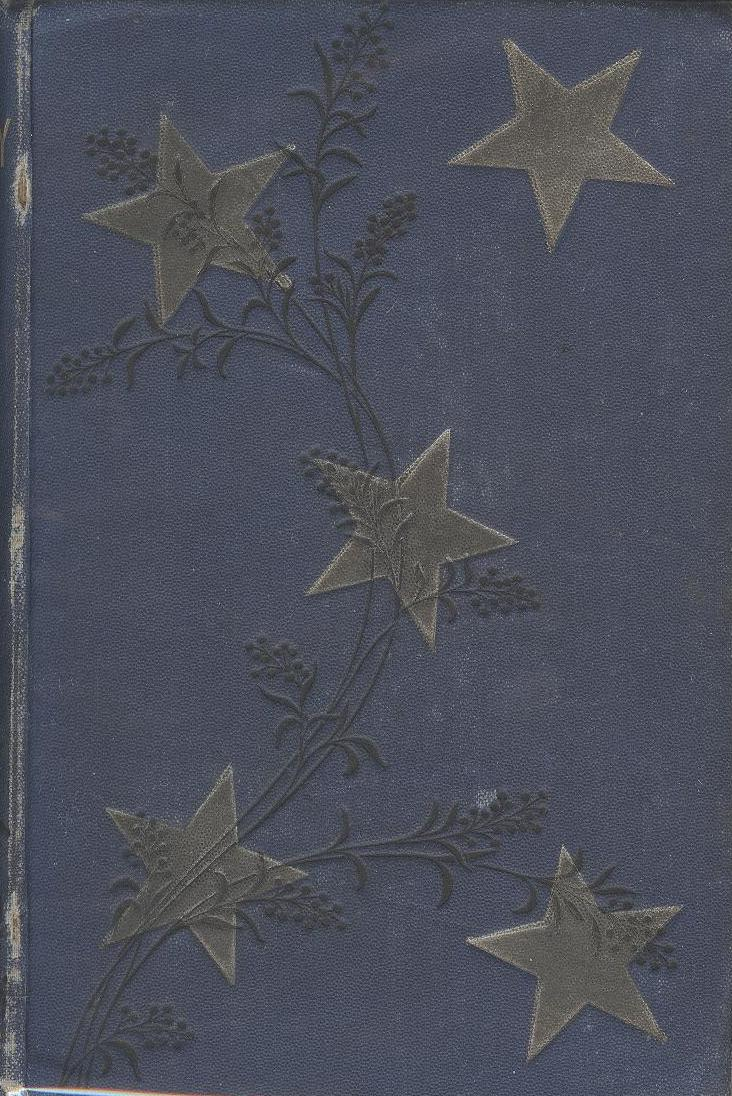
- 1st U.K. edition 1887
- Author: Robert Louis Stevenson
- Language: English and Scots
- Genre: Short stories
- Publisher: Chatto and Windus
- Publication date: 1887
- Publication place: Scotland
- Media type: Print (Hardback)
- Text: The Merry Men and Other Tales and Fables at Wikisource

The Merry Men and Other Tales and Fables is an 1887 collection of short stories by Robert Louis Stevenson. The title derives from the local name given to a group of waves in the title short story, not from the Merry Men of Robin Hood tales.

== Contents ==
- The Merry Men
- Will o' the Mill
- Markheim
- Thrawn Janet
- Olalla
- The Treasure of Franchard
