= Suidhe =

Coordinates: 56.316761°N 6.253278°W

- Location within Argyll and Bute
- Civil parish: Kilfinichen and Kilvickeon
- Council area: Argyll and Bute
- Country: Scotland
- Sovereign state: United Kingdom
- Police: Scotland
- Fire: Scottish
- Ambulance: Scottish

Suidhe (Scottish Gaelic: Suidhe) is a ruined township located on the southwestern peninsula of the Isle of Mull, in the council area of Argyll and Bute, Scotland. It lies about three-quarters mile (1.2 km) to the west of the village of Bunessan in the civil parish of Kilfinichen and Kilvickeon. It was awarded the status of Scheduled monument in 2004 on the basis of its potential value as a source of information about post-medieval, and possibly medieval, settlement and economy in the Western Isles of Scotland.

== Etymology ==
The name Suidhe is derived from the Gaelic for seat. One theory suggests that this name may be a reference to the location as a resting place at the top of the steep hill out of the village of Bunessan.

== History ==
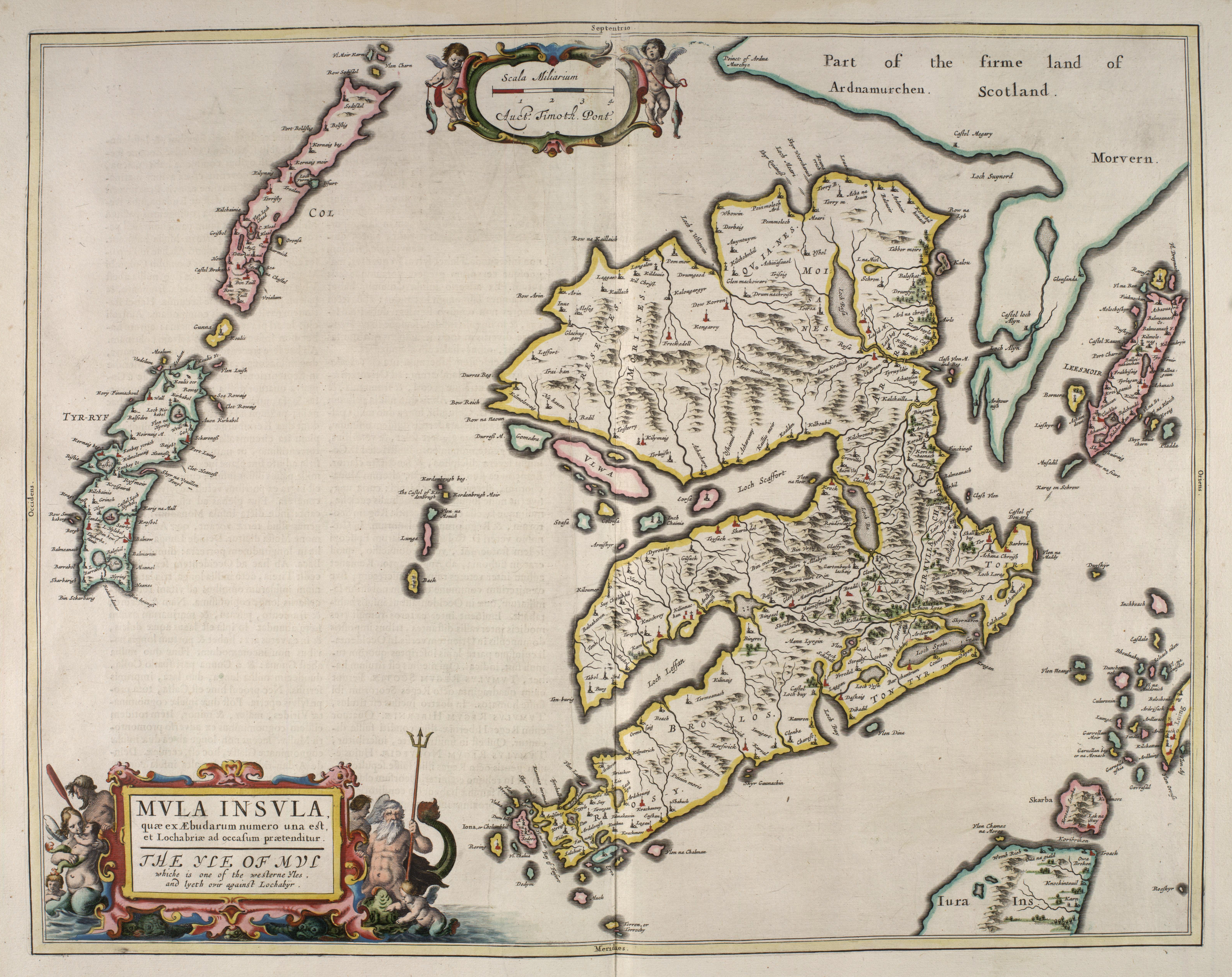
Mull as shown in Bleau's Atlas of Scotland, 1654. Suidhe (as 'Suy') can be found towards the bottom left on the Ross of Mull (Ros-y)

The first documented reference to the settlement is found in Bleau's Atlas of Scotland, 1654, which depicts the site of 'Suy'. In the Ordnance Survey First Edition map one unroofed and five roofed buildings are shown, along with a head dyke and an enclosure.

The 1779 census of inhabitants of the Argyll estates shows a population of 11, excluding female children. It is likely that one of the John McCormicks (anglicised form of McCarmaig) recorded in the census was the source of information for a 1791 work entitled A Description of the curious monuments and antiquities in the island of Icolmkill, or the island of St. Colman-Kill. Also an account of the island of Staffa, [...] By a gentleman who made the tour of Europe, prior to this description, in a letter to a friend. Only one extant copy of this pamphlet is known to exist, held in the collection of the British Library .

Architectural remains at the site reflect changing construction techniques. Earlier structures have rounded gables and are of drystone construction, typical of buildings roofed with thatch. Later ones have the squared gables which became common when corrugated iron became the preferred roofing material.

The site is known to have been fully abandoned by the 1940s.

== Designation as a Scheduled Monument ==
The remains of the settlement were given Scheduled Monument designation by Historic Scotland on 20 January 2004. The decision was made on the grounds that it was of national importance as a source of information about post-medieval, and possibly medieval, settlement and economy. The scheduling decision also note that the site's importance is increased by the cartographic and archeological evidence that it was occupied and adapted over a period of at least several hundred years.

== Bronze age barrow and standing stones ==
Slightly to the south of the township ruins is another scheduled monument consisting of a prehistoric barrow and several standing stones. The barrow is typical of the type believed to be used as funerary monuments dating to the Neolithic and Early Bronze Age (3000 -2000 BC). The scheduling decision, made in 1963, was based upon the fact that the burial mound may be expected to contain information relating to the techniques used in its construction and use.
