= Olalla (short story) =

1885 short story by Robert Louis Stevenson

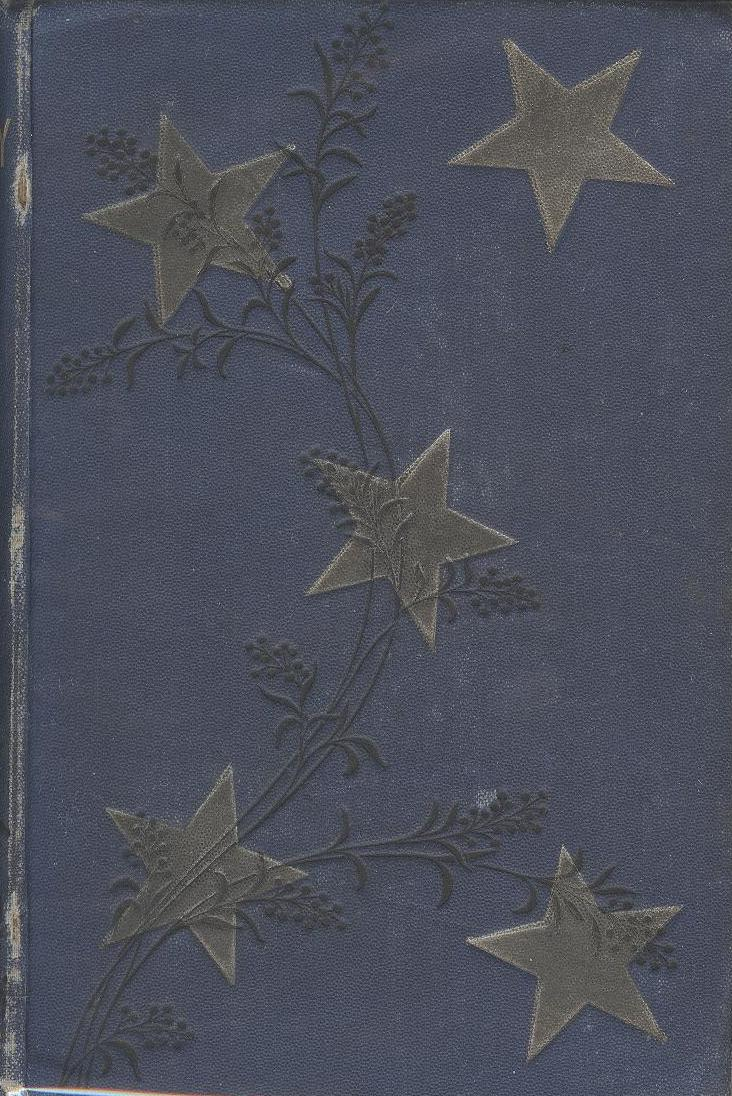
First edition cover for The Merry Men and Other Tales and Fables printed by Chatto & Windus 1887.

"Olalla" is a short story by the novelist, poet, essayist and travel writer Robert Louis Stevenson. It was first published in the Christmas 1885 issue of The Court and Society Review, then re-published in 1887 as part of the collection The Merry Men and Other Tales and Fables. It is set in Spain during the Peninsular War.

The story is based on a dream that Stevenson had and in his 1888 essay "A Chapter on Dreams" he describes the difficulties he had in fitting his vision into a narrative framework. Stevenson wrote the story at the same time as he was proofing "Strange Case of Dr Jekyll and Mr Hyde" (published 1886).

== Plot summary ==
The story is told in first person by a nameless Scottish soldier. He is recovering from his wounds in a Spanish hospital, where his doctor suggests he take up temporary residence with a local family, but with their stipulation that he remain a stranger to them. The once-noble family consists of a mother, a son (Felipe), and a daughter (Olalla). The Scotsman is welcomed by the son and begins to develop a casual friendliness with the mother. Both are described as "stupid" and "slothful" but the narrator emphasizes the simple pleasure of their company. The narrator becomes fixated on a portrait in his room of a presumably long-dead young woman.

Some time passes without sight of Olalla and when she finally appears, the protagonist falls desperately in love with her (largely due to her resemblance to the portrait), and she with him. He recognizes an extraordinary intellect in the girl and expresses a desire to take her away from the decaying home of her kinsmen. They profess their love for each other, but Olalla urges the man to leave at once, keeping her always in his memory. He refuses, and during the night, he breaks his window trying distractedly to open it. The shattering glass cuts his wrist and he applies to Olalla's mother for help. At the sight of his wound, she leaps upon him and bites into his arm. Felipe arrives in time to wrestle his mother away from the narrator and Olalla tends to his injuries.

The narrator leaves the residence very shortly thereafter, but lingers in the nearby town. One day, he strikes up a conversation with a retired muleteer and inquires about the history of Olalla's house. The muleteer tells him how years ago, his companion was lured into the house by a mysterious woman in a snowstorm, and was subsequently never seen again. He further claims that the house is long abandoned.

The narrator is sitting on a hill beside an effigy of the crucified Christ when he meets Olalla for the last time. She tells him, "We are all such as He," and states that there is a "sparkle of the divine" in all human beings. "Like Him," she says, "we must endure for a little while, until morning returns bringing peace." At this, the narrator departs, looking back but once to see Olalla leaning on the crucifix.

== The Gothic Tradition ==
"Olalla" contains many of the trademark elements of Gothic fiction. There is a once-proud family of failing nobility, a lonely home in a mountain setting and a preoccupation with death and decay. Stevenson also focuses on the subject of heredity, demonstrated by a family portrait to which Olalla bears an uncanny resemblance. This was a very popular Gothic device, famously employed by Sheridan Le Fanu in his short story "Carmilla" and by Sir Arthur Conan Doyle in the Sherlock Holmes novel The Hound of the Baskervilles. Heredity and decadence cannot but remind us of Edgar Allan Poe's "The Fall of the House of Usher".

"Olalla" has been variously interpreted as a vampire story and contains some familiar tropes, such as the red hair of Olalla and her mother and their deeper voices. However, this interpretation is ambiguous. Many vampires in fiction for example cannot go out in the day, but that's not true of all—Carmilla in the Le Fanu story can go out in the day. Olalla's Christianity also conflicts with typical conventions. This story touches little on these conventions, but then those conventions are not universal in vampire fiction.

The scene in which the Scotsman has deeply cut his hand and is attacked in a hysterical blood-drinking fashion by Olalla's mother does indeed ring of vampirism. However, the story makes clear that the narrator regards this as the basest of animal behaviour and does not ascribe any supernatural causes.
