= Erraid =

Tidal island to the west of Mull in the Inner Hebrides of Scotland

Eilean Earraid (Gaelic)
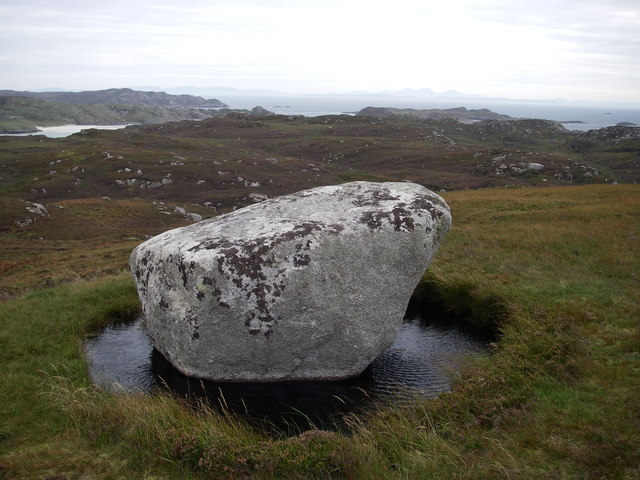
- Rock near the summit of Cnoc Mòr

Location
- Erraid shown relative to Mull
- OS grid reference: NM298199
- Coordinates: 56.29°N 6.36°W

Name
- Gaelic pronunciation: [ˈelan ˈɛrˠɪtʲ]
- Name meaning: Tidal island (Old Gaelic name: Arthraigh)

Physical geography
- Island group: Mull
- Area: 187 ha (3/4 sq mi)
- Area rank: 112
- Highest elevation: Cnoc Mòr, 75 m (246 ft)

Administration
- Council area: Argyll and Bute
- Country: Scotland
- Sovereign state: United Kingdom

Demographics
- Population: 6
- Population rank: 76=
- Population density: 3.2/km^{2} (8.3/sq mi)

Erraid (Scottish Gaelic: Eilean Earraid) is a tidal island approximately one mile (two kilometres) square located in the Inner Hebrides of Scotland. It lies west of Mull (to which it is linked by a beach at low tide) and southeast of Iona. The island receives about 1,000 millimetres (40 in) of rain and 1,350 hours of sunshine annually, making it one of the driest and sunniest places on the western seaboard of Scotland. It is attended by numerous uninhabited small islets, the largest being Eilean Dubh (of which there are two), Eilean nam Muc, Eilean Chalmain, Eilean Ghomain and Eilean na Seamair.

The island features a disused signal station for the lighthouses on Dubh Artach and Skerryvore and a row of cottages built for the lighthouse keepers.

Satish Kumar has also visited the island and his autobiography includes an account of the event.

The island is privately owned and is home to an intentional community, linked to the Findhorn Foundation.

There is a well-known anchorage on the western side of the island called 'Tinker's Hole'. It is a deep but narrow channel between Erraid and the westernmost of the islets called Eilean Dubh.

In 2021, Ben Fogle's long-running hit Channel 5 series 'New Lives in the Wild' visited the island to record an episode with one of the permanent community members living there (Philip Hetherington). The episode aired on 21 September 2021.

== Kidnapped ==
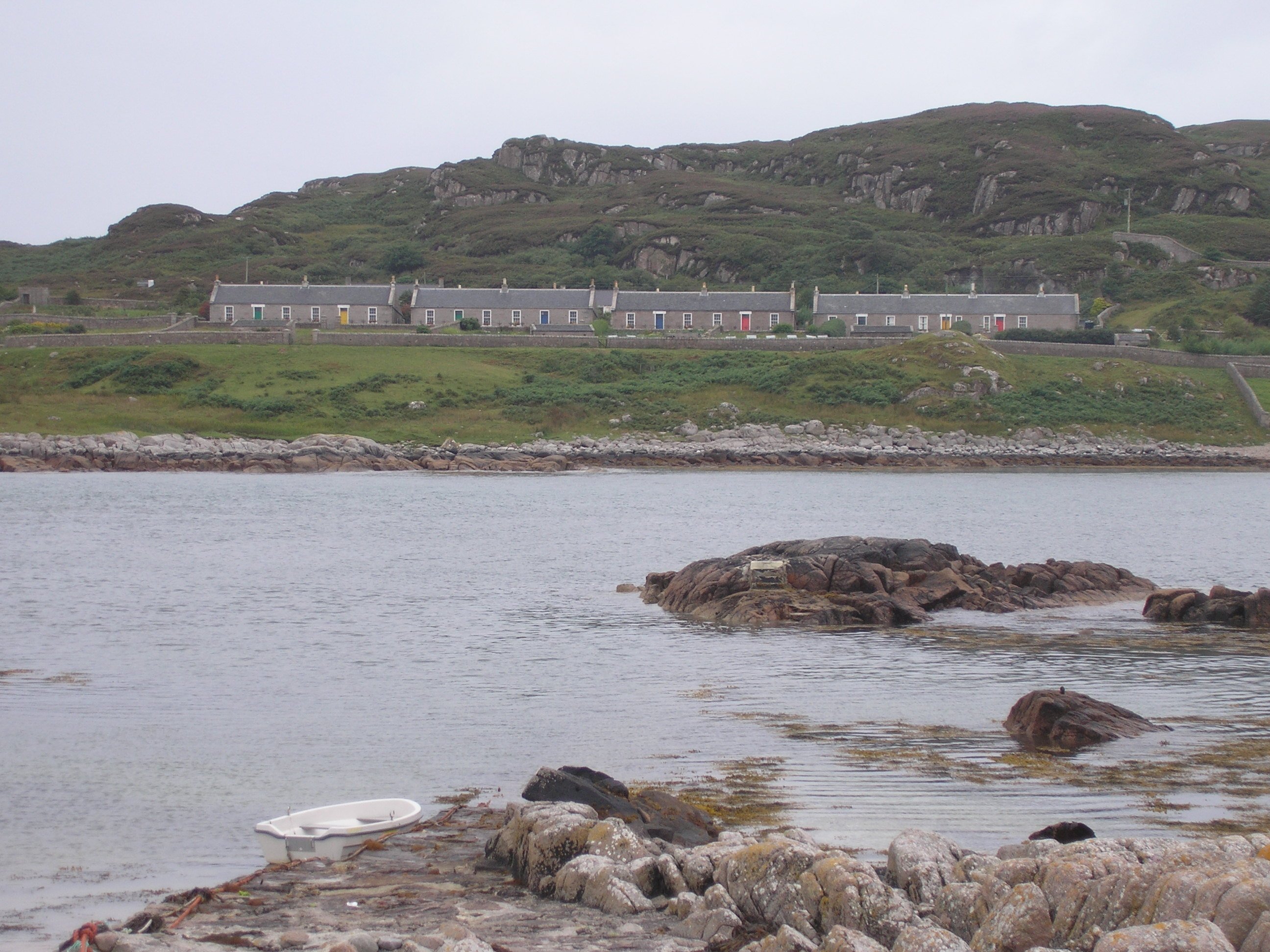
The cottages constructed by the Northern Lighthouse Board circa 1872

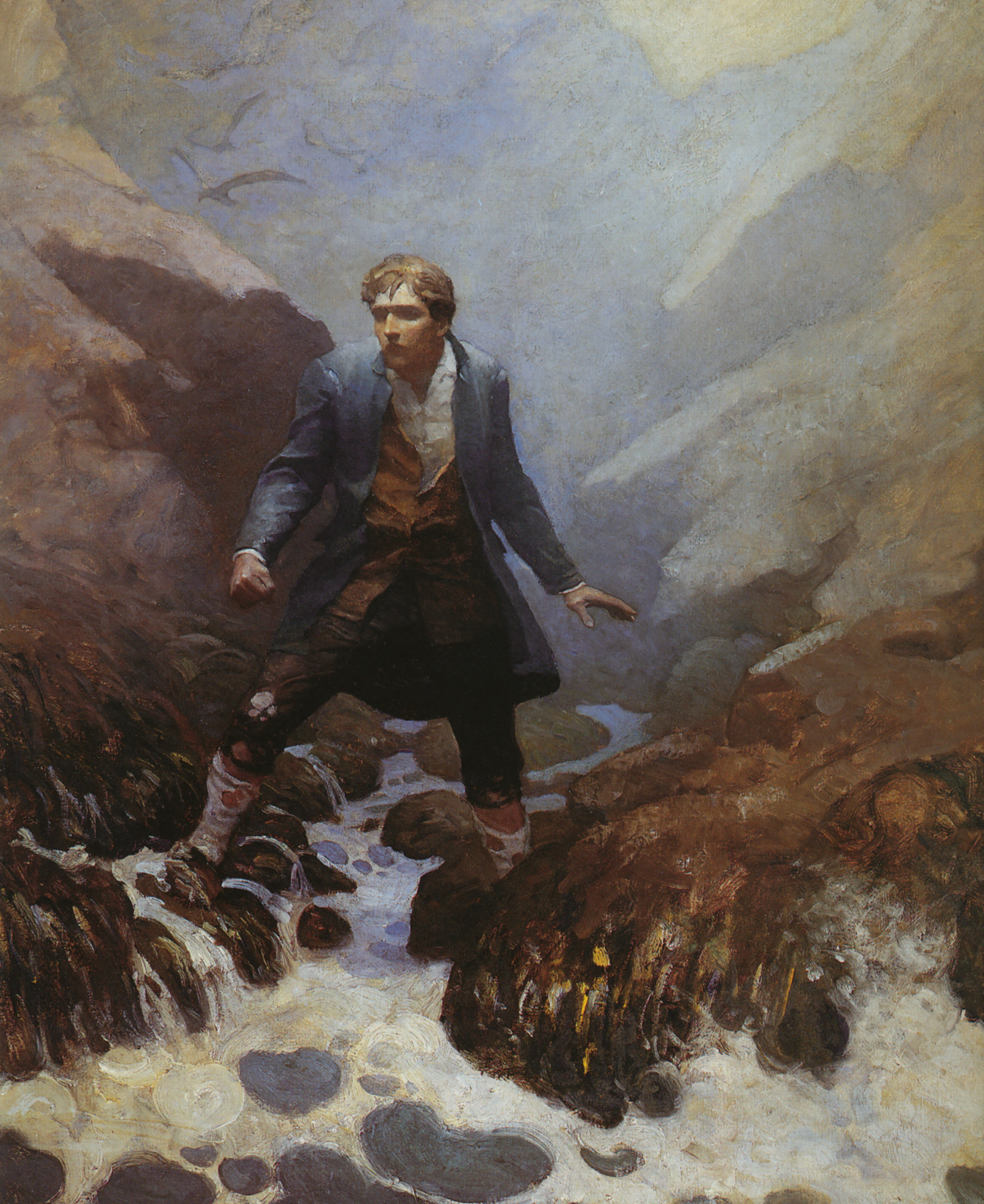
On the Island of Earraid, a 1913 oil painting by N. C. Wyeth for an illustrated version of Kidnapped

Pronunciation
Scots Gaelic	Pronunciation
Arthraigh	[ˈaɾhɾaj]
Eilean Chalmain	[ˈelan ˈxal̪ˠamɛɲ]
Eilean Dubh	[ˈelan ˈt̪uh]
Eilean Earraid	[ˈelan ˈɛrˠɪtʲ]
Eilean Ghomain	[ˈelan ˈɣomɛɲ]
Eilean nam Muc	[ˈelan nə ˈmuxk]
Eilean na Seamair	[ˈelan nə ˈʃɛmɪɾʲ]

Erraid is one of the locations featured in the novel Kidnapped by Robert Louis Stevenson. David Balfour, the hero of this tale was marooned for a while on the island having been shipwrecked on the Torran Rocks, which lie to the south. Stevenson's father, Thomas was involved in the construction of the nearby lighthouses, and the stones for Dhu Heartach were quarried on the island, and the young Robert Louis visited the island on several occasions, recalling one such excursion in his book Memories and Portraits. He later based the fictional island of Aros, the setting of his short story "The Merry Men", on the island.

Davie Balfour is trapped on the island by his ignorance, and as he says in Kidnapped: Chapter XIV-

A sea-bred boy would not have stayed a day on Earraid; which is only what they call a tidal islet, and except in the bottom of the neaps, can be entered and left twice in every twenty-four hours, either dry-shod, or at the most by wading. Even I, who had the tide going out and in before me in the bay, and even watched for the ebbs, the better to get my shellfish—even I (I say) if I had sat down to think, instead of raging at my fate, must have soon guessed the secret, and got free. It was no wonder the fishers had not understood me. The wonder was rather that they had ever guessed my pitiful illusion, and taken the trouble to come back. I had starved with cold and hunger on that island for close upon one hundred hours. But for the fishers, I might have left my bones there, in pure folly. And even as it was, I had paid for it pretty dear, not only in past sufferings, but in my present case; being clothed like a beggar-man, scarce able to walk, and in great pain of my sore throat.

Stevenson also includes a description of the island:

It was still the roughest kind of walking; indeed the whole, not only of Earraid, but of the neighbouring part of Mull (which they call the Ross) is nothing but a jumble of granite rocks with heather in among.

Davie Balfour stayed alive during his stay on the island by eating limpets:

I knew indeed that shell-fish were counted good to eat; and among the rocks of the isle I found a great plenty of limpets, which at first I could scarcely strike from their places, not knowing quickness to be needful. There were, besides, some of the little shells that we call buckies; I think periwinkle is the English name. Of these two I made my whole diet, devouring them cold and raw as I found them; and so hungry was I, that at first they seemed to me delicious.

== See also ==
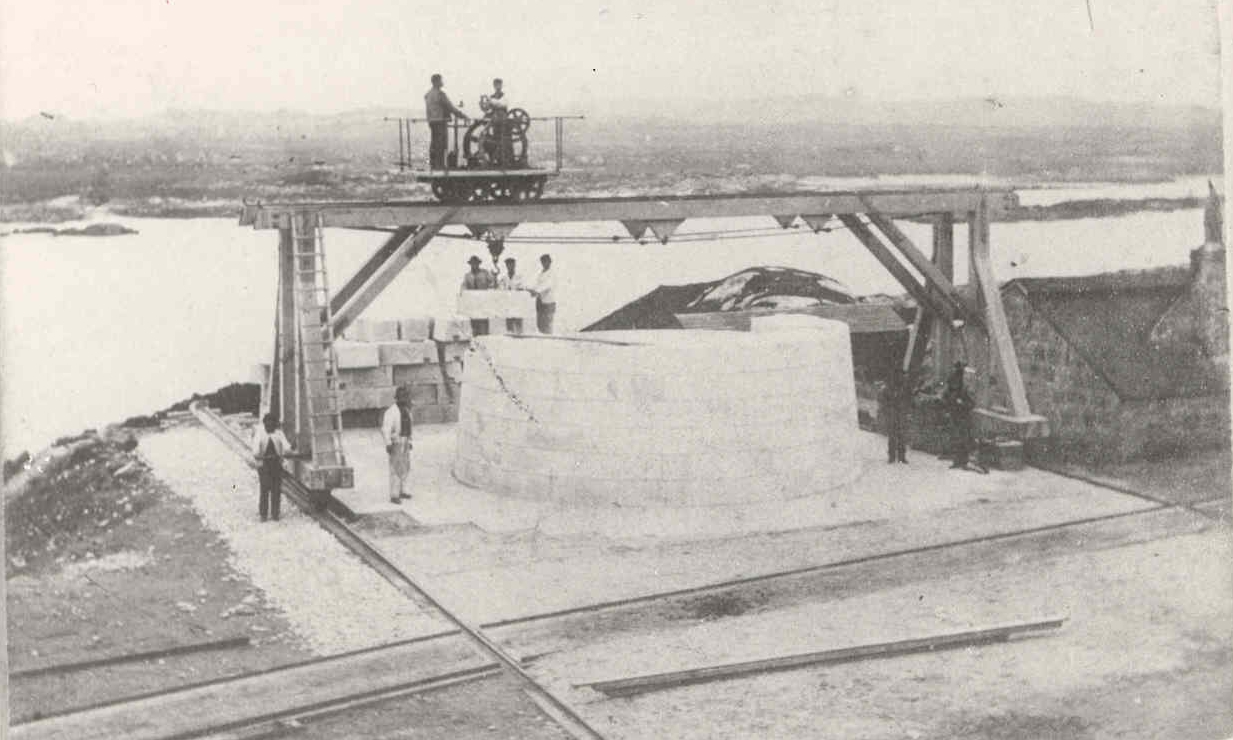
Fitting of blocks for Dubh Artach lighthouse on Erraid prior to erection on site.

- Dubh Artach
- Skerryvore
- Camas Tuath
