= Ross of Mull =

Peninsula on the Isle of Mull, Scotland

Native name: An Ros Mhuileach (Scottish Gaelic)
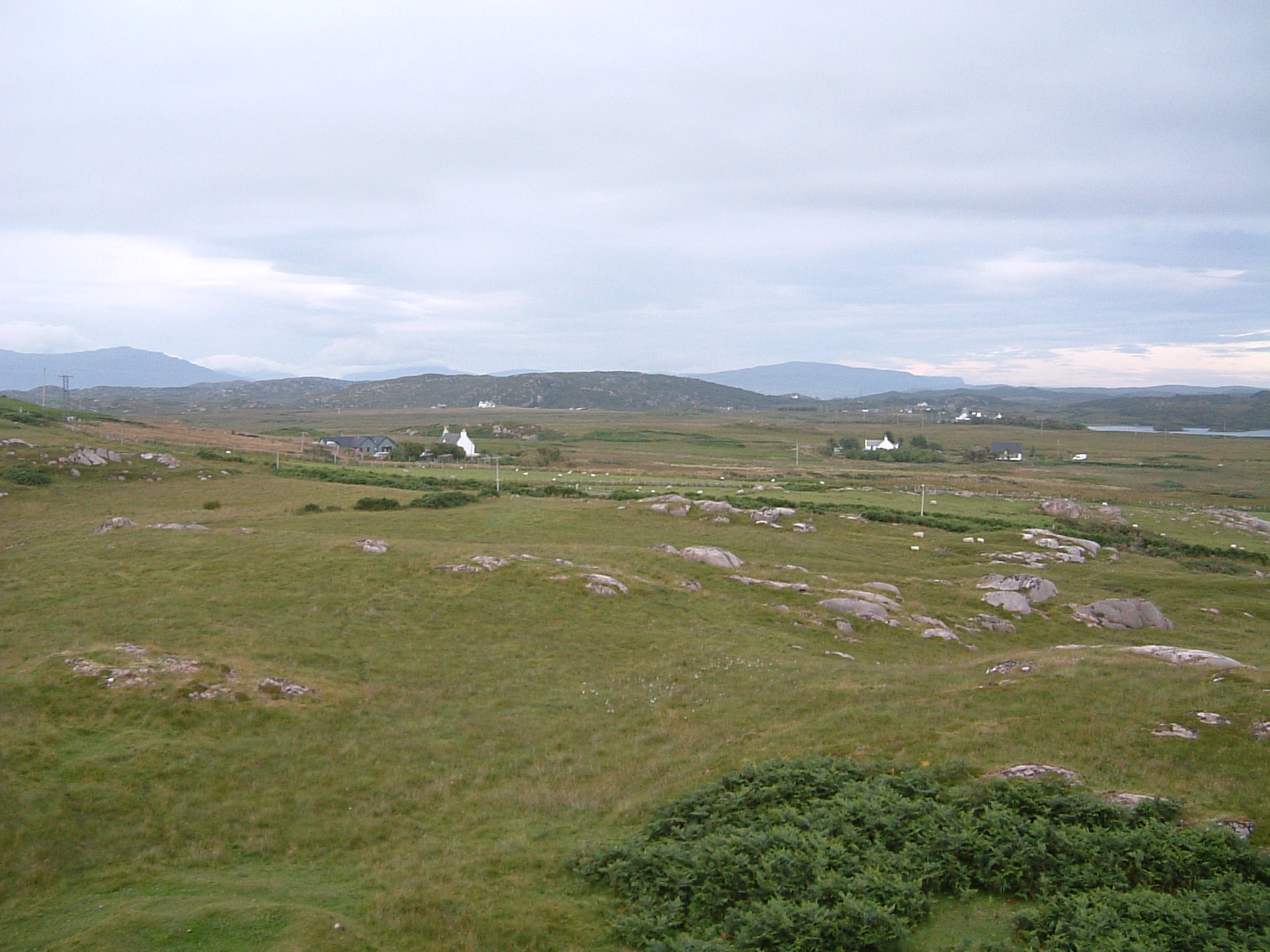
- View east over the Ross of Mull from Tor Mor Quarry, Fionnphort

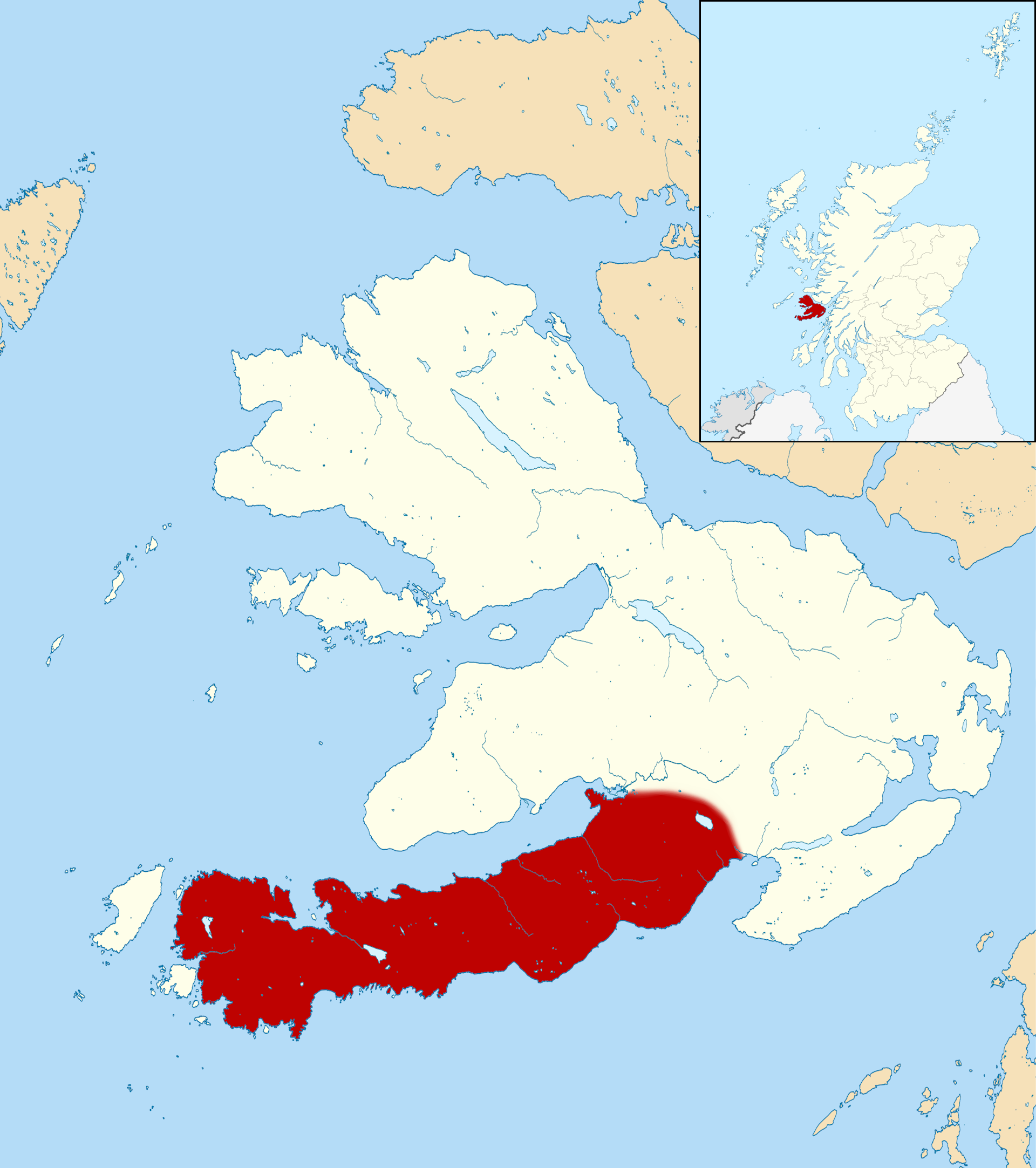

Geography
- Location: Isle of Mull
- Coordinates: 56°18′25″N 6°17′8″W

Administration
- Scotland

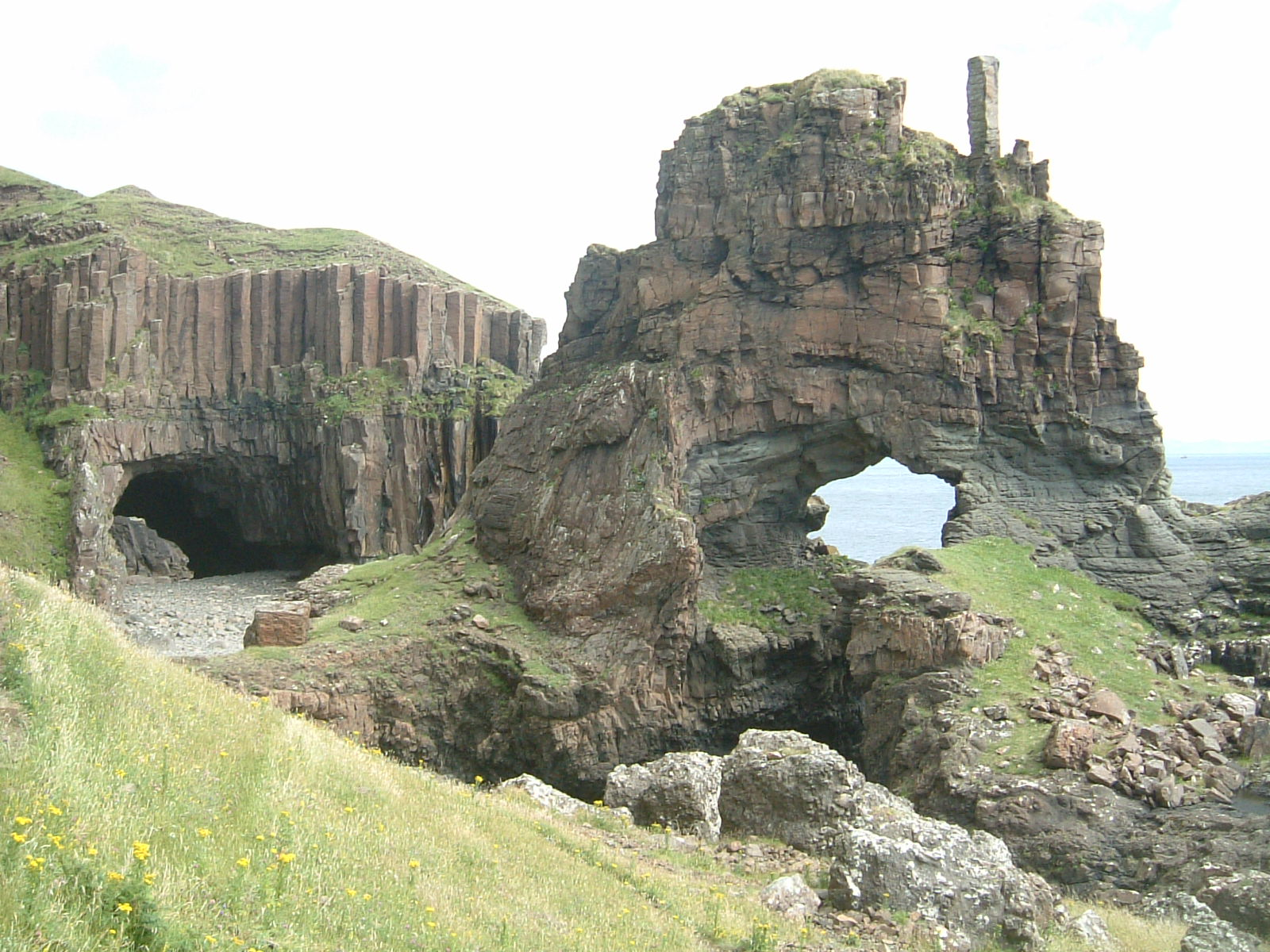
Carsaig Arches on the south of the Ross

The Ross of Mull (Scottish Gaelic: An Ros Mhuileach) is the largest peninsula of the Isle of Mull, about 28 kilometres (17 mi) long, and makes up the south-western part of the island. It is bounded to the north by Loch Scridain and to the south by the Firth of Lorne. The main villages are Bunessan and Fionnphort, with smaller settlements including Ardtun, Camas, Carsaig, Knockan, Pennyghael and Uisken. Knocknafenaig, Suidhe, and Shiaba are three of the many cleared settlements on the Ross.

Historically the area's main industries consisted of crofting, fishing, kelp, and granite quarries. By 2011 this had shifted with tourism becoming the greatest employer accounting for 29% of employment, while between them farming and fishing made up 15%.

The 1886 novel Kidnapped by Robert Louis Stevenson is partially set on the island of Erraid, a tidal island to the south west of the Ross of Mull.

The 1945 film I Know Where I'm Going!, directed by Michael Powell and Emeric Pressburger, was principally shot on Mull, using Carsaig as a headquarters, and references the fictional "Isle of Kiloran", which was based on Colonsay. Other scenes were shot at Duart Castle and Calgary. Also shot there was The Silent Storm, starring Damian Lewis and Andrea Riseborough.
