= Thrawn Janet =

1881 short story by Robert Louis Stevenson

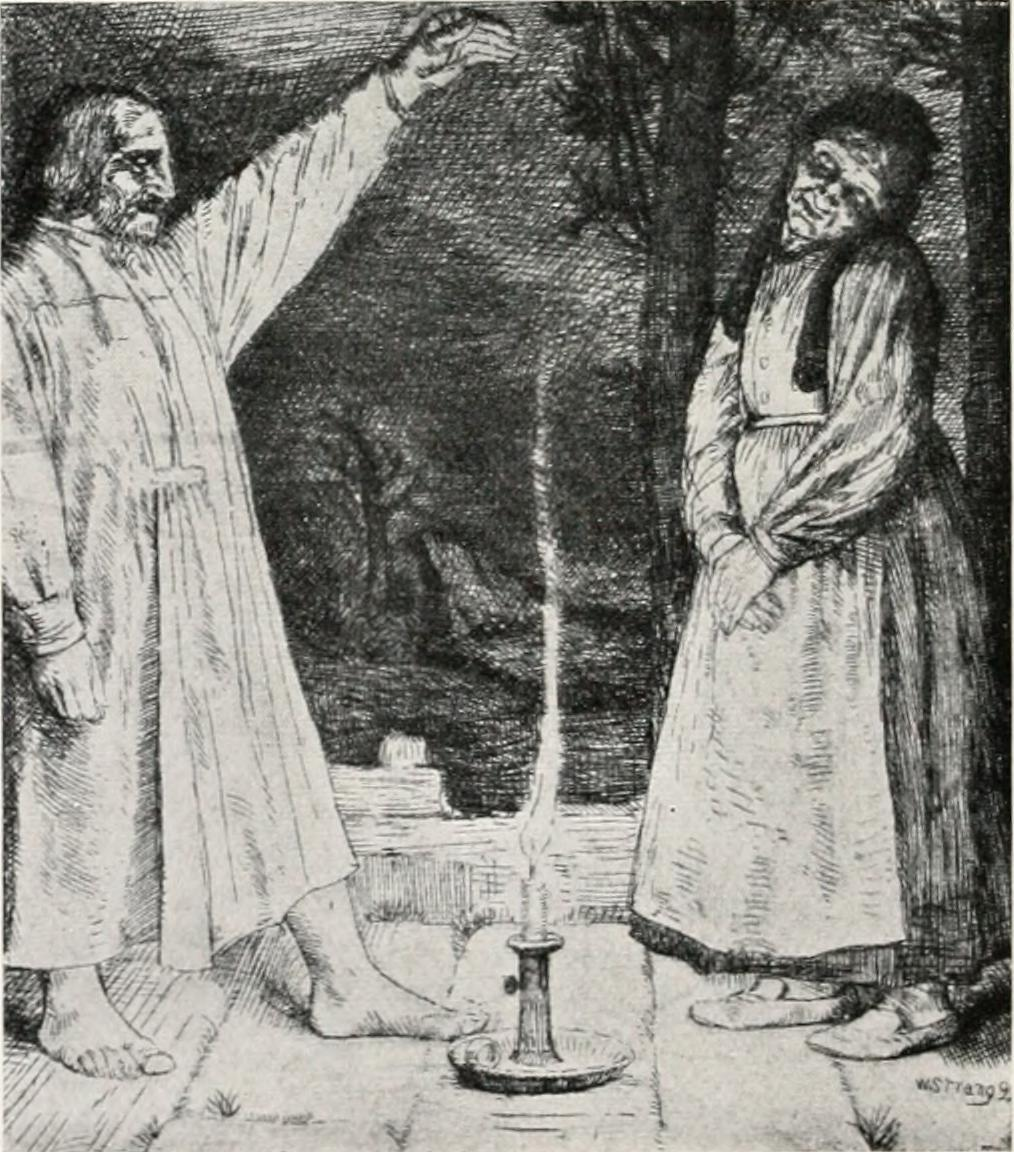
"Thrawn Janet" illustration, from William Strang: Catalogue of His Etched Work (1906)

"Thrawn Janet" is an 1881 short story, written in Scots, by the Scottish author Robert Louis Stevenson. He wrote the story in the summer of 1881 while he stayed at the rented Kinnaird Cottage in Kinnaird, a hamlet near Pitlochry, with his parents and wife. When he read the story to his wife Fanny Stevenson, she said of it that it "sent a cauld grue [shudder] along my bones" and "fair frightened" Stevenson himself. It was first published in the October 1881 issue of the Cornhill Magazine. It is a dark tale of satanic possession.

The story was later included in Stevenson's 1887 collection The Merry Men, and Other Tales and Fables.

== Plot summary ==
In 1712, a newly graduated preacher arrives in a small town, and hires Janet, an old crone, as his housekeeper—a woman whom many of the townspeople believe to be in league with the devil. When some of the local women attempt to dunk Janet in the river to prove that she is a witch, the preacher rescues her and has her abjure the devil before them. From the next day forward, Janet's appearance is altered; she has a thrawn (twisted) neck, with her head on one side, like someone who has been hanged. Later, after an encounter with a strange "black man" in the churchyard, the preacher finds Janet's corpse hanging by a thread from a nail in her room. He is pursued by the dead woman's body, until he invokes the power of God. The body turns to ash, and the black man, believed to be the devil, leaves town. Thereafter, the preacher often frightens his flock with the intensity of his admonitions against the forces of evil.

== Publication history ==
The story is one of only two stories ever written by Stevenson in Scots, the other being "The Tale of Tod Lapraik". Stevenson was aware that his readers might not understand the broad Scots the story was written in and so fully expected the Cornhill Magazine to reject "Thrawn Janet" on its first submission. However, Cornhill Magazine's editor, Leslie Stephen, put it straight into print in the next issue.
