= Memories and Portraits =

Book by Robert Louis Stevenson

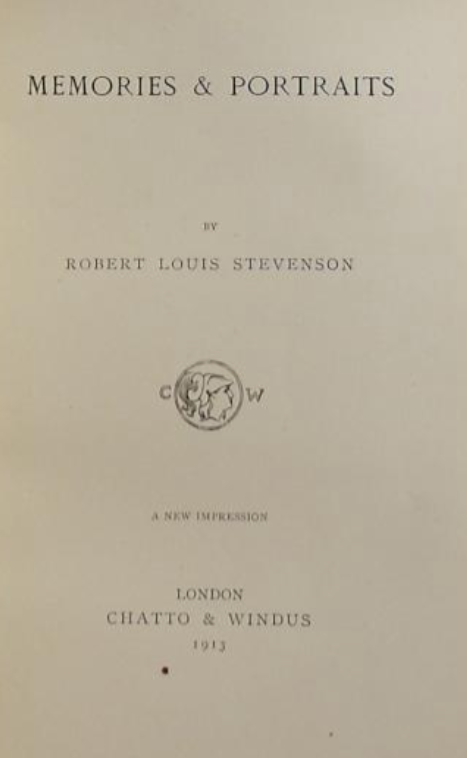
- Title page for Memories and Portraits (1913 edition)
- Author: Robert Louis Stevenson
- Language: English
- Publisher: Chatto and Windus
- Publication date: November 1887
- Publication place: Scotland
- Media type: Print (Hardback)

Memories and Portraits is a collection of essays by Robert Louis Stevenson, first published in 1887.

== Contents ==
- I. The Foreigner at Home
- II. Some College Memories
- III. Old Morality
- IV. A College Magazine
- V. An Old Scotch Gardener
- VI. Pastoral
- VII. The Manse
- VIII. Memories of an Islet
- IX. Thomas Stevenson
- X. Talk And Talkers: First Paper
- XI. Talk And Talkers: Second Paper
- XII. The Character of Dogs
- XIII. "A Penny Plain and Twopence Coloured"
- XIV. A Gossip on a Novel of Dumas's
- XV. A Gossip on Romance
- XVI. A Humble Remonstrance
