= Rohr =

Rohr may refer to:

== Places ==
=== Austria ===
- Rohr bei Hartberg, in Styria
- Rohr im Burgenland, in Burgenland
- Rohr im Gebirge, in Lower Austria
- Rohr im Kremstal, in Upper Austria

=== Canada ===
- Mount Rohr, in the Coast Mountains, BC

=== France ===
- Rohr, Bas-Rhin, in the Bas-Rhin département

=== Germany ===
- Rohr, Thuringia, in the Schmalkalden-Meiningen district, Thuringia
- Rohr, Middle Franconia, in the Roth district, Bavaria
- Rohr in Niederbayern, in the Kelheim district, Bavaria
- A part of Plattling in the Deggendorf district, Bavaria
- A part of Waltenhofen in the Oberallgäu district, Bavaria
- A part of Blankenheim in the Euskirchen district, North Rhine-Westphalia
- A part of Freystadt in the Neumarkt in der Oberpfalz district, Bavaria
- A part of Rohrbach in the Pfaffenhofen an der Ilm district, Bavaria
- A part of Eurasburg in the Bad Tölz-Wolfratshausen district, Bavaria
- A part of Neudrossenfeld in the Kulmbach district, Bavaria
- A part of Weilheim in the Waldshut district, Baden-Württemberg
- A part of Günzach in the Ostallgäu, Bavaria
- A part of Vaihingen (Stuttgart), in Stuttgart, Baden-Württemberg

=== Switzerland ===
- Rohr, Aargau, in the Canton of Aargau
- Rohr, Solothurn, in the Canton of Solothurn

=== United States ===
- Rohr, West Virginia

== Other uses ==
- Rohr (surname)
- Rohr, Inc. (formerly Rohr Industries)
- British Standard Pipe threads where Rohr (German for pipe) indicates a tapered thread.

== See also ==
- Röhr (disambiguation)
- Von Rohr
