= Johan Cronman =

Swedish military officer (1662–1737)

- Cronman coat-of-arms

2nd Governor of Malmöhus County
- In office 1727–1737
- Preceded by: Carl Gustaf Hård
- Succeeded by: Wilhelm Bennet

Commandant of Malmö Castle
- In office 1727–1737

Personal details
- Born: November 2, 1662 Unanitz, Swedish Ingria
- Died: July 26, 1737 (aged 74) Malmö, Sweden
- Resting place: Caroli Church, Malmö
- Parent(s): Joakim Cronman (1638–1703); Lunetta Makeléer (1639–1693)
- Relatives: Fritz Cronman, uncle John Hans Makeléer, grandfather Joachim von Rohr, nephew

Military service
- Allegiance: (Sweden) Swedish Empire
- Rank: Lieutenant-general

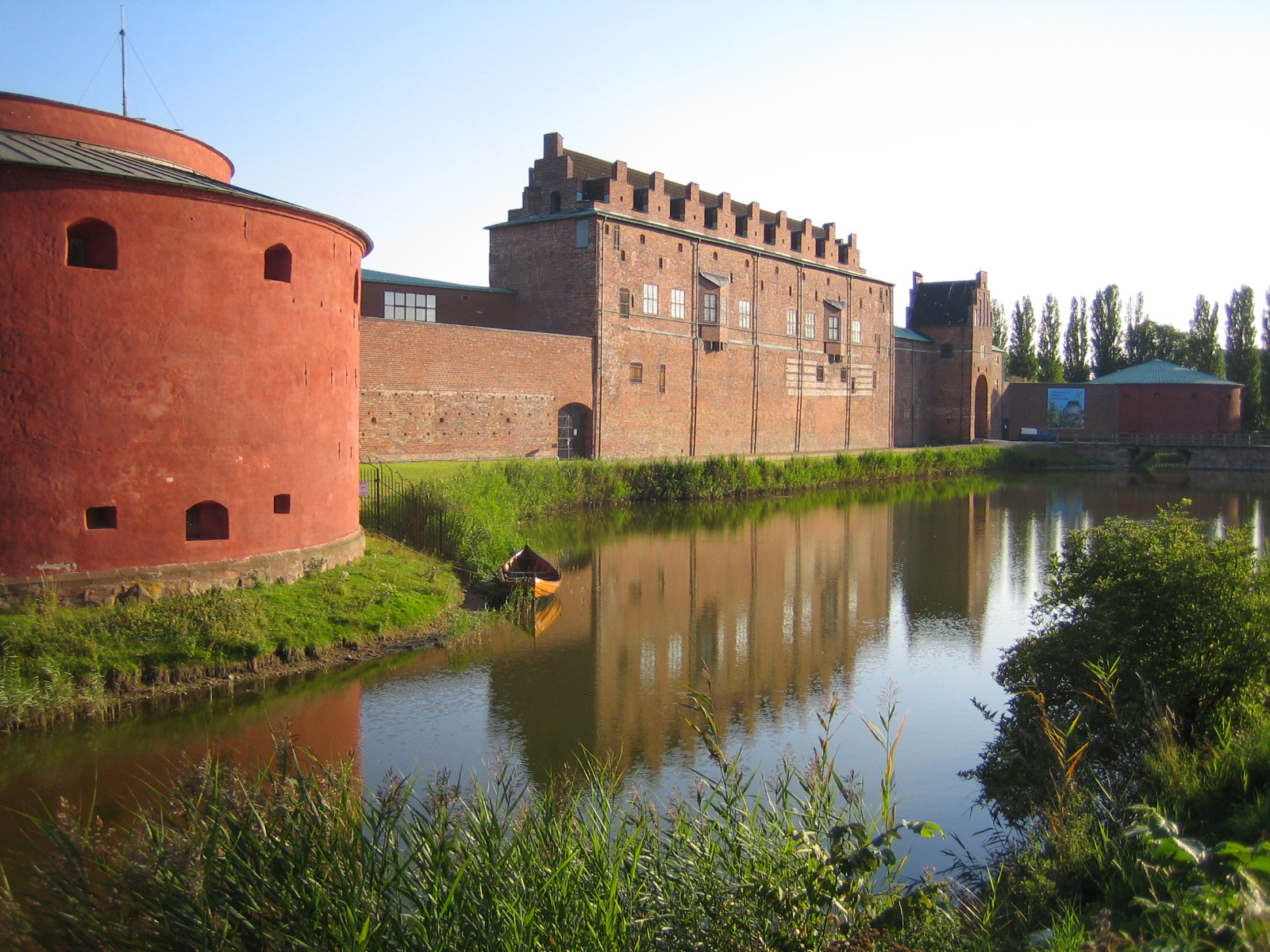
Cronman was Commandant of Malmö Castle, the largest fortification in Skåne

Johan Cronman (November 2, 1662 – July 26, 1737) was a lieutenant general and the commandant of the Skåne fortress in the Swedish Empire as well as the Governor of Malmöhus County from 1727 to 1737. He was Baron of Alatskivi, Kodafer and Kokora; and Master of Vosuauer and Sattkula.

== Biography ==
He was born on November 2, 1662, in Unanitz, Ingria. He was the son of Joakim Cronman (1638–1703) and Lunetta Makeléer (1639–1693). Lunetta was the daughter of John Hans Makeléer who was a merchant and banker who had emigrated from Scotland to Sweden. Johan joined the military and was commissioned as a lieutenant with the Narva garrison, and second captain with the Närke and Värmland regiments in 1687. He was promoted to captain with the Zurlauben regiment in 1699, and was made a lieutenant-colonel in 1701. He was promoted to colonel of the Kronoberg Regiment in 1706. On July 11, 1709, he was at surrender at Perevolochna and held prisoner in Siberia until 1722. Johan returned to Sweden after his release and was promoted to lieutenant-general of the infantry in 1722. He was made a baron in 1727, and named the Governor of Malmö and commandant of Malmö Castle, both in 1727. Through his life, he fought in 13 battles, but was never wounded. He spoke 8 languages: Swedish, Latin, German, Estonian, Polish, Russian, French and Dutch. He died on July 26, 1737, at age 75. He had never married or had children.

== Legacy ==
A plaque at St Petri, Malmö, reads in German:

Ihro Konigl:r Maij:ts Zu Schweden Wolbestalter Generallientenant der Infanterie Landes Hauptman und OberCommendannt der Festungen Zu Schonen Hochwolgebohren Baron H:r Johan Cronman Freijherr Von Alatskivi Kadaster und Kakara Herr Von Vosuauer Sattkula Gebohren Auf Alatskivi 1662 den 2 Novemb. Gelich Gestorben In Malmö den 26 Julii 1737.

It translates into English as:

His Royal Majesty of Sweden recognizes Lieutenant General of the Infantry, Governor and High Commandant at the Fortress of Skåne, Honourable Baron Mr. Johan Cronman, Baron to Alatskivi, Kodafer and Kokora, Master of Wasuva (possibly) and Sottkylä (possibly). Born at Alatskivi November 2, 1662. Died in Malmö on July 26, 1737.

A plaque at Caroli Church in Malmö reads:

Hier ligt der weyland hoch geborne herr baron general lieutenant landshauptmann und ober commandant Johann Cronmann. Freyherr von alt und neu Alatskivi. Herr von Kokara und Sottkyl. Anno 1737

It translates into English as:

Here lies Lieutenant General, Baron, Governor, and Commandant Johan Cronmann. Baron of old and new Alatskivi. Lord of Kokora and Sottkylä. Year 1737

== See also ==
- Military ranks of the Swedish Armed Forces
- St Petri, Malmö

== Images ==
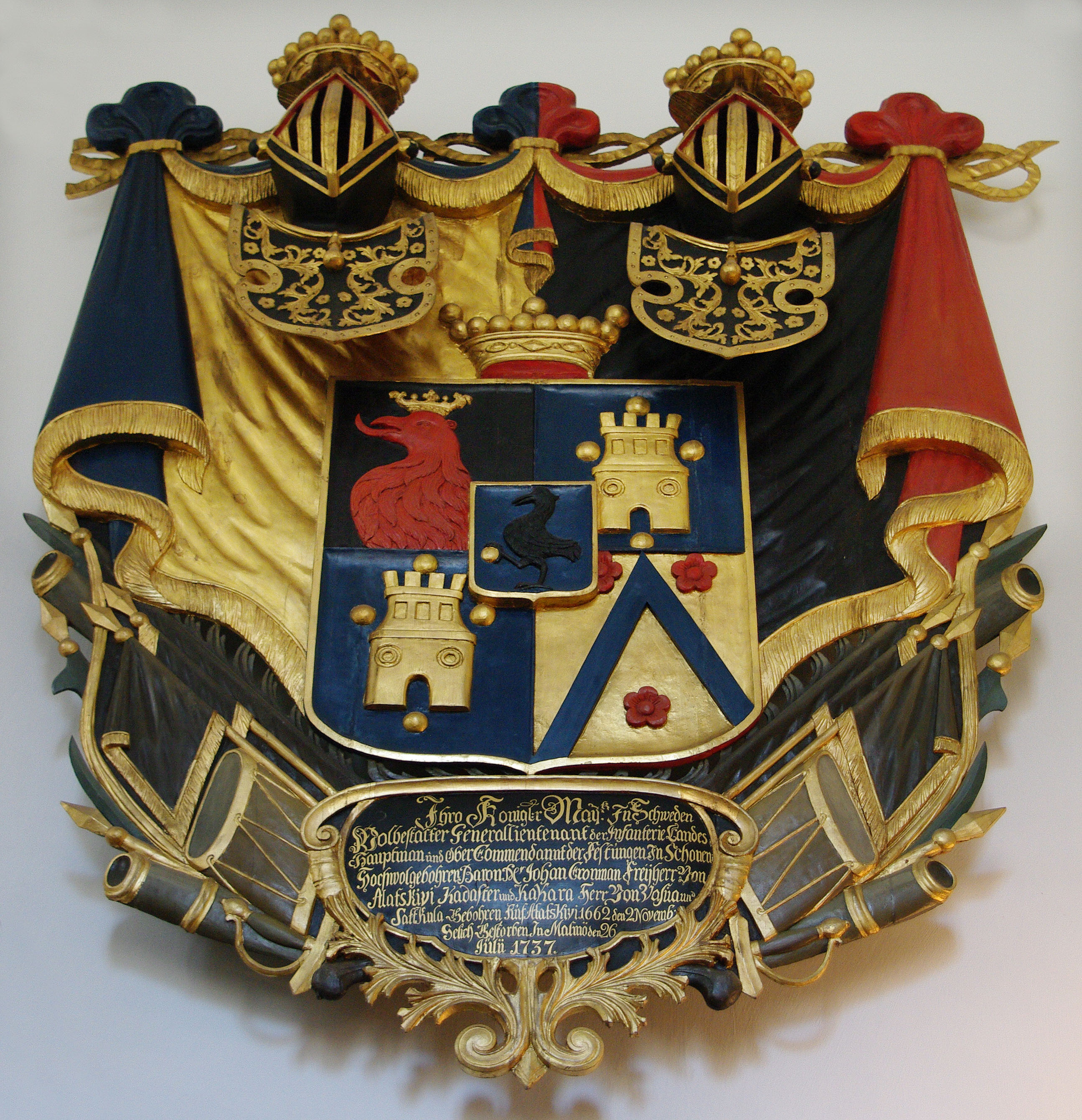
Plaque at St Petri, Malmö

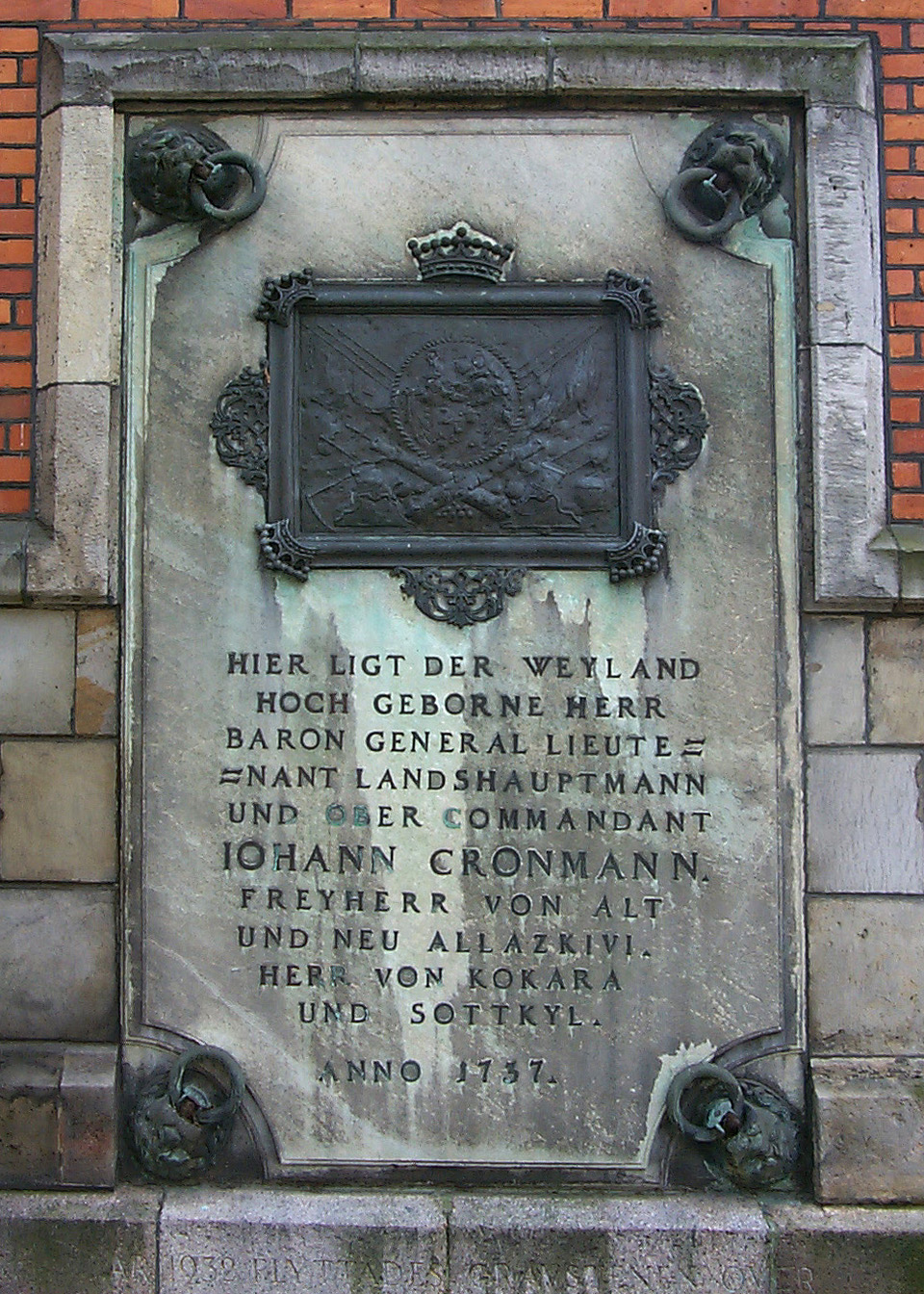
Plaque at Caroli Church, Malmö
