= Makeléer =

Makeléer Baronet coat-of-arms

The Makeléers are Swedish House of Nobility family 513. The earliest member was Hans Makeléer, 1st Baronet (1604-1666) who migrated to Sweden from Scotland.

Makeléer may refer to:

- David Makeléer, 1st Friherre (1646-1708), first governor of Älvsborg County, Sweden
- Hans Makeléer, 1st Baronet (1604-1666), Lord of Gåsevadholm, Hageby, and Hammersöö
- Johan Makeléer, 2nd Baronet (c1625–c1696), member of the Gothenburg Court of Justice
- Jacob Makeléer (died 1663), Oratio de invidia & mutabilitate fortunæ
