= Joachim Cronman =

Swedish colonel and estate owner

- Born: Joakim Cronman circa 1630–1640
- Died: March 5, 1703; Daugavgrīva castle
- Education: University of Tartu
- Occupation: Soldier
- Spouse: Lunetta Makeléer (m. 1657; died 1693)
- Children: Johan Cronman
- Parent(s): Hans Detterman Cronman (1590–aft.1645); Ursula Kordes (1600–1675)
- Relatives: Fritz Cronman, brother John Hans Makeléer, father-in-law Joachim von Rohr, grandson
- Military career
- Allegiance: (Sweden) Swedish Empire
- Service years: c1680-1703
- Rank: Colonel; Commandant of the Neumünde redoubt/fortlet (skans in Swedish)

Joachim Cronman (c. 1640 – March 5, 1703) was an owner of estates in Livonia and a colonel for the Swedish Empire. He was the Commandant of the Neumünde redoubt/fortlet (skans in Swedish).

== Biography ==
Joachim Cronman was the son of Hans Detterman Cronman (1590–c1645) and was born around 1640.

Hans was the war commissar for the Swedish Empire. Hans had been knighted as Lord Cronman by Christina, Queen of Sweden on March 9, 1638. He became Lord of Alatskivi Castle in Swedish Livonia in 1642.

Joachim's mother was Ursula Kordes (1600–1675), and she was the daughter of Joakim Kordes and Ursula Gantschau. His brother was Fritz Cronman and his sisters were Elisabeth Cronmann who married captain Johann Schulmann, landlord of Nova-Bura in Ingria; and Anna Catharina Cronman I (1620–1685) who married Frans von Knorring (1626–1694).

Joachim Cronman attended the University of Tartu. He married Lunetta Makeléer (1639–1693) on August 9, 1657, in Göteborg, Sweden. Lunetta was the daughter of Hans Makeléer, 1st Baronet who was the Lord of Gåsevadholm, and Hageby in Sweden.

Together, Cronman and his wife had the following children:

- Ursula Cronman (1660–1745), she married Christoffer Fredrik von Grothenhielm (1655–1705).
- Anna Catharina Cronman II (c.1661–1661), who died as an infant
- Johan Cronman (1662–1737), he became Governor of Malmö.
- Hedvik Elisabeth Cronman (1663–1699) who married Henrik Aminoff (1653–?). After her husband's death she married Simon von Rohr (c1650–1721).
- Anna Catharina Cronman III (c.1660–1685) married Captain Hans Christoffer von Rohr (1627-c.1712) and had as their child: Joachim von Rohr (1678–1757), a lieutenant colonel and commandant of the Dalarö fortress. Hans Christoffer von Rohr I was killed in action in the Battle of Narva.
- Eva Maria Cronman (1675–1706) who married rittmeister Arend Wilhelm von Rehbinder (?–1711), lord of the Jõesse manor in Martna Parish.

Cronman became a colonel on January 23, 1679. He was later stationed at the Narva fortress. On March 10, 1685, he was assigned to the Savolaks and Nyslott regiment. He later served as commandant of the Neumünde fortress. He died on March 5, 1703, at Neumünde.
