= Cronman =

Cronman or sometimes von Cronman

- Fritz Cronman (c. 1635-?), Swedish diplomat to Russia
- Hans Detterman Cronman (c. 1600-?), Swedish lord of Alatskivi and war commissar who married Ursula Kordes (1600–1675)
- Joachim Cronman (c. 1635 – 1703), Swedish commandant of Neumünde
- Johan Cronman (1662–1737) Swedish governor of Malmö from 1727 to 1737, and commandant of Skåne
