= Rutger Macklier =

Friherre Rutger Maclean I (1688–1748) or Rutger Macklean I was an officer of Charles XII of Sweden who participated in Battle of Holowczyn, Battle of Poltava and Battle of Tobolsk in the Great Northern War.

== Biography ==
He was the son of David Makeléer, the first governor of Älvsborg County in Sweden. He studied in England. He married Vilhelmina Eleonora Coyet, who was 30 years younger than him, and they had at least four children:

- Baron David Macklean
- Rutger Macklean II (1742–1816) who was a central figure in land reform in Sweden in the late 18th and early 19th centuries
- Eleonora Charlotta Macklean (1744–1777) born on 12 June 1744 in Svaneholm
- Gustaf Macklean, when Gustav III of Sweden was murdered, Gustaf hid one of the murderers at his farm Brodda, nearby Svaneholm.

== Ancestors ==
Rutger Macklier's ancestors in three generations
Rutger Macklier	Father: David Makeléer	Paternal Grandfather: John Hans Makeléer	Paternal Great-Grandfather: Hector Og Maclean, 15th Clan Chief
Rutger Macklier	Father: David Makeléer	Paternal Grandfather: John Hans Makeléer	Paternal Great-grandmother: Isabella Acheson of Gosford, the daughter of Sir Archibald Acheson, 1st Baronet
Rutger Macklier	Father: David Makeléer	Paternal Grandmother: Anna Gubbertz	Paternal Great-Grandfather:
Rutger Macklier	Father: David Makeléer	Paternal Grandmother: Anna Gubbertz	Paternal Great-Grandmother:
Rutger Macklier	Mother: Eleonora Elisabet von Ascheberg	Maternal Grandfather: Rutger von Ascheberg	Maternal Great-Grandfather:
Rutger Macklier	Mother: Eleonora Elisabet von Ascheberg	Maternal Grandfather: Rutger von Ascheberg	Maternal Great-Grandmother:
Rutger Macklier	Mother: Eleonora Elisabet von Ascheberg	Maternal Grandmother: Magdalena Eleonora von Bussech	Maternal Great-grandfather:
Rutger Macklier	Mother: Eleonora Elisabet von Ascheberg	Maternal Grandmother: Magdalena Eleonora von Bussech	Maternal Great-Grandmother:
