= Anders Örbom =

Swedish Army captain (1675–1740)

- Jämtland Ranger Regiment
- Born: May 9, 1675; Örebro, Sweden
- Died: May 25, 1740 (aged 65); Rödön, Sweden
- Military career
- Allegiance: Swedish Empire
- Branch: Jämtland Ranger Regiment
- Service years: 1691–1740
- Rank: Captain
- Conflicts: Battle of Klissow; Battle of Pułtusk; Battle of Reusch-Lemberg; Battle of Fraustadt; Battle of Poltava

Anders Örbom (9 May 1675 – 25 May 1740) was a captain in the Swedish Army who was at the Surrender at Perevolochna and taken to Siberia as a prisoner of war for 13 years.

== Biography ==
Örbom was born in Örebro, Sweden on 9 May 1675 to a man named Brask, who was a district court judge in Örebro. The record of his birth has not been found in Örebro, he may have been born without a family name, only a patronym, and was assigned a family name when he became a soldier. He joined the regiment of Närke in 1691, where Örebro is located. In this regiment, Örbom was already a common soldier's name, and his predecessor on his first military position was also called Örbom.

He took part in the campaign at Humlebäck on Zealand, a Danish island where Copenhagen is located, in 1700. On 7 July 1701 he left camp, and on 9 July 1701 he crossed the Düna River in Riga in Ukraine. There they conquered the Saxony troops and took about 700 prisoners. He fought in the Battle of Klissow on 7 July 1702, and the Battle of Pułtusk on 21 April 1703. He participated in the Battle of Reusch-Lemberg in 1704, and the Battle of Fraustadt on 3 February 1706, and was promoted to lieutenant with Jämtland Ranger Regiment. He participated, on 4 July 1708, in the Battle of Holowczyn. He was wounded with a bullet to the face. The bullet remained lodged in his skull the remainder of his life. He also participated in the Battle of Lakowitz.

=== Capture ===
He was captured on the Dnieper River in Ukraine on 1 July 1709, and was taken to Siberia as a prisoner-of-war along with other officers during the Surrender at Perevolochna. All the soldiers were executed, and the officers were imprisoned in Siberia. He married Anna Elisabeth Von Rohr (1701–1744) on 5 September 1719 in Solikamsk, Siberia, Russia. Anna's father was Joakim von Rohr, Lieutenant Colonel and Commander of Dalarö fortress, the military fortress east of Stockholm, on the Baltic. Her mother was Katarina Charlotta Klingenberg. Together Anders and Elisabeth had their first child in Siberia:

- Anders Örbom II (1720–1783), who was a captain in the Swedish Army, married Christina Ruuth (1727–1781).

=== Return from Siberia ===
Anders returned home to Sweden in 1721 or 1722 after 13 years of imprisonment. He was promoted to cavalry captain with Jämtland's cavalry company, and in 1727 became squadron chief. He lived in Brunflo and later Rödön. He had the following additional children:

- Carl Joachim Örbom (1722–1810) a captain of the Swedish Army who married Beata Dorothea von Saltza (1721–1764)
- Erik Johan Örbom (1723–1802) a major in the Jämtland Regiment who married Helena Ruuth (1729–1802). One son assumed the name Ruuth instead of Örbom and still has descendants with that name.
- Anna Catharina Örbom (1725-1784) married 1st to Nils Oldenberg, 2nd to Karl Bange, 1717-1784
- Gustaf Örbom I (1728–1730)
- Charlotta Örbom (1730-1755)
- Gustaf Örbom II (1732–1807) a captain in the Swedish Army who married Sophia Lovisa Winnberg (1744–1807)
- Christopher Örbom (1735–1828) a captain in the Swedish Army who married Eva Maria Strandqvist (1776-1863)
- Sara Elisabeth Örbom (1736-1814) married Karl Henrik Lemberg (1745-1809)
- Petrus Örbom (1738-?) a lieutenant in the Swedish Army

== Death ==
Captain Anders Örbom died on 25 May 1740 and was buried in Rödön, Sweden on 5 June 1740.

== See also ==
- Johan Cronman
