= David Makeléer =

Swedish politician (1646–1708)

Baron David Makeléer of Gasevadholm
- Born: 1646; Sweden
- Died: 10 November 1708 (aged 62); Sweden
- Title: Governor of Älvsborg County, Sweden
- Term: 1693-1708
- Spouse: Countess Eleonora Elisabet von Ascheberg (m. 1679–1708)
- Children: Rutger Macklier
- Parent(s): John Hans Makeléer; Anna Gubbertz
- Relatives: Baron Rutger Macklean, grandson Hector Og Maclean, 15th Chief, grandfather

David Makeléer (1646 – 10 November 1708) sometimes written as David Macklier, was the Governor of Älvsborg County, Sweden. He served from 1693 to 1708.

== Biography ==
David was the son of John Hans Makeléer (1604-1666). His mother was Anna Gubbertz (c.1595-1653) sometimes referred to as Anna Quickelberg. Anna was the daughter of Hans Gubbertz (c1570-?) and Maichen Maria von Quickelberg (1582-1646). David Makeléer had the following siblings: Carl Leonard Makeléer (1633-1663); Catharina Makeléer (1637-1709); Anna Makeléer (1638-1646); Lunetta Makeléer (1639-1693) who married Joakim Cronman (c1630-1703), a soldier who died at Neumünde; Gustaf Adolf Makeléer (1641-1706) who was a captain in the Swedish Army who married Sara Carlberg (1647-1701); and Elsa Beata Makeléer (1643-1730). He married Eleonora Elisabet von Ascheberg (1663-1737) in 1679, she was the daughter of Field Marshal Rutger von Ascheberg, Count of Söfdeborg. David then served as the first governor of Älvsborg County, Sweden from 1693 to 1708.

== Children ==
- Friherre Rutger Macklier (1688-1748) who married baroness Vilhelmina Eleonora Coyet and had as their sons, baron David Macklean, and Friherre Rutger Macklean.
- Count John Adolphus Maclean was general in the army and colonel of the king's life guards.

== Ancestors ==
David Makeléer's ancestors in three generations
David Makeléer, 1st Friherre	Father: Sir John Maclean, 1st Baronet	Paternal Grandfather: Hector Og Maclean, 15th Clan Chief	Paternal Great-Grandfather: Sir Lachlan Mor Maclean, 14th Clan Chief
David Makeléer, 1st Friherre	Father: Sir John Maclean, 1st Baronet	Paternal Grandfather: Hector Og Maclean, 15th Clan Chief	Paternal Great-grandmother: Lady Margaret, daughter of William Cunningham, 6th Earl of Glencairn
David Makeléer, 1st Friherre	Father: Sir John Maclean, 1st Baronet	Paternal Grandmother: Isabella Atcheson of Gosford	Paternal Great-Grandfather: Sir Archibald Acheson, 1st Baronet
David Makeléer, 1st Friherre	Father: Sir John Maclean, 1st Baronet	Paternal Grandmother: Isabella Atcheson of Gosford	Paternal Great-Grandmother:
David Makeléer, 1st Friherre	Mother: Anna Gubbertz	Maternal Grandfather: Hans Gubbertz (c1570-?)	Maternal Great-Grandfather: Paul Gubbertz (1553-1623)
David Makeléer, 1st Friherre	Mother: Anna Gubbertz	Maternal Grandfather: Hans Gubbertz (c1570-?)	Maternal Great-Grandmother:
David Makeléer, 1st Friherre	Mother: Anna Gubbertz	Maternal Grandmother: Maria von Quickelberg (1582-1646)	Maternal Great-grandfather: Lucas von Quickelberg (1562-1602)
David Makeléer, 1st Friherre	Mother: Anna Gubbertz	Maternal Grandmother: Maria von Quickelberg (1582-1646)	Maternal Great-Grandmother: Catarina Boij
