= Rutger Maclean =

Rutger Maclean may refer to:

- Rutger Macklier (1688–1748), officer of Charles XII of Sweden
- Rutger Macklean (1742–1816), Swedish land reformer
