= Orbom =

Örbom or Orbom is a Swedish family name that is carried by a number of different families. The oldest and most widely spread of them is the one from the province Jämtland, descended from Captain Anders Örbom, see below. Some people with the name in Sweden may spell it Öhrbom. Orbom is a common form when Örboms have emigrated to the US. One branch of this same Swedish Örbom family changed the name to Orbon.

The name may refer to:

- 1) Anders Örbom (1675–1740), Swedish Captain captured at the Battle of Poltava.
- 2) Anders Gustaf Örbom (1753-1794), Swedish vicar and author. Grandson of (1), 4th great-grandfather of (4).
- 3) Carl Gustaf Axel Örbom (1836–1889), Swedish Minister of Justice. Great-great-grandson of (1), second cousin once removed of (2).
- 4) Eric Walter Orbom (1915–1959), Academy Award winner for Best Art Direction for Spartacus. 4th great-grandson of (2).
