= Carl Peter Blom =

Swedish sailor

Captain Carl Peter Blom, Swedish sailor and founder of Smådalarö Gård, was born 1762 in Mefjärd southeast of Dalarö. At the age of six Blom's father died. His Uncle, Carl Gustav Berg, raised him and taught him to be a sailor.

== Career ==
Blom became captain of his own ship and travelled both in the Mediterranean Sea and to America. During some time he was an employee of the Swedish West India Company that ran trade between Stockholm and Gustavia, capital of then Swedish colony Saint Barthélemy. Blom also participated in the Battle of Svensksund during the Russo-Swedish War (1788–1790).

In October 1789 Captain Blom was an appointed an extraordinary assignment by king Gustav III’s right hand, Michael Ankarswärd. He was supposed to hand over 54 Turks, that were saved from Russian captivity, back to Turkey again. Furthermore, he was supposed to deliver “gifts” to the Bey of Tunis. This, in order to avoid Swedish ships being attacked by pirates, who then ravaged the coast of North Africa without resistance. It was a dangerous task, Captain Blom however was a brave man and he accepted the assignment in exchange for a great deal of money. The following years as Captain on a non-governmental trade ship made Carl Peter Blom a very wealthy man.

== Smådalarö Gård ==
In 1802 Captain Blom bought a part of the Tyresö estate, located outside Stockholm, from Countess Brita Bonde. The part that Blom bought for 12 000 Swedish riksdaler banco, consisted of; Smådalarö, Västertorp, Gränö, Gåsö and Kymmendö, all located in the Stockholm archipelago. Kymmendö was also later portrayed as Hemsö, in August Strindberg ’s “Natives of Hemsö”.

In 1809 Blom built the mansion Smådalarö gård which celebrates 200-years anniversary in 2009. Captain Blom was very attached to the island where he was borne, Mefjärd, and therefore built Smådalarö Gård on a strategic spot from where he could see his childhood home. First the stone house had two floors, but as he still could not see Mjöfjärd, he added a third floor. By 1810 the house was finished. Captain Blom himself did not live in the stone house. In the house he instead held parties and dinners for his guests. Today, the house is the main building of the estate and hotel that Smådalarö Gård has become.

Blom lived in a smaller building nearby, that does not exist today. He preferred to live his life alone and when he died from heart seizure in 1818, he had no children of his own. Due to this, his nephew, Anders Berg, inherited the estate. Berg had been in love with a maid at the estate, Anna Sofia, for a long time. Captain Blom’s opinion was that Berg deserved a “better” wife, and therefore had Anna Sofia sent away with boat to another part of the archipelago. This had caused great disputes between Blom and his nephew, and as the story goes, this was what caused the seizure. Still, after Blom's death, Berg took the opportunity of marrying Anna Sofia. They lived happily until Anders died in 1835. His widow managed the estate 25 further years.

== Other activities ==
- Captain Blom also established the Dalarö dairy farm in 1810.
- His properties had a post office, a commodity centre and a telegraph, quite modern attributes for such a small society.
