= Rohr (surname) =

Rohr is a surname. Notable people with the surname include:

== Military ==
- Franz Freiherr Rohr von Denta (1854-1927), last commander of the Austro-Hungarian First Army
- Davis C. Rohr (1929– ), Major General in the US Air Force

== Sports ==
- Alain Rohr (born 1971), Swiss hurdler
- Bernd Rohr (1937-2022), German cyclist
- Billy Rohr (born 1945), baseball player
- Gernot Rohr (born 1953), German football player and manager
- Jean-Philippe Rohr (born 1961), French footballer
- Les Rohr (1946–2020), baseball player
- Maximilian Rohr (born 1995), German footballer
- Nadine Rohr (born 1977), Swiss pole vaulter
- Oskar Rohr (1912–1988), German footballer

== Other ==
- George Rohr (born 1954), American businessman and philanthropist
- Jim Rohr CEO of PNC Financial Services
- John Rohr (1934–2011), political science professor at Virginia Tech
- Moritz von Rohr (1868-1940) optical scientist at Carl Zeiss in Jena
- Richard Rohr (born 1943) Franciscan priest
- Sami Rohr (1926-2012), American real estate developer and philanthropist
- Suzanne Rohr (born 1939), Swiss watch enameller
- Tony Rohr, British-German actor

== See also ==
- Röhr (surname)
