= Sir John Maclean, 1st Baronet =

Scottish-Swedish noble (1604 – 7 July 1666)

Hans Makeléer, 1st Baronet
- Born: John MacLean; 1604; Duart, Scotland
- Died: 7 July 1666 (aged 62); Gothenburg, Sweden
- Other names: John MacLean, 1st Baronet; Iain dubh Macleare; Hans Macklier; Johan Macklier; John Macleir; John the Black Maclean
- Occupations: Scottish Naval Officer; Merchant in Gothenburg, Sweden
- Title: Lord of Gåsevadholm, Hageby, and Hammarö; Iain Dubh Baronet
- Successor: Johan Makeléer, 2nd Baronet
- Spouse: Anna Gubbertz or Anna Quickelberry
- Children: Johan Makeléer, 2nd Baronet; David Makeléer, 1st Friherre
- Parent: Hector Og Maclean, 15th Clan Chief
- Relatives: Joakim Cronman, son-in-law

Sir John Maclean, 1st Baronet, (1604 – 7 July 1666) also known as John Makeléer or Hans Makeléer in Sweden, was Lord of Gåsevadholm, Hageby and Hammarö. He lived in Gothenburg, Sweden. He was made a Baronet by Charles II of England and was made Lord of Gåsevadholm, Hageby, and Hammarö by Christina of Sweden in 1649.

== Biography ==
John was born in 1604 at Duart Castle, Mull, Argyll, Scotland. He was the son of Hector Og Maclean, 15th Clan Chief and Isabella Atcheson of Gosford, daughter of Sir Archibald Acheson, 1st Baronet. His full brother was Donald MacLean, 1st Laird of Brolas. Isabella was the daughter of Sir Archibald Acheson, 1st Baronet. John MacLean then became an officer in the Royal Navy.

== Emigration and marriage ==
He emigrated to Gothenburg, Sweden in 1620, where he had an uncle who worked as a merchant. Now known as John Makeléer or Hans Makeléer, he worked as a merchant, and married Anna Gubbertz (c.1595–1653) or Anna Quickelberry in 1629 in Gothenburg. Anna's sister was married to one of John's relatives, Jacob Makeléer (Jacob Macklier). He was named a town councilor in 1640 and remained one through 1650. In 1644, he commanded a Swedish yacht during a failed Norwegian crossing to Lärjeholm during the Torstenson War.

== Children ==
John Hans Makeléer and Anna had fifteen children, with ten surviving to adulthood. They were:

1. Charles Makeléer who died young.
2. Jacob Makeléer (1632–1663) was in the service of Charles XI of Sweden in England. He married Catherine Cochrane, the daughter of Colonel John Cochrane (colonel). Jacob may have taken his own life during an illness.
3. Johan Makeléer, 2nd Baronet (1636–1696), of the Gothenburg Court of Justice. He married Anna Margareta Gordon.
4. Peter Makeléer was colonel and commandant in Stralsund, and he married Abolla Sophia Vanplassen.
5. Gustavus Makeléer was colonel in the Swedish army and commandant in Gothenburg.
6. Carl Leonard Makeléer (1633–1663)
7. Maria Makeléer who married General David Duncan (general). He was in the service of the King of Denmark.
8. Catharina Makeléer (1637–1709) who married, first, Colonel David Sinclair (colonel), and secondly, General Baron Malcolm Hamilton of Hageby.
9. Eliza Makeléer, she was married to Major Cailenkerheilm.
10. Anna Makeléer (1638–1646).
11. Lunetta Makeléer (1639–1693) who married Joakim Cronman (c.1640–1703). He was a Colonel in the service of the Swedish Empire and the Commandant at Neumünde. This is the Ruuth-Näslund-Winblad line.
12. Maria Sophia Makeléer (1640–1721).
13. Gustaf Adolf Makeléer (1641–1706) who was a Captain in the Swedish Army who married Sara Carlberg (1647–1701).
14. Elsa Beata Makeléer (1643–1730) who married Major Marten Christensson.
15. David Makeléer, 1st Friherre (1645–1708), a General in the army and the first governor of Älvsborg County, Sweden from 1693 to 1708 who married the countess of Arenberg. General David left five sons and two daughters, of whom John Aldolphus MacLean was general in the army and colonel of the Life Guards.

== Baronet ==
In 1635 he loaned 1,150 thalers to Queen Christina of Sweden to supply her army at a time when the Royal treasury was depleted. In May 1649 he was awarded a Baronetcy by Charles II of England.

On 30 December 1655 he married Lilian Hamilton. After her death he married Anna Thompson. He died in 1666.

Hans Makeléer ancestors

John Hans Makeléer's ancestors in three generations
John Hans Makeléer	Father: Hector Og Maclean, 15th Clan Chief	Paternal Grandfather: Sir Lachlan Mor Maclean	Paternal Great-Grandfather: Eachuinn Og Maclean
John Hans Makeléer	Father: Hector Og Maclean, 15th Clan Chief	Paternal Grandfather: Sir Lachlan Mor Maclean	Paternal Great-grandmother: Janet, daughter of Archibald Campbell, 4th Earl of Argyll
John Hans Makeléer	Father: Hector Og Maclean, 15th Clan Chief	Paternal Grandmother: Margaret Cunningham of Glencairn	Paternal Great-Grandfather: William Cunningham, 6th Earl of Glencairn
John Hans Makeléer	Father: Hector Og Maclean, 15th Clan Chief	Paternal Grandmother: Margaret Cunningham of Glencairn	Paternal Great-Grandmother: Janet, daughter of Sir John Gordon of Lochinvar
John Hans Makeléer	Mother: Isabella Acheson of Gosford	Maternal Grandfather: Sir Archibald Acheson, 1st Baronet	Maternal Great-Grandfather: Captain Patrick Acheson
John Hans Makeléer	Mother: Isabella Acheson of Gosford	Maternal Grandfather: Sir Archibald Acheson, 1st Baronet	Maternal Great-Grandmother: Martha Drummond
John Hans Makeléer	Mother: Isabella Acheson of Gosford	Maternal Grandmother: Agnes Vernor or Margaret Hamilton	Maternal Great-grandfather:
John Hans Makeléer	Mother: Isabella Acheson of Gosford	Maternal Grandmother: Agnes Vernor or Margaret Hamilton	Maternal Great-Grandmother:

== Works cited ==
- Fröding, Hugo [in Swedish] (1908). Berättelser ur Göteborgs äldsta historia [Stories from Gothenburg's Earliest History] (in Swedish). Gothenburg: Wald. Zachrissons förlag.

== See also ==
- Anders Örbom
- Joachim von Rohr
