= Sövdeborg Castle =

Castle in Scania, Sweden

- Sövdeborgs slott
- Sjöbo Municipality
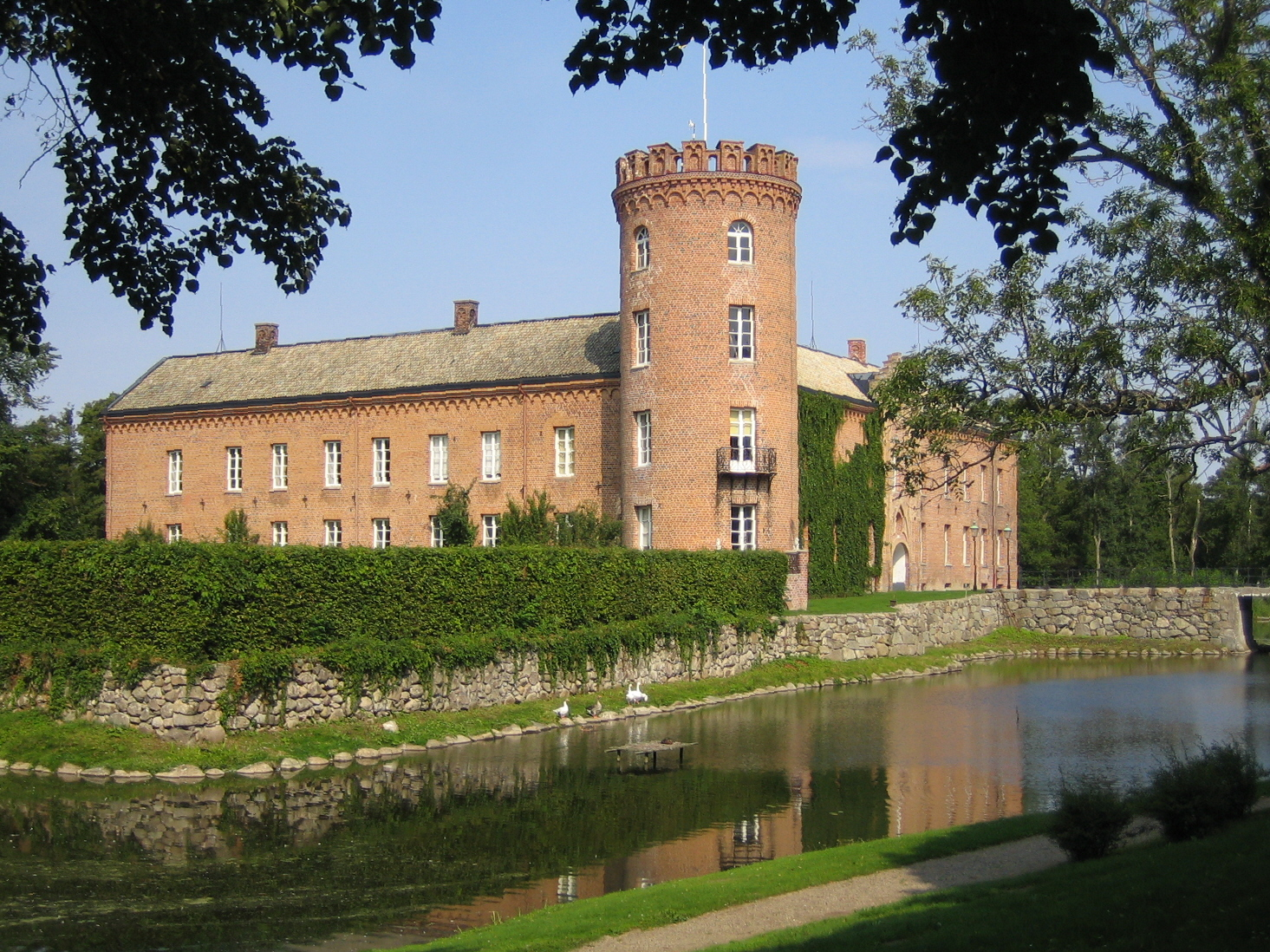
- Sövdeborg Castle

Site information
- Type: Castle
- Open to the public: By appointment

Location
- Scania, Sweden
- Location within Skåne
- Coordinates: 55.581944°N 13.696944°E

Site history
- Built: 1597; 429 years ago

Sövdeborg Castle (Swedish: Sövdeborgs slott) is a castle in Sjöbo Municipality, Scania, in southern Sweden. Out of approximately 200 castles in Scania, this is one of about 25 which allows public visitors. The inside of the castle is decorated with stuccos and an oak ceiling carved in cartilage baroque.

== History ==
Frederik Lange acquired the estate from the crown in 1587 and in 1597, he erected a castle. After he died in 1614, his son sold the castle to Danish nobleman Tage Ottesen Thott (1580–1658). His son Otte Thagesen Thott (1607-1656) completed the building plans and rebuilding the castle into a Renaissance castle in 1642.

In 1676, Thott sold it to Swedish Governor General Rutger von Ascheberg (1621–1693). The estate was owned by the Ascheberg family until 1735 when Johan August Meijerfeldt (1664–1749) bought it. In 1788, it was purchased by Swedish Count Carl Gustaf Piper (1737-1803). Lieutenant Erik Carl Piper (1807-1849) became the owner of the castle in 1833. In the 1840s, he hired architect Carl Georg Brunius (1792-1869) and under his leadership a thorough restoration of the castle took place.
