= Smådalarö Gård =

Building in Haninge Municipality, Stockholm County, Sweden

Coordinates: 59°10′01″N 18°27′22″E

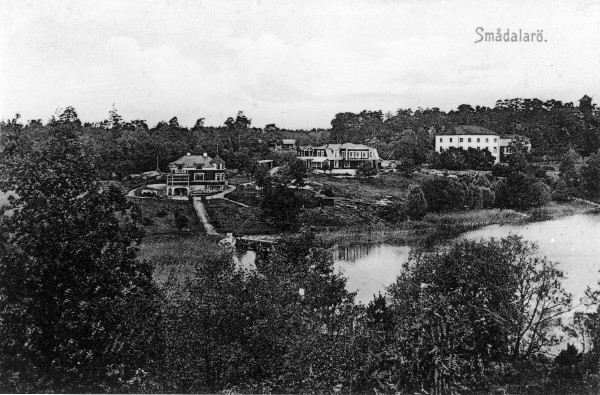
Smådalarö gård

Smådalarö Gård is an inn located at Dalarö in Stockholm archipelago, located in Haninge Municipality, Stockholm County, Sweden. The manor house was originally built in 1810 by Captain Carl Peter Blom, and today the original stone house has been complemented with a hotel wing.

== Golf course ==
Smådalarö Gård features a 9-hole golf course designed by Bengt Lorichs, inaugurated in 2001, the same year it was admitted as an associate member of the Swedish Golf Federation.

The course hosted the Smådalarö Gård Open on the women's Swedish Golf Tour for eight years 2005–2012, where winners included Johanna Johansson.
