= Röhr =

Röhr may refer to:

- Röhr (river), a river in Germany
- Röhr (surname), a surname of German origin
