= Caroli Church, Malmö =

Coordinates: 55°36′27″N 13°00′24″E

Caroli Church
- Caroli kyrka
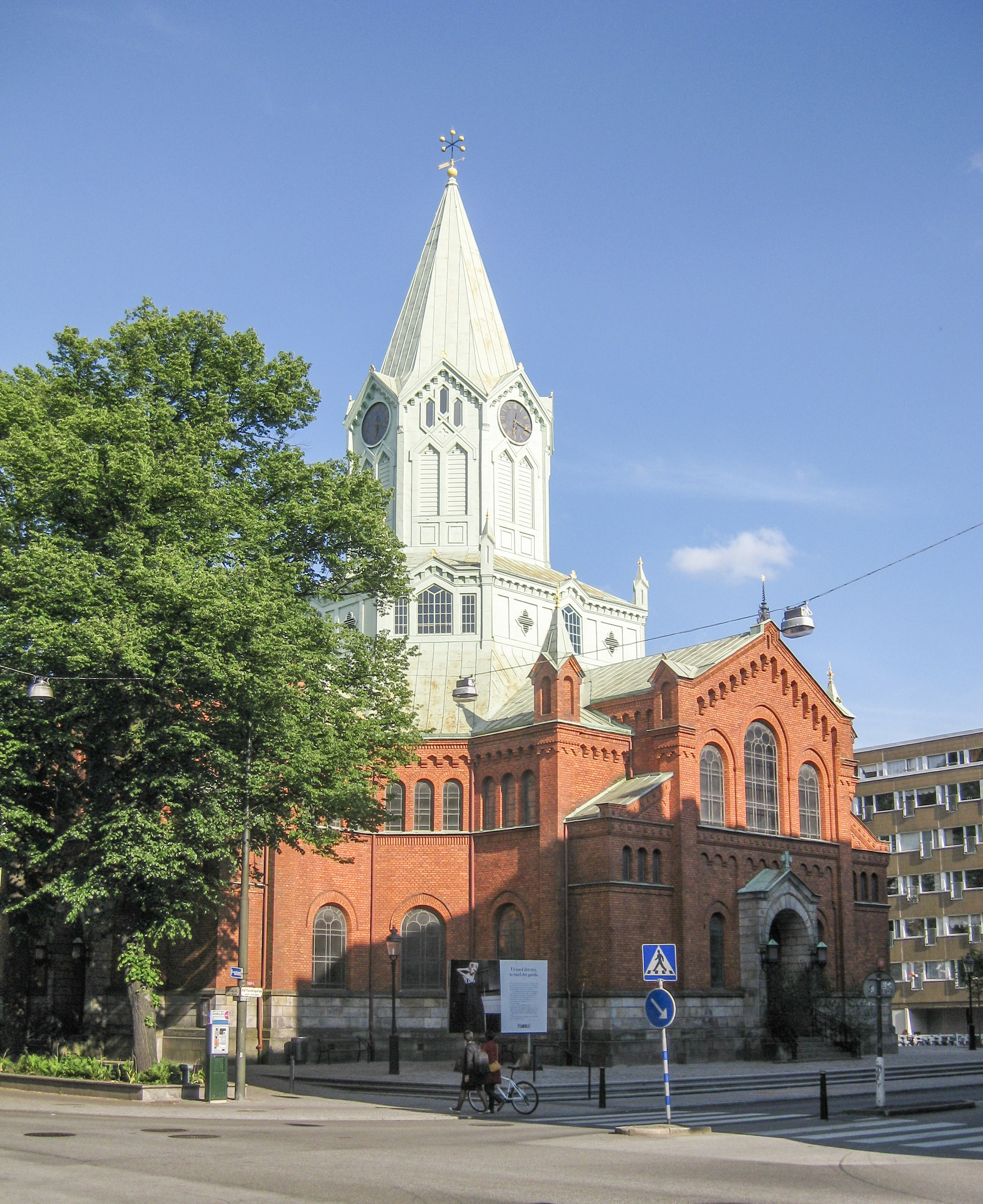
- former Caroli Church in June 2012
- Caroli Church
- Location: Malmö
- Country: Sweden
- Denomination: Church of Sweden

History
- Consecrated: 19 December 1880

Architecture
- Architect: Emil Viktor Langlet

Administration
- Diocese: Lund
- Parish: Saint Peter

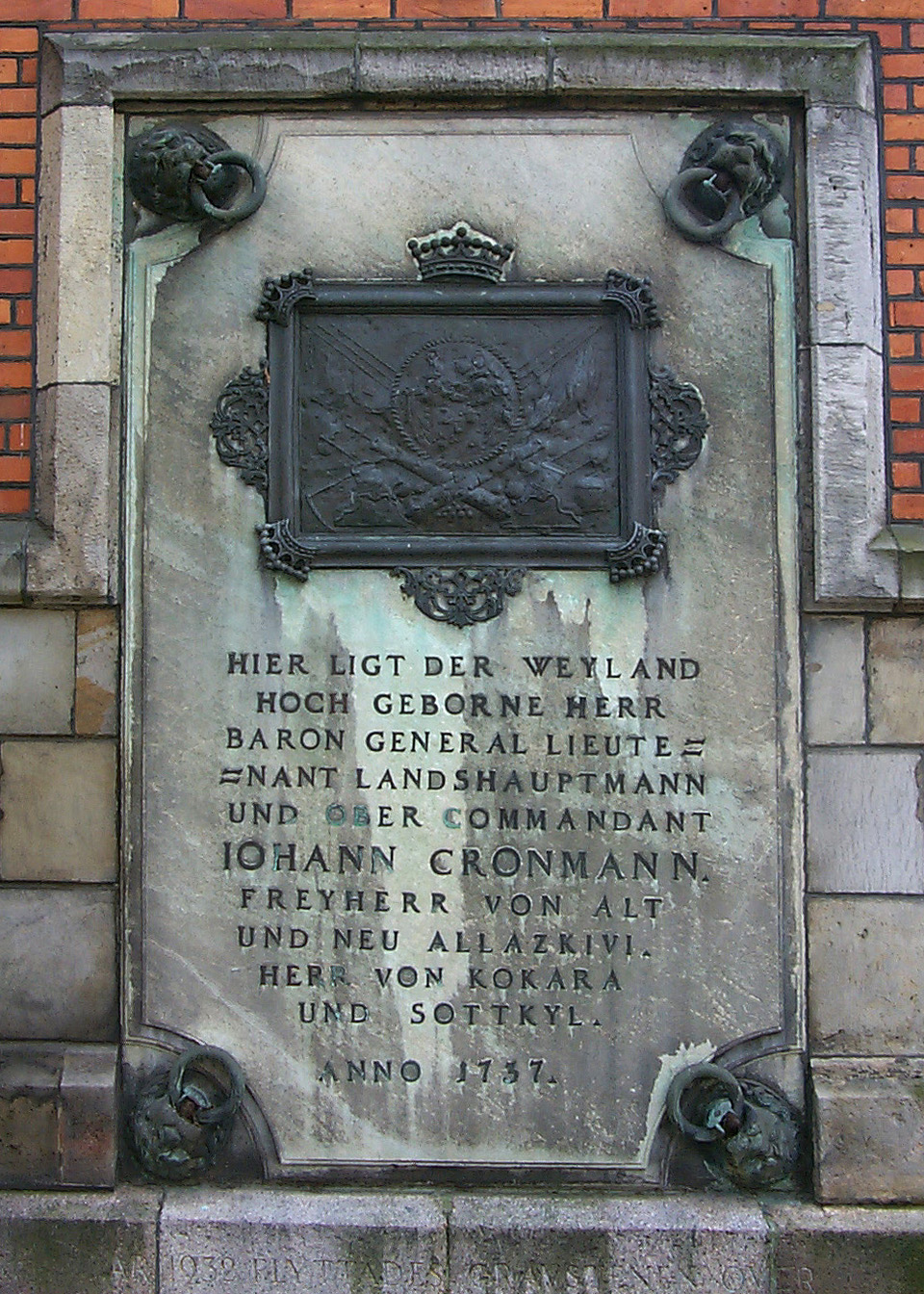
Plaque for Johan Cronman at Caroli Church.

Caroli Church is a Christian church in Malmö, Sweden. It was built in 1880. The church is named after king Charles XI of Sweden.

The first Caroli Church was built in 1680, in the same place as the current building. The church was also known as "The German Church" and the services was held in the German language for the German merchants and craftsmen of Malmö.

It was deconsecrated in 2010. However, Caroli Church is reopening as C3 Church Malmö in January 2027, offering services in the English language.
