= Crossing attempt at Lärjeholm =

Part of the Torstenson War

- Part of the Torstenson War
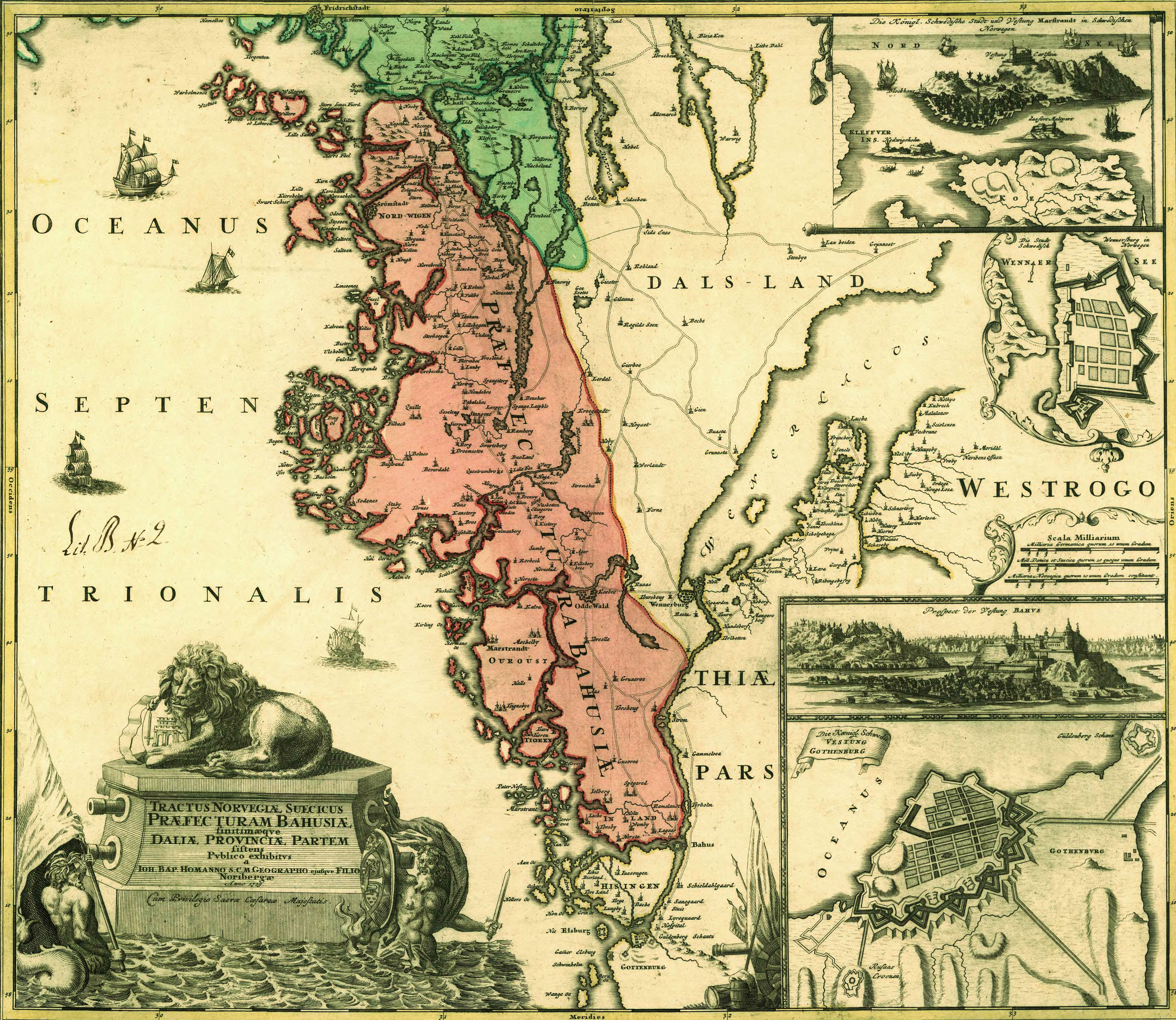
- Map of Bohuslän and its surrounding areas by Johann Homann, published posthumously in 1729.
Date	29 or 30 June – 1 July 1644
Location	Lärjeholm, Sweden 57.760925°N 12.006320°E
Result	Swedish victory

Belligerents
(yes) Swedish Empire	Denmark–Norway

Commanders and leaders
(yes) Johan Chrysostomus Gordon (yes) Hans Macklier	Unknown

Strength
200–250 men 3–4 boats 6–7 guns	Unknown number of men 2 guns

Casualties and losses
2 killed Several wounded (Note: Sources disagree on the exact number of Swedish wounded. Swedish historian Vilhelm Vessberg notes "some wounded", while a contemporary letter from Hans Macklier states that 18 were wounded.)	30–40 casualties 7 boats captured

The crossing attempt at Lärjeholm occurred from 29/30 June to 1 July 1644 during the Torstenson War, fought between Denmark and Sweden.

On 29 or 30 June, Danish troops began construction of a bridge across the Göta älv, from Lärjeholm to Hospitalet. Their intention was to cross the river and then link up with 1,100 men commanded by Iver Krabbe. However, the attempted crossing was noticed by Johan Chrysostomus Gordon, who led 200–250 men to oppose it. A firefight broke out between both sides, soon after which Gordon dispatched three or four armed vessels to bombard the Danes. The Danes suffered heavy casualties and promptly abandoned the crossing.

== Background ==
On 13 December 1643, after months of preparation by Axel Oxenstierna, a Swedish army of 16,000 men invaded Holstein under the command of Lennart Torstensson. The invasion sparked the eponymous Torstenson War between Denmark and Sweden.

=== Prelude ===
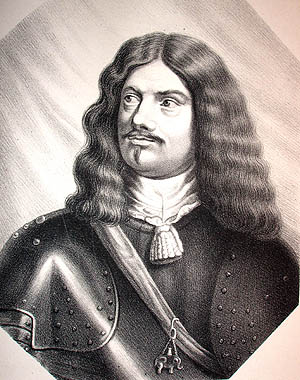
Portrait of Hannibal Sehested by Jens Peter Trap

In June of 1644, a force led by Hannibal Sehested crossed into Sweden, heading for Vänersborg. The town fell to Sehested on 19 June, as its defenses had been badly managed. Vänersborg was subsequently burned down by Sehested's forces, who withdrew to Uddevalla and Lilla Edet.

Following the destruction of Vänersborg, the Danes began constructing a bridge between Hisingen and Skårdal, to cross the Göta älv and link up with 1,100 men from Varberg led by Iver Krabbe, and extract tribute from the peasantry in the countryside.

== Crossing ==
On either 29 or 30 June, the Danes moved the bridge down the river, between Lärjeholm and Hospitalet. However, it had to be extended as it was too short. As the Swedes noticed the crossing attempt, Johan Chrysostomus Gordon led 200 to 250 men to prevent it. He positioned them near Hospitalet opposing the Danish position. Meanwhile, the Danes took up position inside a house and stationed two guns beside the bridge. When Gordon fired on the Danes, they "dropped both their spades and their provisions", and several Danes were killed.

With the Danes now firing on the Swedes from the houses in Färjestaden, including from the bridge, the Swedes sent out three armed vessels. These included a yacht (Note: Historian Vilhelm Vessberg instead refers to the yacht as simply a "small armed vessel".) armed with four guns, led by Hans Macklier, a ship's boat with one or two guns, (Note: According to Vilhelm Vessberg, who mentions the ship's boat directly, it was equipped with two guns. However, according to Hugo Fröding, each vessel except for the yacht only had one gun.) and a barge armed with one gun. A contemporary account from Macklier also claimed a Dutch sloop participated in the fighting. The vessels also had several musketeers on board. The fire from the vessels caused heavy Danish casualties. The Danes proceeded to abandon and destroy the bridge and flee, throwing a gun from the bridge into the river while doing so. The fighting lasted from 6 p.m. to 4 a.m.

== Aftermath ==
Entering the ferry house, the Swedes discovered 25 Danes who had died in the fighting. The ferry house was subsequently burned down and by then (1 July) the Danes brought away five boats filled with those killed.

During the fighting, the Danes suffered 30–40 casualties in total and seven boats were seized by the Swedes. By comparison, the Swedes suffered two killed. However, the number of Swedish wounded is disputed. According to Vessberg, the Swedes suffered "some wounded", while Macklier claimed that 18 were wounded in total.

The following day, another crossing attempt was made at Steke, though it also ended in failure.
