= Margareta von Ascheberg =

Swedish countess, landowner, and acting regiment colonel

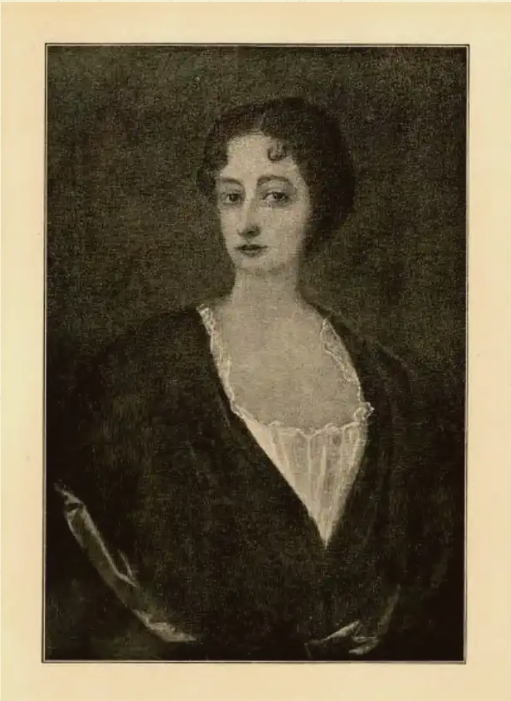
- Born: 9 July 1671
- Died: 26 October 1753 (aged 82)
- Spouse(s): Kjell Christopher Barnekow (m. 1691–1700; his death)
- Children: 5
- Parent(s): Rutger von Ascheberg; Maria Eleonora von Busseck

Margareta von Ascheberg (9 July 1671 – 26 October 1753) was a Swedish countess, landowner, and acting regiment colonel during the Great Northern War.

== Early life and marriage ==
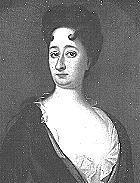
Another portrait of Margareta von Ascheberg.

Margareta von Ascheberg was the youngest named child of Field Marshal Rutger von Ascheberg and Maria Eleonora von Busseck. She had 24 siblings, but only nine of them lived to adulthood.

On 26 January 1691, the 19-year-old Margareta von Ascheberg married the 27-year-old Colonel Kjell Christopher Barnekow (13 December 1663 – 19 December 1700), a fellow count, in Malmö. As was the custom of many Swedish noblewomen of that time, she kept her surname after marriage, styling herself as Grevinnan Ascheberg (Countess Ascheberg). Like her mother, Margareta was constantly pregnant during her marriage; after suffering several miscarriages, she gave birth to five children in just six years, one of whom died in infancy. She frequently accompanied her spouse on his military commissions, giving birth to their second son during the Bombardment of Brussels in 1695.

At the outbreak of the Great Northern War, Kjell Christopher Barnekow was called to Sweden and appointed colonel of the Scanian dragoons, which he undertook to equip himself. However, he died very suddenly and unexpectedly of a fever on 19 December 1700, before he had the time to accomplish this task.

== Madam Colonel ==
As a 29-year-old widow, Margareta von Ascheberg was left with the responsibility of her four minor children and the management of their estates, as well as the other responsibilities of her late spouse. This included the task of the command and equipment of his Scanian regiment. She was not freed from this responsibility, and the acting colonel Kr. A. v. Buchwaldt was appointed to see that she fulfilled her task. In the spring of 1702, she had performed the task of a colonel by having organized and equipped the regiment and appointed its officers ready for inspection by the royal command and ready to serve in the war. She also sat at the inspection office of the regiment when it was sent to war from Kristianstad.

During the war, she took care of the continued equipment and affairs of the regiment and exchanged letters with Charles XII of Sweden about its appointments and promotions. She was called "Coloneless" or Madam Colonel. She was admired for "the energy and care, with which she performed her unusual task, a circumstance, which in other cases would seem impossible for a woman".

== Estate management ==
Margareta von Ascheberg was also given the responsibility of the estates of her spouse, including Vittskövle, Rosendal and Örtofta in Scania, Gammel-Kjöge on Zealand, Ralsvik and Streu on Rügen, and she also added the estate of Ugerup in Scania to it. She herself inherited and acquired the additional estates of Eliinge, Sövdeborg and Tosterup.

She was a very successful businessperson and landowner who was recommended for her efficiency. She founded schools, hospitals and gave anonymous donations to the poor in the parishes of her estates, and in contrast to other contemporary landowners, such as the hated Christina Piper, she managed to make herself popular among her employees. She was called "a true mother of the household" and was admired for her "unusual accomplishment, which should not be interpreted dishonestly, as the whole of Scania can testify for it to be truthful". In the parish of Vittskövle, where she preferred to reside, "the Ascheberg woman" became a respected figure of folklore.

== See also ==
- Maria Sofia De la Gardie
