= Rutger von Ascheberg =

Soldier, officer and civil servant in Swedish service

Count Rutger von Ascheberg
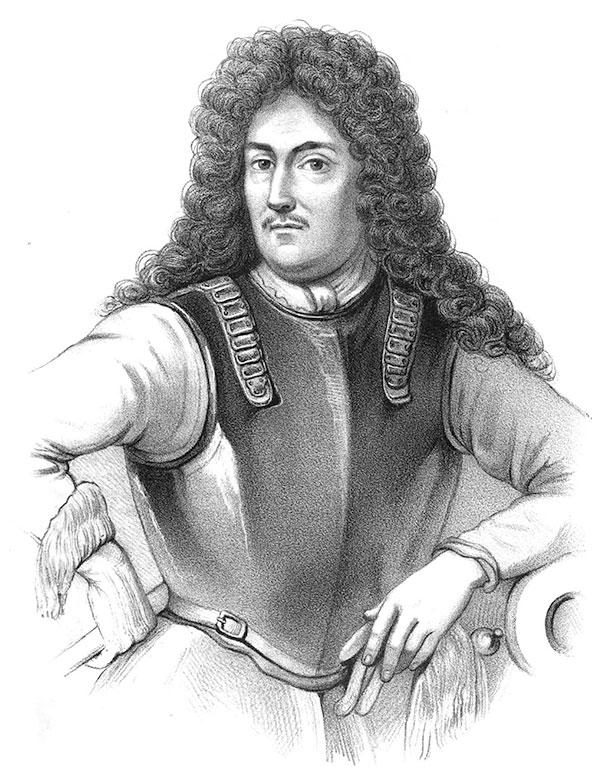

Governor-General of Gothenburg and Bohus and Dalsland
- In office 1679–1693

Governor-General of Scania, Halland and Blekinge
- In office 1680–1680
- Preceded by: Johan Gyllenstierna
- Succeeded by: None — office abolished

Governor-General of Scania and Halland
- In office 1680–1693
- Preceded by: None
- Succeeded by: Otto Vellingk (Scania only)

Personal details
- Born: 2 June 1621 Berbonen (Perbohnen), Duchy of Courland
- Died: 17 April 1693 (aged 71) Gothenburg, Sweden
- Spouse: Maria Eleonora von Bussech
- Children: 25, including Margareta von Ascheberg

Count Rutger von Ascheberg (2 June 1621 – 17 April 1693), also known as Roger von Ascheberg, was a Swedish soldier born in Courland, an officer and civil servant who served as Lieutenant General in 1670, General in 1674, Field Marshal in 1678, Governor General of the Swedish Scanian provinces in 1680, and became a Royal Councilor in 1681. He is also remembered for his exceptionally large number of children with his wife Maria Eleonora von Busseck, a noted beauty.

== Biography ==
Ascheberg was born on the estate Berbonen (Perbohnen) in Courland (today part of Latvia) on 2 June 1621. He was of an old Westphalian family that had emigrated to Courland in the 16th century. His parents were Wilhelm von Ascheberg and Margaretha von der Osten.

=== Thirty Years' War ===
At the age of 13, he served as a page for Colonel Brink of the Swedish army, who was fighting in the Thirty Years' War in Germany. He was present at a number of major battles, including the Battle of Nördlingen in 1634.

In 1639, he left the army for studies in France. At the age of 19, he was drafted into a Hessian cavalry regiment in Swedish service. He distinguished himself at the Battle of Wolfenbüttel in 1641. In the Battle of Breitenfeld in 1642, he was wounded and captured by the enemy but later rescued. During the remaining part of the Thirty Years' War, Ascheberg fought under Field Marshals Lennart Torstenson and Carl Gustaf Wrangel. He distinguished himself on a number of occasions and was made cornet in 1644, captain lieutenant in 1645 and Rittmeister in 1646.

After the peace was settled in 1648, Ascheberg remained in Germany. He held a position as bailiff from 1651–1655. In 1655, he was offered a position as lieutenant colonel and command of a regiment within the Swedish army, which was preparing for war against the Polish–Lithuanian Commonwealth.

=== Second Northern War (1655–1660) ===
The war, known as the Second Northern War, initially took place in Poland-Lithuania. Ascheberg proved to be successful during the campaign. In March 1656. after capturing the city of Jarosław, Ascheberg was promoted to colonel. In July of the same year, he fought at the Battle of Warsaw. He commanded the Swedish forces in the Battle of Chojnice (Konitz), in which he was highly successful according to some sources. As a token of his appreciation, Swedish king Charles X Gustav gave Ascheberg a rapier he had used in battle. He also received valuable jewellery and an estate in Prussia.

Denmark attacked Sweden's German possessions in 1657; this led to the Swedish army, including the forces under Ascheberg, leaving Poland to instead engage the Danish forces, who were seen as the more immediate threat. In 1658, Ascheberg spearheaded the March across the Belts, a bold maneuver where the army marched across the frozen ice of Little Belt and Great Belt in order to reach the Danish island of Zealand and the capital Copenhagen. He narrowly escaped being caught when the enemy under Frederick William of Brandenburg and Polish commander Stefan Czarniecki attacked Sønderborg in December 1658. In February 1659, he was badly wounded during the assault on Copenhagen. After spending 10 weeks in bed, a recovered Ascheberg returned to the battlefield in time to be in charge of the conquest of the island of Møn in May 1659. He remained on the island until the war ended in 1660.

=== Promotions and knighthood ===
In 1664, Ascheberg was promoted to major general, and in 1665, he took part when Field Marshal Wrangel led Swedish troops to the German city of Bremen during the conflict between Sweden and Bremen. He returned to Sweden when the conflict was settled. In 1670, he reached the rank of lieutenant general, and in 1673, he was declared Freiherr of the estate Kastellgården outside Kungälv. In 1674, he was promoted to general.

=== Scanian War (1675–1679) ===
In the Scanian War, Ascheberg was first responsible for the defence of Bohuslän against attacks from Norway. His force won a battle close to Kviström. He left Bohuslän for Scania and acted as commander in a number of battles, often alongside king Charles XI. He distinguished himself at the Battle of Halmstad in August 1676, where he was wounded in the arm. After recovering in Gothenburg, he joined the army in Scania in time to play a significant part in the largest battle of the war, the Battle of Lund in December. He contributed actively to the Swedish victory in the Battle of Landskrona in 1677, after which he was appointed Lieutenant Field Marshal. Before the war ended, he had received highest command of the Swedish army in Scania. In November 1678, after the hostilities had practically ended but before a peace treaty had been negotiated, Ascheberg was handed the highest position within the Swedish army: Field Marshal.

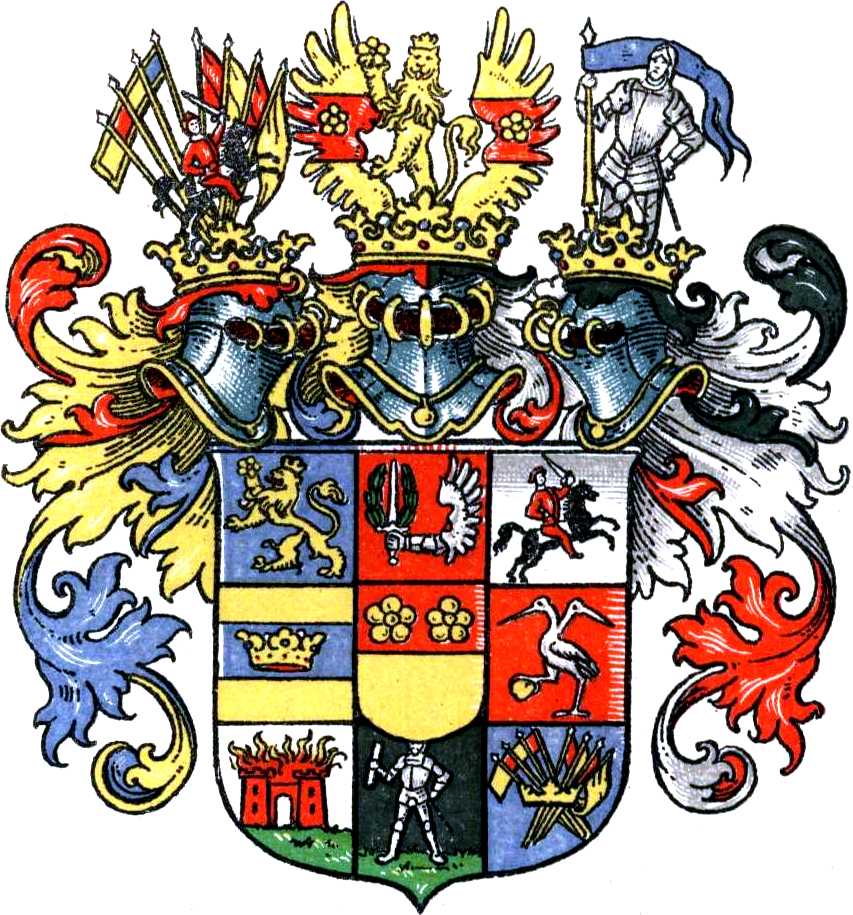
His coat of arms as a Swedish count.

=== Governor-General and Count ===
After the Scanian war had ended in December 1679, Ascheberg was appointed Governor-General of Gothenburg, Bohuslän and Dalsland. In 1680, Scania and Halland was added to his governorship. He was declared Royal Councilor in 1681 and Count in 1687.

=== Mentor to the king ===
King Charles XI, who rose to the throne as a four-year-old when his father king Charles X Gustav died in 1660, saw Ascheberg as his military master. In a letter to Ascheberg, written 1680, Charles XI acknowledged that "...the little that I have learnt in this war, I have got Herr Field Marshal to thank for, and for as long as I live, I will acknowledge that".

=== Death ===
Ascheberg died in Gothenburg on 17 April 1693. He was buried in German Church (Tyska kyrkan), also known as Kristine Church, Gothenburg, on 26 August 1694. King Charles XI attended the funeral.

Among the manors and estates that Ascheberg owned at the time of his death were Kastellegården, Gullmarsberg, Holma, Torreby, Stenungsön and Ström, in Bohuslän, as well as Sövdeborg, Agerup and Tosterup in Scania.

== Marriage and children ==
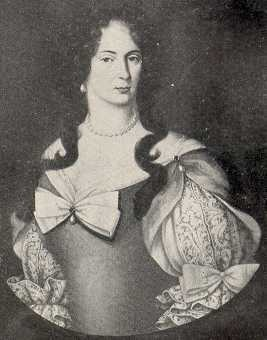
Maria Eleonora von Busseck

In 1650, at the age of twenty-nine, Rutger von Ascheberg married Maria Eleonora von Bussech (1632–1690), an eighteen-year-old girl from a Hessian noble family. She was buried in 1691, in the same church that her husband would be buried in three years later.

Maria Eleonora was constantly pregnant during much of her marriage, giving birth almost once a year. The couple had 25 children in just 26 years, of which only 12 are known by name:

- George Fredrik von Ascheberg (1651 - 1677)
- Margareta Sabina von Ascheberg (1652 - 1738)
- Unnamed daughter who died shortly after birth (1653)
- Ludvig Volrath von Ascheberg (1654 - 1677)
- Unnamed son who died shortly after birth (1655)
- Anna Elisabeth von Ascheberg (1656 - 1686)
- Unnamed son who died shortly after birth (1657)
- Unnamed daughter who died shortly after birth (1658)
- Karl Gustaf von Ascheberg (1659 - 1660), died in infancy
- Rutger von Ascheberg (1660 - 1660), died in infancy
- Gustaf Adolf von Ascheberg (1661 - 1692)
- Kristian Ludvig von Ascheberg (1662 - 1722)
- Eleonora Elisabet von Ascheberg (1663–1737). She was born on 13 September 1663. On 14 September 1679, she married David Makeléer, and she died on 13 November 1737.
- Sofia Lovisa von Ascheberg (1664–1720), who married Hans Wachtmeister
- Otto Vilhelm von Ascheberg (1665–1687)
- Unnamed daughter who died shortly after birth (1667)
- Unnamed daughter who died shortly after birth (1668)
- Unnamed son who died shortly after birth (1669)
- Unnamed son who died shortly after birth (1670)
- Margareta von Ascheberg (1671–1753), who married Kjell Kristoffer Barnekow (1663–1700) on 26 January 1691
- Unnamed daughter who died shortly after birth (1672)
- Stillborn daughter (1673)
- Stillborn daughter (1674)
- Stillborn son (1675)
- Stillborn son (1677)

Unfortunately, most of the children died young; only five of them outlived their parents.

== Legacy ==
A major street (Aschebergsgatan) is named in his honor in the city of Gothenburg.

== See also ==
- List of Swedish military commanders
- List of Swedish wars
- Dominions of Sweden
