= Petr Ivanovich Godunov =

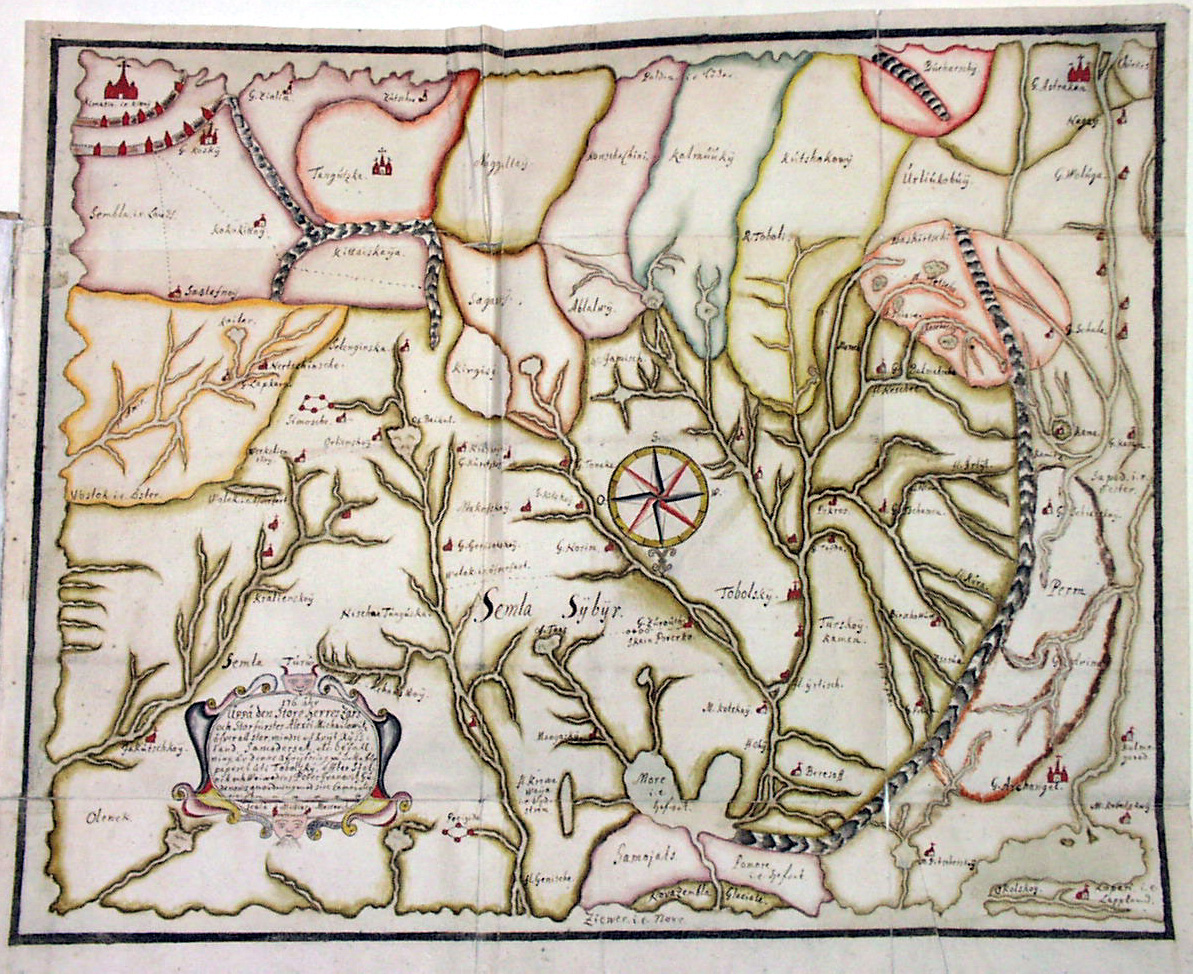
Copy of the Godunov map by Claes Johansson Prytz

Pyotr Ivanovich Godunov (Russian: Петр Иванович Годунов; ? – 1670) was the Governor-General of Western Siberia as the Voevoda in Tobolsk from 1667 until his death in 1670, before which he had been a steward (стольник) in the tsar’s court.

Godunov is best remembered for his eponymous Godunov map, having been commissioned on 15 November 1667 by Tsar Alexis to commence the mapping of Siberia. Although the original map has been lost, there are two extant copies: one made by Claes Johansson Prytz, and the other made by Fritz Cronman. The Godunov map shows all geographical features discovered at the time of its making, provides an outline of the drainage networks of Siberia and of the Russian Far East, and shows the most important cities and of settlements of the indigenous peoples therein.

Godunov also compiled the Gazetteer of the Land of China and Deepest India, containing diverse material on China (principally geographic and ethnologic) and including many chronicles. Later, the Gazetteer was later translated into Modern Greek.

In Siberia, Godunov also promoted agricultural development and the fortification of borders.
