= Godunov map =

1667 ethnographic map of Siberia

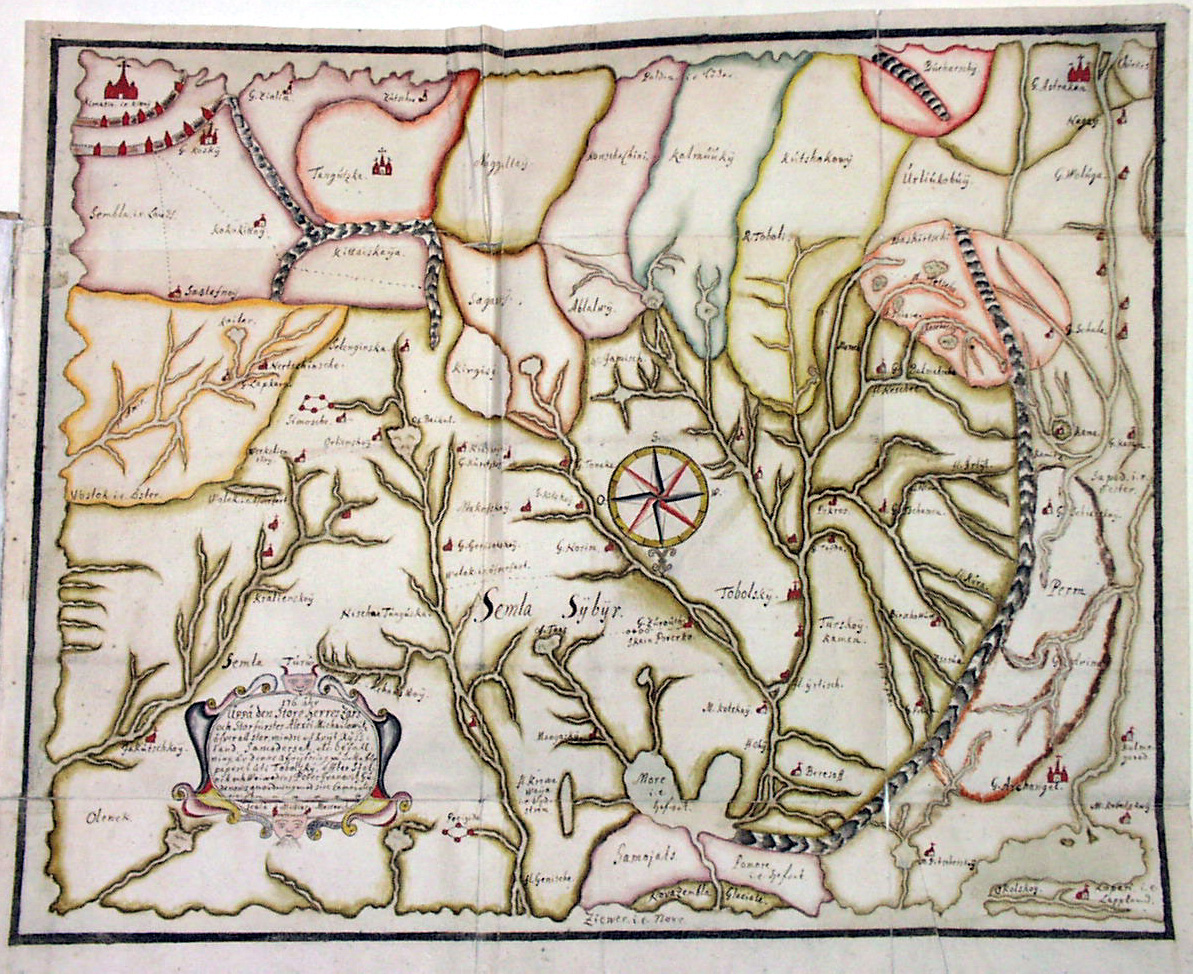
Copy by Claes Johansson Prytz

The Godunov map was an ethnographic map of Siberia commissioned by Alexis of Russia on 15 November 1667. The original is no longer extant, but two copies were made: one by Claes Johansson Prytz and the other by Fritz Cronman. It is named after Petr Ivanovich Godunov, the then governor (voivode) of Tobolsk.
