= Tedreküla =

Village in Estonia

- Village
- Location within Estonia
- Coordinates: 58.681°N 27.155°E
- Country: Estonia
- County: Tartu County
- Parish: Peipsiääre Parish
- Time zone: UTC+2 (EET)
  - Summer (DST): UTC+3 (EEST)

Tedreküla is a village in Peipsiääre Parish, Tartu County in Estonia.

Tedreküla was established on 18 October 2019 on the territory of Pärsikivi village and the southern part of Kodavere village.
