= Pärsikivi =

Village in Estonia

Coordinates: 58°41′N 27°10′E

- Village
- Interactive map of Pärsikivi
- Country: Estonia
- County: Tartu County
- Parish: Peipsiääre Parish
- Time zone: UTC+2 (EET)
  - Summer (DST): UTC+3 (EEST)

Pärsikivi was a village in Peipsiääre Parish, Tartu County in eastern Estonia.

On 18 October 2019 Pärsikivi village was dissolved and a new village Tedreküla was established on the territory of Pärsikivi village and southern part of Kodavere village.
