= Fritz Cronman =

Swedish diplomat (c. 1640 – c. 1680)

- Occupation: Diplomat
- Title: Major
- Parent: Hans Detterman Cronman
- Relatives: Joachim Cronman, brother Johan Cronman, nephew Joachim von Rohr, nephew

Fritz Cronman (c. 1640 - c. 1680) was a Major for the Swedish Empire in the late 17th century, and the Swedish diplomat to the Tsardom of Russia from 1668 to 1669. His extant diary and letters contain detailed information on the court of Ivan V of Russia.

== Biography ==
He was born in Swedish Livonia to Hans Detterman Croman. He participated in the border commission with Russia in Keksholm, but the negotiations ended when the Russian commissioners walked out on the talks. On 26 September 1668 he was appointed as the Swedish diplomat to the Tsardom of Russia under Ivan V of Russia. On 8 October 1668 he sailed to Finland and then traveled overland to Narva. On 10 November 1668 he arrived at the Russian border at Orlina, where he was escorted to Novgorod. In his letter from Novgorod to the Swedish government he writes: "Russians inevitably must be impelled to such unusual höflighetsbetygelser either under pressure from the enemy side or from fear of his friends." He arrived in Moscow on 28 December 1668. His Swedish entourage consisted of 35 people. While in Russia, he made a copy of the Godunov map, one of two extant copies, the original by Petr Ivanovich Godunov having not survived. He married Christina Ottiliana Börner and had a daughter, Charlotta Cronman, who married Henrik Gotthard von Buddenbrock (1648-1727). Charlotta and Henrick had as their son, Henrik Magnus Buddenbrock.

== See also ==
- Johan Gabriel Sparwenfeld
