= Dalarö =

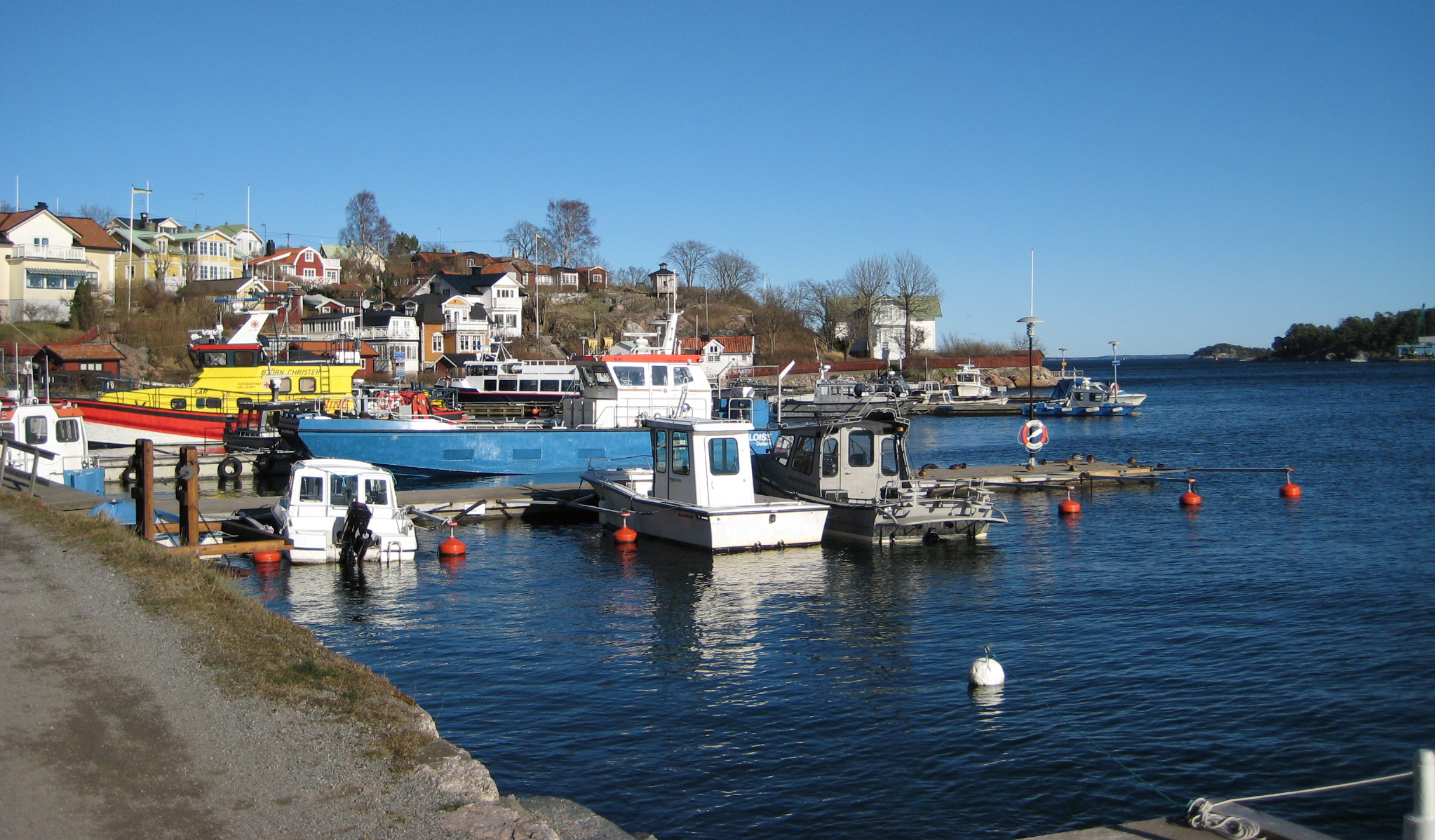
- Dalarö harbour

- Location within Stockholm Location within Sweden Location within European Union
- Coordinates: 59°08′N 18°24′E
- Country: Sweden
- Province: Södermanland
- County: Stockholm County
- Municipality: Haninge Municipality

Area
  - Total: 1.68 km^{2} (0.65 sq mi)

Population (31 December 2020)
  - Total: 1,915
  - Density: 1,140/km^{2} (2,950/sq mi)
- Time zone: UTC+1 (CET)
  - Summer (DST): UTC+2 (CEST)

Dalarö is a locality situated in Haninge Municipality, Stockholm County, Sweden with 1,199 inhabitants in 2010.

It is situated south-east of Stockholm and is part of Metropolitan Stockholm and serves as a recreational summer spot for Stockholmers. At the beginning of the year 2004, the automobile company Volvo used the town for the unconventional The Mystery of Dalarö advertising campaign.

Dalarö is Haninge Municipality's oldest locality, originally an old maritime pilot and customs community. Today Dalarö is largely characterized by the developments which were added in the late 1800s, when the area became a popular summer resort for Stockholmers. Dalarö has long been home to Swedish high society's seaside houses. Since the 19th century, the town of Dalarö has been a holiday resort for the international guests. The historical valuable buildings are of national interest. Dalarö and the surrounding built-up area has a diverse year-round and summer cottages. During the summer months Dalarö is frequented by many tourists.

== See also ==
- Dalarö Fortress

== Residents ==
- Joachim von Rohr, commander of the Dalarö fortress
- Captain Carl Peter Blom, founder of Smådalarö gård
