= Kymmendö =

Island in Sweden

Coordinates: 59°6′35″N 18°30′2″E

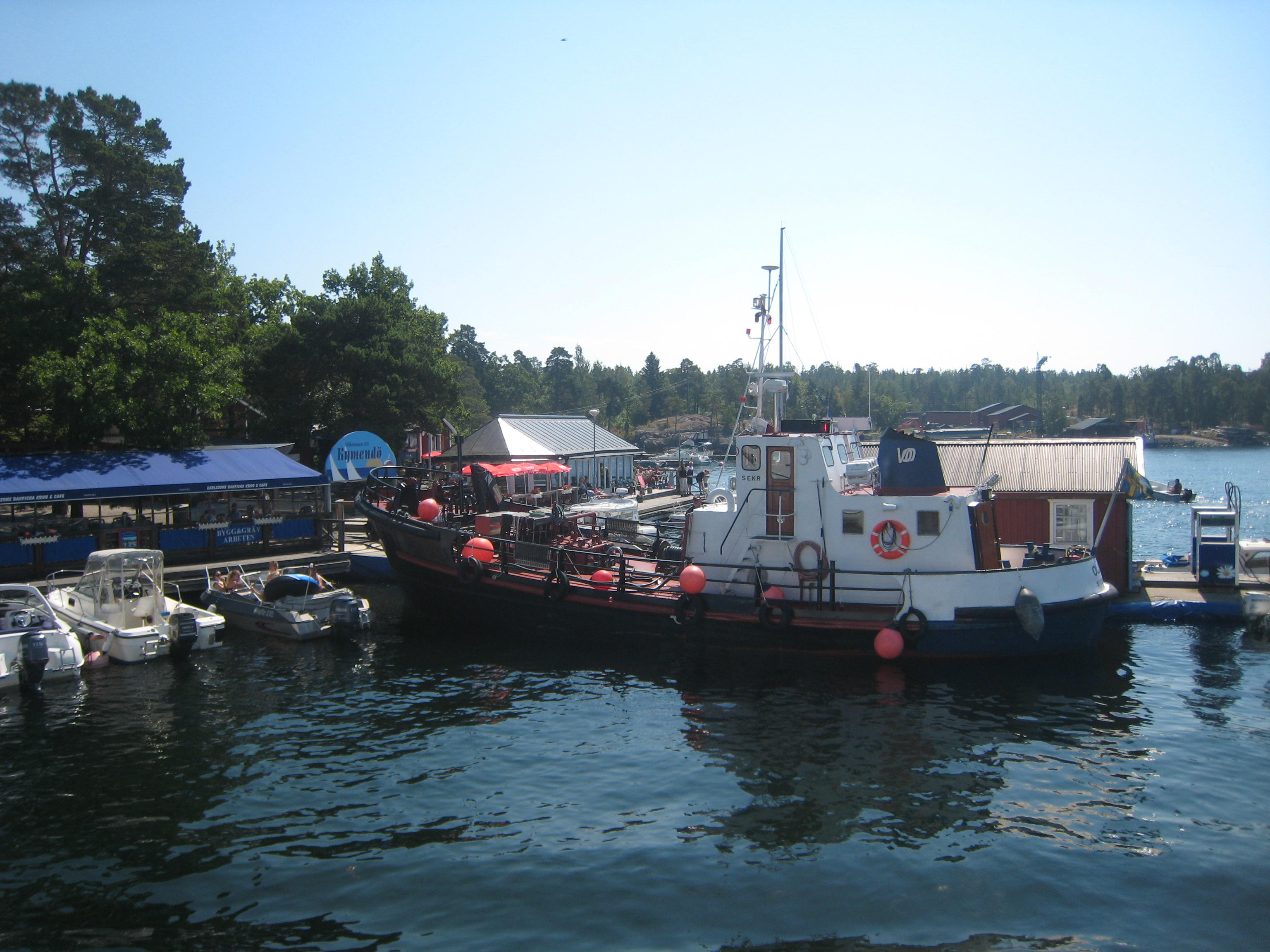
The wharf of Kymmendö.

Kymmendö (Swedish pronunciation: [ˈɕʏ̂mːɛnˌdøː]) is an island in the south of the Stockholm archipelago. Kymmendö is the model for the fictional island Hemsö in August Strindberg's novel The People of Hemsö.
