= Kodavere =

Village in Estonia

Coordinates: 58°41′N 27°09′E

Kodavere Kodavere küla
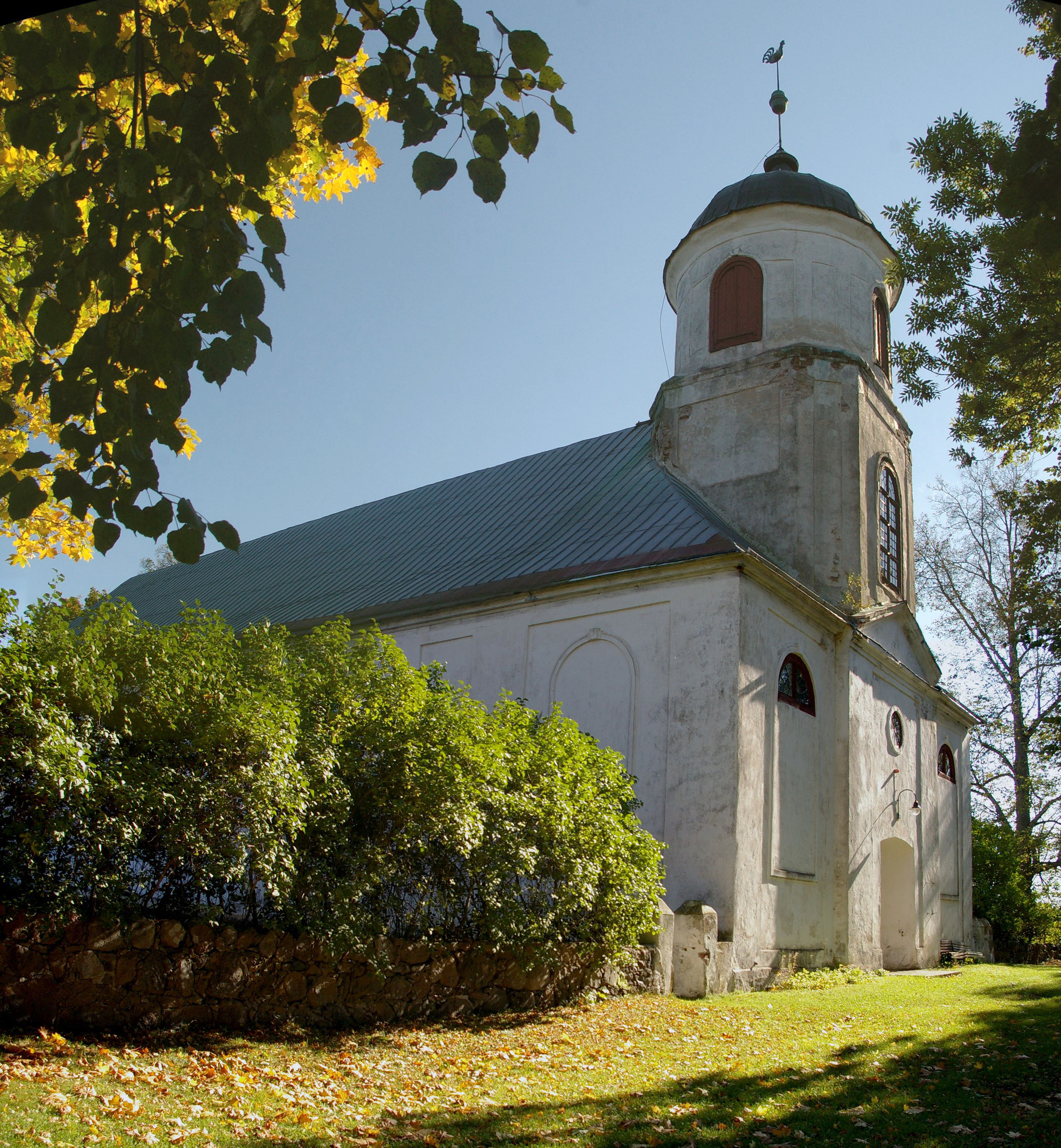
- Kodavere Church
- Interactive map of Kodavere
- Country: Estonia
- County: Tartu County

Population (2008)
  - Total: 65
- Time zone: UTC+2 (EET)
  - Summer (DST): UTC+3 (EEST)

Kodavere (German: Koddafer) is a village in Peipsiääre Parish, Tartu County, Estonia. It lies on the shore of Lake Peipus.

== History ==
On 18 October 2019, the new village of Tedreküla was established from the southern part of Kodavere on the territory of the village of Pärsikivi.

== Notable people ==
Notable people that were born or lived in Kodavere include the following:

- Villem Ernits (1891–1982), linguist and politician
