= Kastellegården =

Building in Kungälv Municipality, Gothenburg and Bohus County, Sweden

Coordinates: 57.84956°N 11.93788°E

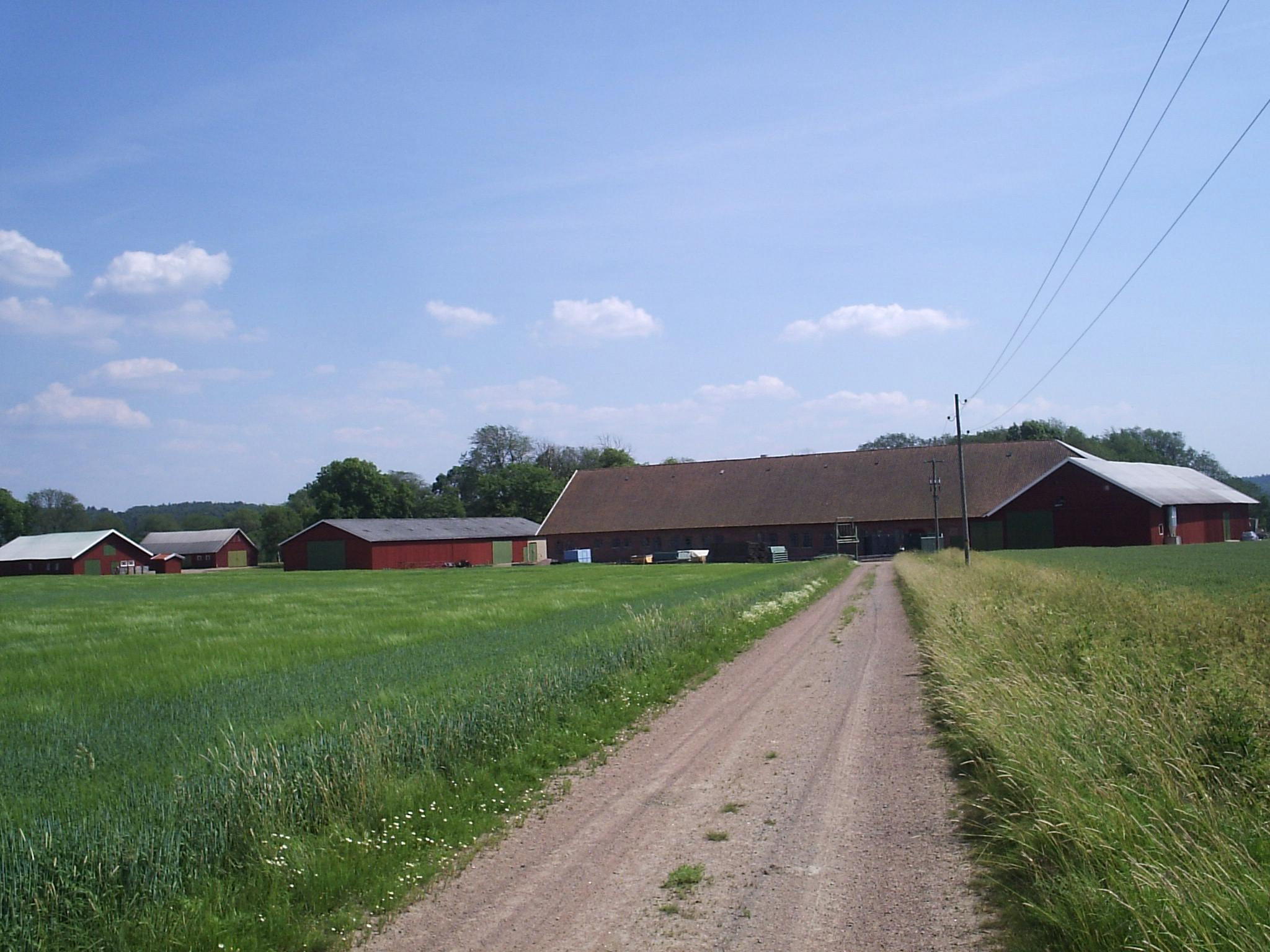
- Interactive map of the Kastellegården area

General information
- Location: Bohuslän, Sweden

Kastellegården is a mansion and gardens in Bohuslän, Sweden. It is located in Kungälv Municipality.
