= Joachim von Rohr =

Swedish military officer (1678–1757)

- Born: January 23, 1678
- Died: September 9, 1757 (aged 79); Dalarö
- Known for: Battle of Poltava
- Spouse: Catharina Charlotta Klingenberg (m. 1699–1757)
- Parent(s): Hans Christoffer von Rohr; Anna Catharina Cronman
- Military career
- Allegiance: (Sweden) Swedish Empire
- Service years: c. 1700–1757
- Rank: Lieutenant Colonel; Commandant of Dalarö fortress
- Conflicts: Battle of Poltava

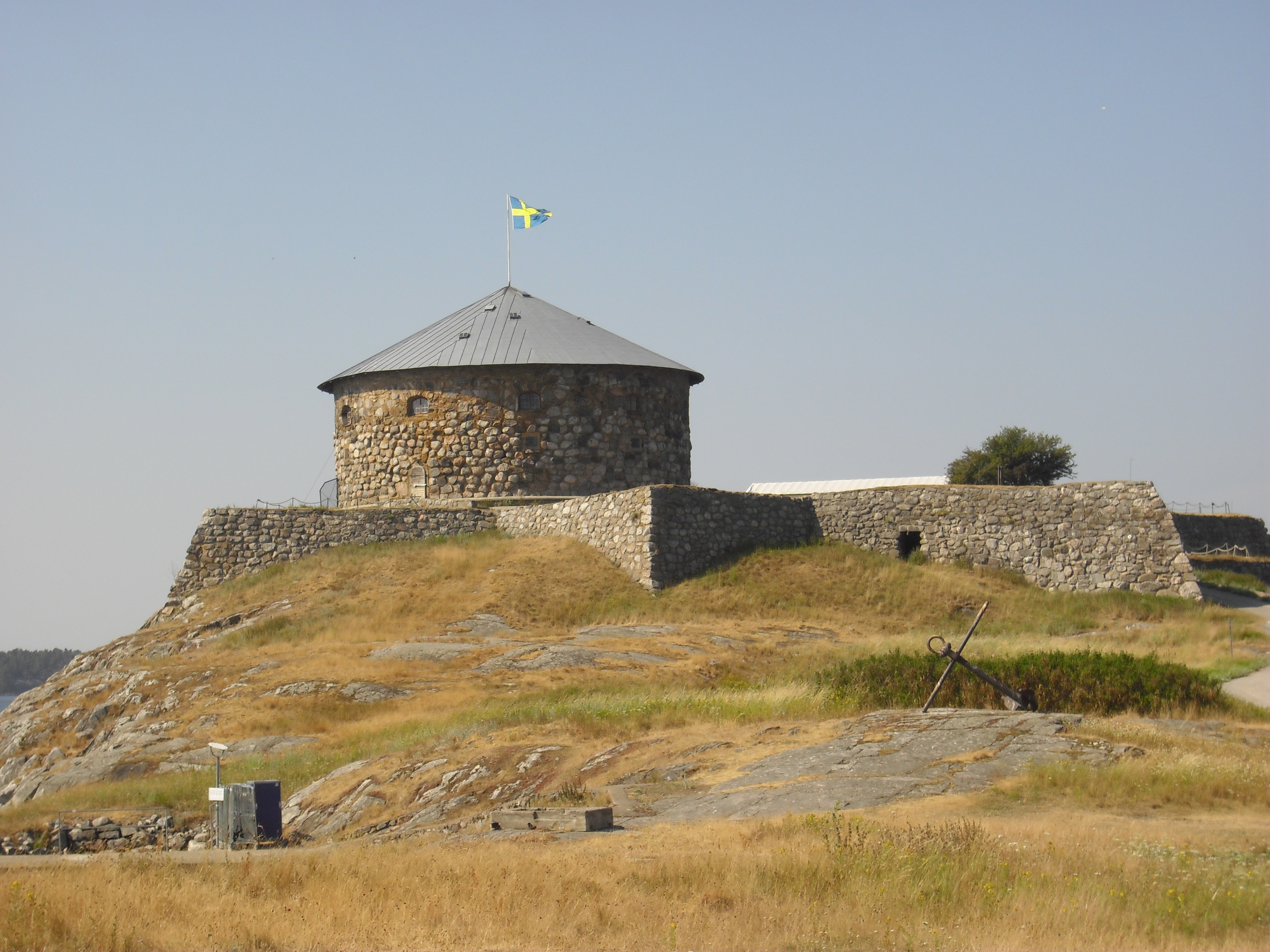
He was commander of the Dalarö fortress

Joachim von Rohr (January 23, 1678 – September 9, 1757) was a lieutenant colonel for the Swedish Empire and Commandant of the Dalarö fortress. He participated in the Battle of Poltava and was captured and held as a prisoner of war in Solikamsk in Russia.

== Biography ==
Joachim was born on January 23, 1678 (old style) in Sweden. He was the son of Hans Christoffer von Rohr (1626–1700) who was killed in action during the Battle of Narva; and Anna Catharina Cronman. Anna was the daughter of Hans Detterman Cronman. Joachim married Catharina Charlotta Klingenberg (1680–1758) on February 4, 1699 (old style) in Sweden. Together they had the following children:

- Anna Elisabeth von Rohr (1700–1744) who married Anders Örbom (1675–1740) who was a captain in the Swedish Army. Örbom was born in Örebro, Sweden on May 9, 1675. His father was a man named Brask, who was a District Court Judge in Örebro. Anders joined the military in 1691 and he took part in the campaign at Humlebæk on Zealand, a Danish island where Copenhagen is located, in 1700. On July 7, 1701, he left camp and on July 9, 1701, he crossed the Düna River in Riga in Ukraine. There they conquered the Saxony troops and took about 700 prisoners. He fought in the Battle of Klissow on July 7, 1702, and the Battle of Pułtusk on April 21, 1703. He participated in the Battle of Reusch-Lemberg in 1704, and the Battle of Fraustadt on February 3, 1706, and was promoted to lieutenant with Jämtland's rifle regiment. He participated on July 4, 1708, in the Battle of Holowczyn. He was wounded with a bullet to the face. The bullet remained lodged in his skull the remainder of his life. He also participated in the Battle of Lakowitz. He was captured on the Dnieper River, in Ukraine on July 1, 1709, and was taken to Russia as a prisoner of war along with other officers following the Surrender at Perevolochna. All the soldiers were executed, and the officers were imprisoned in Russia. He married Anna Elisabeth Von Rohr (1701-1744) on September 5, 1719, in Solikamsk, Russia. Together Anders and Elisabeth had their first child in Russia. Captain Anders Örbom died on May 25, 1740, and he was buried in Rödön, Sweden on June 5, 1740.
- Lucia Dorotea von Rohr (1702)
- Lunetta von Rohr II (1704–1764) who married Baron Gustaf Adolf Clodt (1692–1738). He was the son of Baron Johan Adolph Clodt von Jurgensburg
- Helena von Rohr (1706–1780)
- Hans Christoffer von Rohr II (1708–1790)
- Brita Maria von Rohr (1711–1762) who married Herman Ross (1707–1777)
- Magnus Joakim von Rohr (1710–1722)
- Catharina Charlotta von Rohr (1714–1784) who married Jacob Daniel Mether (1718–1769)
- Christina Dorothea von Rohr (1717–1800)
- Gustaf Johan von Rohr (1723–1739)
- Maria Margareta von Rohr (1725–1778) who married Gustaf Mannerstedt (1713–1756).

Joachim von Rohr was taken prisoner on June 28, 1709, during the Battle of Poltava just before the Surrender at Perevolochna. Joachim along with his wife and daughter were sent to Siberia. His firstborn daughter, Anna von Rohr married Anders Örbom (1675–1740) while in Solikamsk in Russia. At the war's end, Joachim and his family were allowed to return to Sweden. He became the Commandant of Dalarö on January 23, 1743, and he died on September 9, 1757.

== Ancestors ==
Joachim von Rohr's ancestors in three generations
Joachim von Rohr	Father: Hans Christoffer von Rohr	Paternal Grandfather: Georg von Rohr	Paternal Great-Grandfather:
Joachim von Rohr	Father: Hans Christoffer von Rohr	Paternal Grandfather: Georg von Rohr	Paternal Great-grandmother:
Joachim von Rohr	Father: Hans Christoffer von Rohr	Paternal Grandmother:	Paternal Great-Grandfather:
Joachim von Rohr	Father: Hans Christoffer von Rohr	Paternal Grandmother:	Paternal Great-Grandmother:
Joachim von Rohr	Mother: Anna Catharina Cronman	Maternal Grandfather: Joachim Cronman	Maternal Great-Grandfather: Lord Hans Detterman Cronman, of Liveland, Latvia
Joachim von Rohr	Mother: Anna Catharina Cronman	Maternal Grandfather: Joachim Cronman	Maternal Great-Grandmother: Ursula Kordes
Joachim von Rohr	Mother: Anna Catharina Cronman	Maternal Grandmother: Lunetta Makeléer	Maternal Great-grandfather: Hans Makeléer, 1st Baronet
Joachim von Rohr	Mother: Anna Catharina Cronman	Maternal Grandmother: Lunetta Makeléer	Maternal Great-Grandmother: Anna Gubbertz
