= Gåsevadholm Castle =

Building in Kungsbacka Municipality, Halland County, Sweden

- Kungsbacka Municipality, Sweden
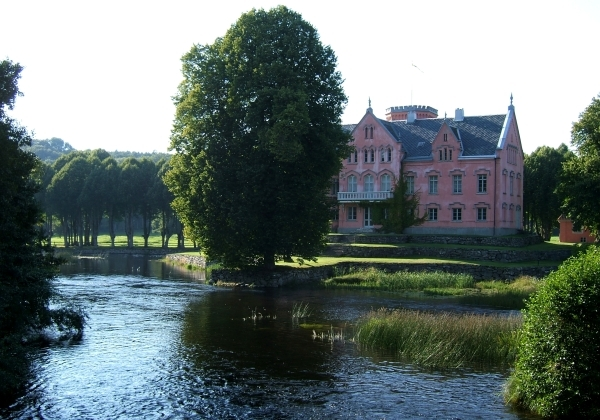

Site information
- Type: Castle

Location
- Coordinates: 57°29′36″N 12°07′22″E

Gåsevadholm Castle is a castle on an island in the Rolfsån river in Halland, Sweden. Sir John Maclean, 1st Baronet was the Lord of Gåsevadholm.

== See also ==
- List of castles in Sweden
