= Von Rohr =

Coat of arms of von Rohr family

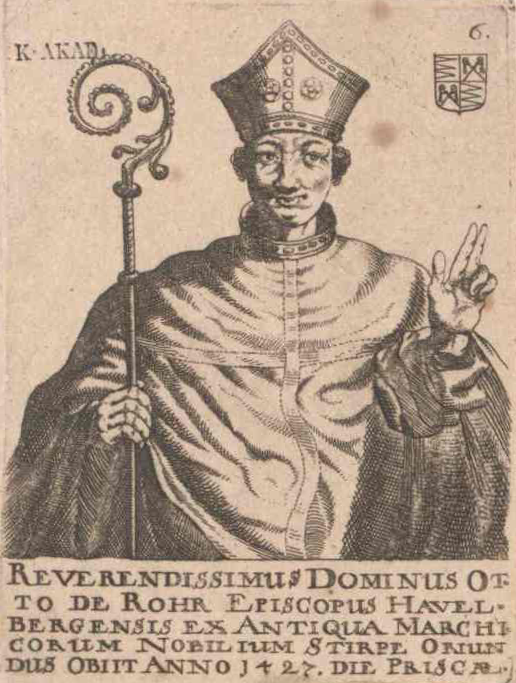

The von Rohr is an old German noble family, also belonging to the Swedish and Finnish nobility.

== History ==
The earliest recorded family member was Otto von Rohr (c. 1350–1427), the German Bishop of Havelberg from 1401 to 1427. The Von Rohrs are Swedish House of Nobility noble family number 807 and Finnish House of Nobility noble family number 85.

== Notable members ==
- Bernhard von Rohr (1421–1487), Salzburg archbishop
- Ferdinand von Rohr (1783–1851), Prussian general and minister of war
- Götz von Rohr (born 1944), German geographer and educator
- Hanns Bernd-Christian von Rohr (1895–1988), Officer
- Hans Joachim von Rohr (1888–1971), German politician
- Hans Christoffer von Rohr (1626–1700), Swedish captain ennobled in the Swedish House of Nobility who died in the Battle of Narva
- Hans-Babo von Rohr (1922–1945), German lieutenant
- Joachim von Rohr (1677–1757), Swedish lieutenant colonel and commander
- Julius Bernhard von Rohr (1688–1742), Saxon cameralist, natural scientist and writer
- Kurt von Rohr (1843–1910), Prussian politician
- Moritz von Rohr (1868–1940), German optical scientist
- Otto von Rohr (bass) (1914–1982), German opera singer
- Wilhelm Eugen Ludwig Ferdinand von Rohr (1783–1851), Prussian general and minister of war
- Chris von Rohr (born 1951), Swiss musician

== von Röhr ==
- Julius Philip Benjamin von Röhr (1737–1793), Prussian botanist and plant collector, naturalist, medical doctor and watercolourist
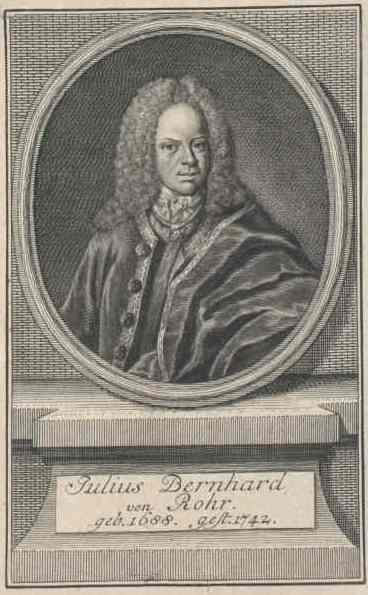

Von Rohrs of Sweden

Von Rohrs of Sweden

Von Rohrs of Wappen

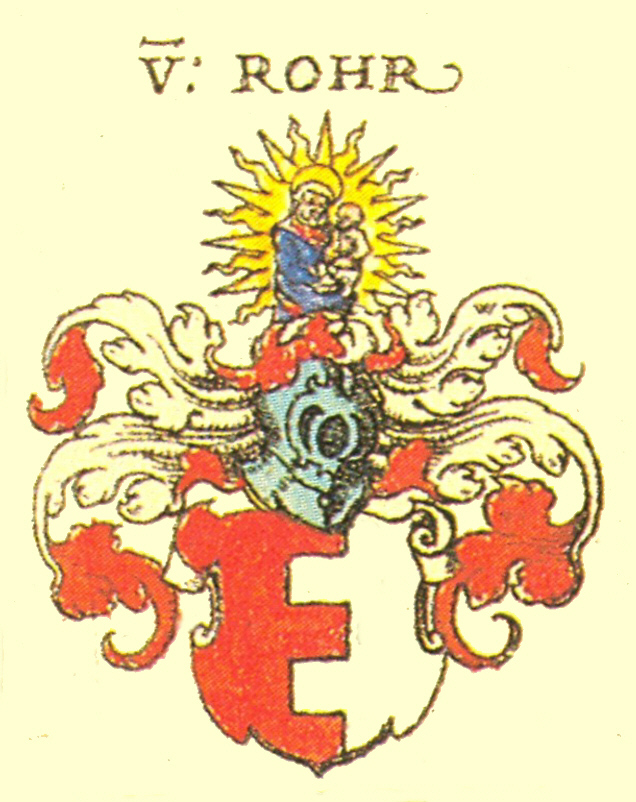
Von Rohrs of Bayern

== See also ==
- Röhr (surname)
