= Dalarö Fortress =

Coordinates: 59°6′46″N 18°23′25″E

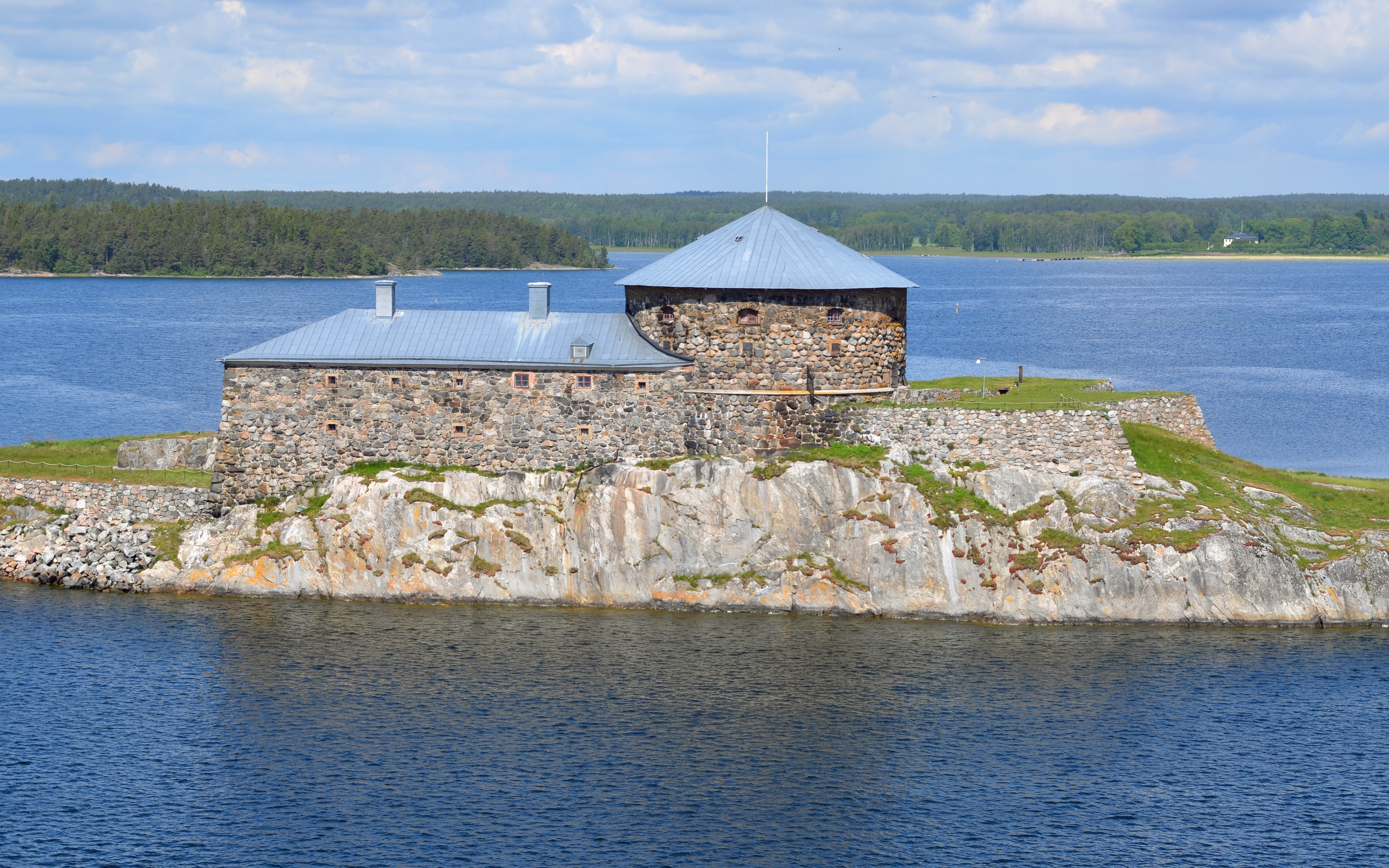

Dalarö fortress is a fortification located just south of Dalarö. The current structure was built by Charles X Gustav of Sweden in 1656.

== History ==
It was built to replace an old structure from 1623. In 1683 the fortress was renovated by Erik Dahlbergh and the renovations were completed in 1698. The fortress has never been under siege. Russian forces avoided it in 1719. It was decommissioned by the military in 1854. Today the building is a museum and it contains a restaurant.

== Commandants ==
- Joachim von Rohr (1678–1757), commander of the Dalarö fortress from 1743 to 1757.
