= Johan Makeléer =

Johan Makeléer, 2nd Baronet
- Born: John MacLean; 2 January 1636; Sweden
- Died: 15 April 1696 (aged 60); Gothenburg, Sweden
- Occupation: Gothenburg Court of Justice
- Predecessor: John Hans Makeléer, 1st Baronet
- Successor: Sir Johan Jacob Makeléer, 3rd Baronet
- Spouse: Anna Margareta Gordon
- Children: Sir Johan Jacob Makeléer, 3rd Baronet; Sir Gustav Makeléer, 4th Baronet
- Parent(s): Hans Makeléer, 1st Baronet; Anna Gubbertz

Sir Johan Makeléer, 2nd Baronet or Johan Macklier (1636 – 1696) was a member of the Maclean clan of Scotland in Sweden and a member of the Gothenburg Court of Justice from 1659 to 1696.

== Biography ==
He was the son of Hans Makeléer, 1st Baronet and Anna Gubbertz. He married Anna Margareta Gordon and had two children: Sir Johan Jacob Makeléer, 3rd Baronet and Sir Gustav Makeléer, 4th Baronet. Gustav was the father of Sir Johan Gabriel Macklear, 5th Baronet, who married Hedwig Rosenquist. Johan Makeléer, 2nd Baronet was later appointed to the Gothenburg Court of Justice.
