= Storming of Lemberg =

Battle of the Great Northern War

Coordinates: 49°50′33″N 24°01′56″E

Storming of Lemberg (Lviv)
- Part of the Great Northern War
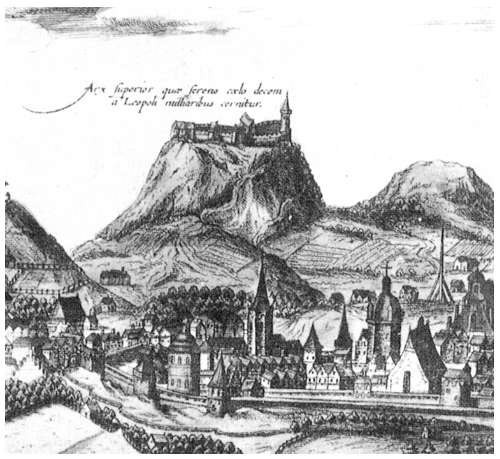
- Lemberg (Lviv) in the 17th century
Date	26 August 1704 (O.S.); 27 August 1704 (Swedish calendar); 6 September 1704 (N.S.)
Location	Lviv, Polish–Lithuanian Commonwealth. Present-day Ukraine
Result	Swedish victory

Belligerents
Swedish Empire	Polish–Lithuanian Commonwealth

Commanders and leaders
Charles XII of Sweden	Franciszek Gałecki

Strength
1,500–2,000 men	600 men

Casualties and losses
30–40 killed and wounded	50–60 killed, 530 captured

The Storming of Lemberg or Lviv on 6 September 1704 (N.S.) was a successful Swedish assault on the city of Lemberg (Lviv), in the Polish–Lithuanian Commonwealth, during the Great Northern War.

== Prelude ==
The governor of Lemberg, Franciszek Gałecki, had earlier refused to pay a contribution demanded by the Swedes. Charles XII of Sweden, likely angered by this, struck camp at Jarosław, on 1 September, and marched towards Lemberg with 16 regiments. He arrived with his vanguard on 5 September (Note: The same day as the Swedish garrison at Warsaw surrendered. (Rosen 1936, p. 276)) and immediately drove off a force of around two thousand under Janusz Antoni Wiśniowiecki and Stanisław Mateusz Rzewuski, after a brief fight. The garrison, about 600 strong (including 200 Saxons), then quickly scorched the suburbs and opened fire with cannons.

== Storming ==
Charles, who wanted to storm the town immediately, proceeded with a reconnaissance from the Lviv High Castle and ordered three dragoon regiments to prepare to attack; heavy rain, however, forced him to postpone it until the following day. While the dragoon regiments made preparations, the rest of the force encircled the town to block any relief forces. The following day, 6 September, the attack was carried out. About 50 Swedes stormed a fortified monastery outside the town, while Charles with the remainder of the force climbed the earthwork, where a wooden wall had to be cut through. This protected the large fortification walls directly surrounding the town. As they attacked, they were shot at through the portholes of the wooden wall. The defenders were, however, effectively forced away by grenades. As the Swedes broke through, the defenders panicked and ran towards the main gate accessing the town, with Charles pursuing them. In the chaos, the Swedes managed to take control of the gate, then the town square, and soon the whole town, all in half an hour. (Note: Similar to how the Battle of Pułtusk played out. (Rosen 1936, p. 284)) The fortified monastery had also been captured.

== Aftermath ==
Between 30 and 40 Swedes had been killed or wounded during the fighting while the garrison lost about 530 men captured and between 50 and 60 killed, apart from a few armed citizens. (Note: The Swedes seized the weapons from about 600 armed citizens after the battle. (Unknown 1704, p. 5)) Charles struck camp with his forces on 23–24 September, and marched towards Warsaw which had been captured by Augustus II of Poland. He soon caught up with the Saxon forces, under Johann Matthias von der Schulenburg, at the Battle of Punitz.

== Sources ==
=== Bibliography ===
- Unknown (1704), Kort berättelse, om det i Pohlen öfwerståndne fälttoget åhr 1704
- Fryxell, Anders (1861). Lebensgeschichte Karl des Zwölften, Königs von Schweden, Vol. 1, Brunswick
- Lundblad, Knut (1835). Geschichte Karl des Zwölften Königs von Schweden, Vol. 1, Hamburg
- Nordberg, Jöran (1740), Konung Carl den XII:tes historia, Stockholm: Directeuren Pet. Momma
- Rosen, Carl (1936), Bidrag till kännedom om de händelser, som närmast föregingo svenska stormaktsväldets fall, volume I, Stockholm: P.A. Norstedt & Söner
- Tessin, Georg (1967). Die deutschen Regimenter der Krone Schweden: Unter Karl X. Gustav (1654–1660), Böhlau
- Voltaire (1761) Geschichte Carls XII., Frankfurt am Main.
