= Hageby =

Urban area in Norrköping, Sweden

Coordinates: 58°34′14″N 16°12′23″E

Hageby is a Million Programme area in southern Norrköping, Sweden. It is mostly made up of multi-family residential buildings built between the years of 1950 and 1960. One of the biggest shopping malls in Sweden is also located in Hageby. Even though construction of Hageby was to large extent completed when the Million Programme was initiated in 1965, many still consider the area to be typical for these projects.

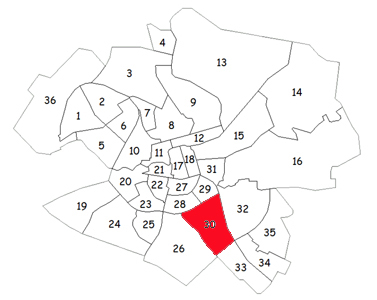
