= Röhr (surname) =

Röhr (Roehr) (German pronunciation: [ˈʁøːɐ̯]) is a surname. Notable people with the name include:

- Julius (Philip Benjamin) von Röhr (1737–1793), a Prussian botanist and plant collector, naturalist, medical doctor and watercolourist
- Julius Edward Roehr (1860–?), member of the Wisconsin State Senate
- (Franz Hermann) Otto Röhr (1891–1972), a German track and field athlete
- Hans Gustav Röhr (1895–1937), a German aviation pioneer and automobile designer
- Julius von Rohr (1737–1793), German-born Danish botanist
- Matthias "Gonzo" Röhr (born 1962, Frankfurt), rock guitarist
- Peter Roehr (1944–1968), a German painter
- Walter Roehrich, founder of the Roehr Motorcycle Company, a US motorcycle manufacturer
