= Sir Archibald Acheson, 1st Baronet =

Scottish jurist

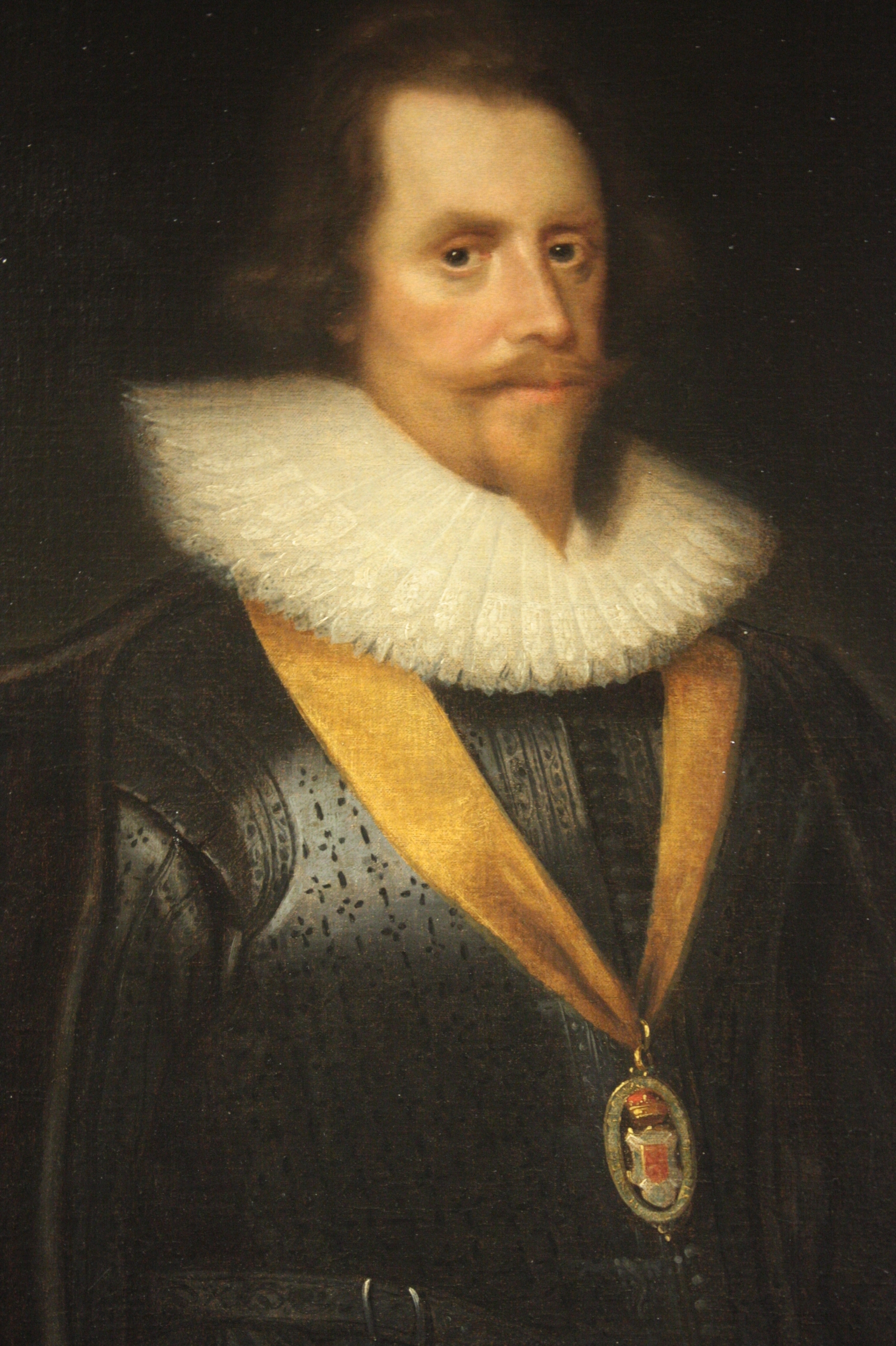
Lord Glencairn by George Jamesone, 1631

Sir Archibald Acheson of Glencairn, Lord Glencairn, 1st Baronet (1583 – 9 September 1634), was a Scottish jurist.

== Biography ==
Acheson was the son of Captain Patrick Acheson and Martha Drummond.

On 31 March 1620, "Archibald Acheson, a Scotchman", was knighted at Theobalds by King James I, and in 1621 he was appointed Master in Chancery of Ireland. Sometime before 25 October 1626 he was appointed a Lord of Session of Scotland as 'Lord Glencairn'. On 21 October 1627, he was appointed by King Charles I as Royal Secretary of State of Scotland. On 1 January 1628, he was made a Baronet of Nova Scotia.

In 1633 he built Acheson House just off the Royal Mile on the Canongate in Edinburgh's Old Town. The building survives, standing behind Huntly House Museum.

Lord Glencairn died at Letterkenny, County Donegal, in the west of Ulster in September 1634.

=== Ireland ===
In 1610, at the start of the Plantation of Ulster, numerous land grants were made in the precinct of Fewes in County Armagh. One was of 2,000 acres to Sir James Douglas, Knt., of Spott, Haddingtonshire, subsequently sold the next year to Henry Acheson, who afterwards sold it to Sir Archibald Acheson. A further 1,000 acres originally granted to Henry was also sold on to Sir Archibald Acheson in 1628. Acheson does not ever appear to have resided in Ireland, however, and his position in the Court of Chancery there appears titular; his judicial duties were all in Scotland. He nevertheless became a "denizen" of Ireland on 12 February 1618, presumably in order to qualify for the lands he was receiving from his brother, Henry Acheson of Dromlech, County Armagh. Certainly Sir Archibald's second son, George, resided in Ireland.

=== Family ===
Acheson wed Agnes Vernor at some point before 1610, fathering two daughters and an eldest son, Sir Patrick Acheson, 2nd Baronet (c.1611-1638). Sir John Scot (1754) states that this son died after his first year of marriage, to an English heiress, without issue.

After his first wife died, Sir Archibald remarried in 1622, Margaret, daughter of Sir John Hamilton and Johanna Everard, by whom he had a son, George (1629–1685).

By his first wife he had a daughter, Jean, who married Sir Lewis Lauder of Over Gogar & Alderston, Knt., (c1599-c1640), Sheriff-Principal of Edinburgh and son of Sir Alexander Lauder of Haltoun, Knt. They had at least three known children. Jean was still living on 3 April 1663 as "relict of Sir Lewes Lauder of Over Gogar".

Lord Glencairn may have had another daughter by one of his marriages, Isabella Acheson of Gosford, who married Hector Og Maclean (1583–1623). Sources list her as the daughter of "Sir Archibald Acheson", but because of her age, she may have been the daughter of Captain Patrick Acheson or one of his siblings. If she was the same age as Hector Og Maclean, she would have been born in 1583 and would have had her first child around 1600 at age 17. If she was the daughter of Sir Archibald Acheson she would be born no earlier than 1610 the year Archibald married. This would make her at least 20 years younger than Hector Og Maclean, and would make her the same age as her own children. This is the error in the standard genealogy.

His eldest son Patrick succeeded him to the baronetcy but having died without issue several years after his father, whereupon the title passed to his half-brother Sir George Acheson, 3rd Baronet, who relocated to Ireland and in 1657 was High Sheriff of Counties Armagh and Tyrone.

Baronetage of Nova Scotia
New creation	Baronet (of Glencairny); 1628–1634	Succeeded by Patrick Acheson
