= Sir Allan Maclean, 6th Baronet =

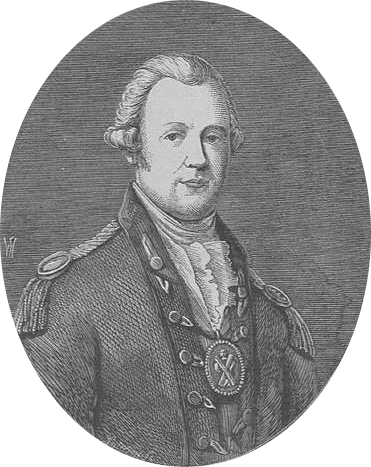

22nd Clan Chief 6th Baronet 4th Laird of Brolas 2nd Lord Maclean
- In office 1750–1783
- Preceded by: Sir Hector Maclean, 5th Baronet, third cousin
- Succeeded by: Sir Hector Maclean, 7th Baronet, fourth cousin

Personal details
- Born: 1710 Torloisk
- Died: 10 December 1783 (aged 73)
- Parent: Donald Maclean, 3rd Laird of Brolas

Sir Allan Maclean, 6th Baronet of Morvern (1710 – 10 December 1783) was the 22nd Clan Chief of Clan Maclean from 1750 till his death in 1783. He was the 4th Laird of Brolas. He died without leaving a male heir to his title, so the title was bestowed on his closest living male relative, a fourth cousin, Sir Hector Maclean, 7th Baronet.

== Early years ==
He was born in 1710 in Torloisk to Donald Maclean, 3rd Laird of Brolas. He became the Clan Maclean Chief when Sir Hector Maclean, 5th Baronet, his third cousin, died without an heir in 1750.

== Military career ==
He began his military career in the service of The Netherlands as a lieutenant in a brigade of Scots Highlanders. He participated in the assault and capture of Bergen-op-Zoom. He then obtained a commission in the 60th or royal American regiment, of which he was for some time an adjutant. He served as a captain in the expedition of Major General James Wolfe in 1759 for the conquest of Canada. He was afterward appointed to the command of the New York independent company, with which he was present at the Battle of Ticonderoga. During the battle he was severely wounded. He was again wounded during the action that preceded the surrender of Fort Niagara. At the end of the Canadian war he returned to England. During the American Revolutionary War he was promoted to the rank of colonel, he and his men were instrumental in the defeat of Benedict Arnold at Quebec. The garrison consisted of 50 fusileers and 350 Highland emigrants, and 700 militia and seamen. Sir Guy Carleton, 1st Baron Dorchester was occupied with arrangements for the general defense of the colony, so the defense of the town was entrusted to Maclean. Some of the faint-hearted and disaffected were now inclined to open the gates to the enemy, but were held in check by Maclean, who guarded the gate with his Highlanders, forbade all communication with the besiegers, and fired upon their flag, an ensign of rebellion, with the result that, after Richard Montgomery was killed, Benedict Arnold abandoned the siege and left the country. Colonel Maclean was subsequently stationed at Fort Niagara, and participated in the Battle of Eutaw Springs with his regiment. He was promoted to brigadier-general after leaving North America.

== Marriage and children ==
He married Anne (Una, 1728-1760), daughter of Hector Maclean, 11th of Coll (c. 1689-1754), also referred to as 14th Laird of Coll or 12th of Coll and had the following daughters:

- Maria Maclean, married Charles Maclean of Kinlochaline
- Sibella Maclean, married John Maclean of Inverscadell
- Ann Maclean, married Dr. Mackenzie Grieve of Edinburgh

His wife died in 1760.

== Later years and death ==
Sir Allan entertained Samuel Johnson and James Boswell on Inch Kenneth in October 1773. Allan Maclean died in 1783 or 1784 without a son and his title went to a fourth cousin, Sir Hector Maclean, 7th Baronet.

== Ancestors ==
Sir Allan Maclean, 6th Baronet, 4th Laird of Brolas and 22nd Clan Chief's ancestors in three generations
Sir Allan Maclean, 6th Baronet, 4th Laird of Brolas and 22nd Clan Chief	Father: Donald Maclean, 3rd Laird of Brolas	Paternal Grandfather: Lauchlan Maclean, 2nd Laird of Brolas	Paternal Great-Grandfather: Donald Maclean, 1st Laird of Brolas
Sir Allan Maclean, 6th Baronet, 4th Laird of Brolas and 22nd Clan Chief	Father: Donald Maclean, 3rd Laird of Brolas	Paternal Grandfather: Lauchlan Maclean, 2nd Laird of Brolas	Paternal Great-grandmother: Florence, daughter of John Garbh Maclean, 7th Laird of Coll
Sir Allan Maclean, 6th Baronet, 4th Laird of Brolas and 22nd Clan Chief	Father: Donald Maclean, 3rd Laird of Brolas	Paternal Grandmother: Isabella Maclean of Torloisk	Paternal Great-Grandfather: Hector Maclean, 2nd Laird of Torloisk
Sir Allan Maclean, 6th Baronet, 4th Laird of Brolas and 22nd Clan Chief	Father: Donald Maclean, 3rd Laird of Brolas	Paternal Grandmother: Isabella Maclean of Torloisk	Paternal Great-Grandmother: Catherine, daughter of John Campbell of Lochnell
Sir Allan Maclean, 6th Baronet, 4th Laird of Brolas and 22nd Clan Chief	Mother: Isabella MacLean of Ardgour	Maternal Grandfather: Allan Maclean, 10th Laird of Ardgour	Maternal Great-Grandfather: Ewen Maclean, 9th Laird of Ardgour
Sir Allan Maclean, 6th Baronet, 4th Laird of Brolas and 22nd Clan Chief	Mother: Isabella MacLean of Ardgour	Maternal Grandfather: Allan Maclean, 10th Laird of Ardgour	Maternal Great-Grandmother: Mary, daughter of Lachlan Maclean of Lochbuie
Sir Allan Maclean, 6th Baronet, 4th Laird of Brolas and 22nd Clan Chief	Mother: Isabella MacLean of Ardgour	Maternal Grandmother: Anne Cameron of Lochiel	Maternal Great-grandfather: Sir Ewen Cameron of Lochiel
Sir Allan Maclean, 6th Baronet, 4th Laird of Brolas and 22nd Clan Chief	Mother: Isabella MacLean of Ardgour	Maternal Grandmother: Anne Cameron of Lochiel	Maternal Great-Grandmother: Isabel, daughter of Sir Lachlan Maclean, 1st Baronet

Baronetage of Nova Scotia
Preceded by Hector Maclean	Baronet (of Duart and Morvern); 1751–1783	Succeeded by Hector Maclean
