= Donald Maclean, 3rd Laird of Brolas =

Scottish clan chief

- Born: Donald Maclean circa 1700
- Died: 1725
- Title: Laird of Brolas
- Predecessor: Lauchlan Maclean, 2nd Laird of Brolas
- Successor: Sir Allan Maclean, 4th Laird of Brolas
- Spouse(s): Isabella, daughter of Allan MacLean of Ardgour
- Children: Sir Allan Maclean, 6th Baronet
- Parent(s): Lauchlan Maclean, 2nd Laird of Brolas; Isabella, daughter of Hector MacLean, Laird of Torloisk

Donald Maclean, 3rd Laird of Brolas (c. 1670–1725) was the Laird of Brolas.

== Biography ==
His father, Lauchlan Maclean, 2nd Laird of Brolas, died at an early age. Donald entered the army and served for some time as lieutenant during the reign of Queen Anne; but in the attempt made by her brother for the recovery of the crown of his ancestors, in 1715, Maclean of Brolass served as lieutenant-colonel under his cousin, Sir John Maclean, 4th Baronet, at the Battle of Sheriffmuir, where he received two severe wounds on the head from a trooper's saber.

He was married to Isabella, daughter of Allan MacLean, 10th Laird of Ardgour. They had the following children:

- Sir Allan Maclean, 6th Baronet; 4th Laird of Brolas; and 22nd Clan Chief of Clan Maclean
- Catherine Maclean, married to Lachlan, son of Donald Maclean of Coll
- Isabella Maclean, married to John Maclean of Lochbuie
- Anna Maclean, married to Allan Maclean of Drimnin

Donald also had a natural, or illegitimate son, called Gillian Maclean, who became a lieutenant in Guernsey, was married, and had issue. Donald died in 1725, and was succeeded by his son, Sir Allan Maclean, 6th Baronet, who became the Fourth Laird of Maclean, and on the death of his third cousin, Sir Hector Maclean, 5th Baronet in 1750 became the 6th Baronet and 22nd Clan Chief.

== Ancestors ==
Donald Maclean, 3rd Laird of Brolas's ancestors in three generations
Sir Allan Maclean, 6th Baronet	Father: Lauchlan Maclean, 2nd Laird of Brolas	Paternal Grandfather: Donald Maclean, 1st Laird of Brolas	Paternal Great-Grandfather: Hector Og Maclean, 15th Clan Chief
Sir Allan Maclean, 6th Baronet	Father: Lauchlan Maclean, 2nd Laird of Brolas	Paternal Grandfather: Donald Maclean, 1st Laird of Brolas	Paternal Great-grandmother: Isabella Acheson of Gosford
Sir Allan Maclean, 6th Baronet	Father: Lauchlan Maclean, 2nd Laird of Brolas	Paternal Grandmother: Florence Maclean of Coll	Paternal Great-Grandfather: John Garbh Maclean, 7th Laird of Coll
Sir Allan Maclean, 6th Baronet	Father: Lauchlan Maclean, 2nd Laird of Brolas	Paternal Grandmother: Florence Maclean of Coll	Paternal Great-Grandmother:
Sir Allan Maclean, 6th Baronet	Mother: Isabella MacLean of Torloisk	Maternal Grandfather: Hector Maclean, 2nd Laird of Torloisk	Maternal Great-Grandfather: Lachlan Og MacLean, 1st Laird of Torloisk
Sir Allan Maclean, 6th Baronet	Mother: Isabella MacLean of Torloisk	Maternal Grandfather: Hector Maclean, 2nd Laird of Torloisk	Maternal Great-Grandmother:
Sir Allan Maclean, 6th Baronet	Mother: Isabella MacLean of Torloisk	Maternal Grandmother: Catherine Campbell of Lochnell	Maternal Great-grandfather: John Campbell of Lochnell
Sir Allan Maclean, 6th Baronet	Mother: Isabella MacLean of Torloisk	Maternal Grandmother: Catherine Campbell of Lochnell	Maternal Great-Grandmother:
