= Laird of Torloisk =

The Laird of Torloisk was the hereditary owner of an estate on the Isle of Mull:

- Lachlan Og Maclean, 1st Laird of Torloisk
- Hector Maclean, 2nd Laird of Torloisk
- Lachlan Maclean, 3rd Laird of Torloisk
- Alexander Maclean, 4th Laird of Torloisk (1690-1715), was captain in the Second battalion of the Scots Guards, and served in the Spanish wars; at age twenty-five, he had his leg broken at the Battle of Brihuega, in Spain, in 1710, by a musket ball, of which he fevered and died; dying without children, he was succeeded by his cousin
- Donald Maclean, 5th Laird of Torloisk
- Hector Maclean, 6th Laird of Torloisk never married, and on his death in Glasgow on May 29, 1765, he was succeeded by his immediate younger brother
- Lachlan Maclean, 7th Laird of Torloisk

== See also ==
- Torloisk House
- Allan Maclean of Torloisk
