= Charles Maclean, Baron Maclean =

British nobleman and civil servant

The Right Honourable The Lord Maclean KT GCVO KBE PC

27th Clan Chief 11th Baronet Lord Maclean
- In office 1936-1990
- Preceded by: Sir Fitzroy Maclean, 10th Baronet, grandfather
- Succeeded by: Sir Lachlan Maclean, 12th Baronet, son

Personal details
- Born: Charles Hector Fitzroy Maclean; 5 May 1916 London, England
- Died: 8 February 1990 (aged 73) London, England
- Spouse: Elizabeth Mann (m. 1941)
- Children: 2, including Sir Lachlan Hector Charles Maclean
- Parent(s): Hector Fitzroy Maclean; Winifred Joan Wilding
- Education: Canford School

Charles Hector Fitzroy Maclean, Baron Maclean, KT, GCVO, KBE, PC (5 May 1916 – 8 February 1990) was Lord Chamberlain to Elizabeth II of the United Kingdom from 1971 to 1984. He became the 27th Clan Chief of Clan Maclean of Duart in 1936 at the death of his grandfather.

== Biography ==
Maclean was born on 5 May 1916 in London, to Major Hector Fitzroy Maclean (1873–1932) and Winifred Joan Wilding (c1875-1941), daughter of J. H. Wilding. He succeeded as the 27th Chief of Clan Maclean of Duart in 1936 at the death of his grandfather, Sir Fitzroy Maclean, 10th Baronet. He married (Joan) Elizabeth Mann (1923–2021), granddaughter of Sir Edward Mann, 1st Baronet, of Thelveton Hall in 1941. They had two children and eight grandchildren:

- The Hon. Lachlan Hector Charles Maclean (b. 1942); married with issue, including the heir to the baronetcy
- The Hon. Janet Elizabeth Maclean (b. 1944); married with issue

He saw active service in World War II while serving in the 3rd Battalion Scots Guards. He fought in France, Belgium, the Netherlands and Germany. After the war ended he became a sheep and cattle farmer in Scotland. He was Lord Lieutenant of Argyllshire from 1954 to 1975

The Boy Scouts Association appointed Maclean as its Chief Scout of the United Kingdom from 1959 to 1971 and Commonwealth from 1959 to August 1975. He oversaw the formation of his Advance Party and its The Chief Scout's Advance Party Report which resulted in sweeping changes to the Boy Scouts Association and disaffection and schisms but failed to arrest enrolment losses and shifted the balance of enrolments to younger age children. The World Organization of the Scout Movement’s committee awarded him its only distinction, the Bronze Wolf in 1967, for exceptional services to world Scouting.

He was created a life peer as Baron Maclean, of Duart and Morven in the County of Argyll in 1971. His first ceremonial assignment as Lord Chamberlain was the 1972 funeral of the Duke of Windsor. He was Lord High Commissioner to the General Assembly of the Church of Scotland in 1984 and 1985.

He died on 8 February 1990 at Hampton Court Palace.

== Honours ==
- Brigadier, Queen's Body Guard for Scotland (Royal Company of Archers)
- Knight Commander, Order of the British Empire (1967)
- Knight, Order of the Thistle (1969)
- Lord Chamberlain to Elizabeth II (1971)
- Knight Grand Cross, Royal Victorian Order (1971)
- Created a life peer as Baron Maclean, of Duart and Morvern in the County of Argyll (1971)
- Lord-in-Waiting upon retiring as Lord Chamberlain (1984)
- Recipient, Royal Victorian Chain (1984)
- Chief Steward of Hampton Court Palace (1985)

Coat of arms of Charles Maclean, Baron Maclean
Crest A Tower embattled Argent Escutcheon Quarterly: 1st, Argent a Rock Gules; 2nd, Argent a Dexter Hand fesswise couped Gules holding a Cross Crosslet fitchée in pale azure; 3rd, Or a Lymphad Oars in saltire Sails furled Sable flagged Gules; 4th, Argent a Salmon naiant proper in chief two Eagles' Heads respectant Gules; Supporters Dexter: a Seal proper; Sinister: an Ostrich with a Horseshoe in its beak proper Motto Virtue mine honour

== Ancestors ==
Ancestors of Charles Maclean, Baron Maclean

16. Sir Fitzroy Maclean, 8th Baronet
8. Sir Charles Fitzroy Maclean, 9th Baronet
17. Elizabeth Kidd
4. Sir Fitzroy Donald Maclean, 10th Baronet
9. Emily Eleanor Marsham
2. Hector Fitzroy Maclean
10. George Holland Ackers
5. Constance Marianne Ackers
1. Charles Hector Fitzroy Maclean, 11th Baronet
6. J. H. Wilding
3. Winifred Joan Wilding

Court offices
Preceded by The Lord Cobbold	Lord Chamberlain; 1971–1984	Succeeded by The Earl of Airlie
Honorary titles
Preceded by Sir Bruce Atta Campbell	Lord Lieutenant of Argyllshire; 1954–1975	Replaced by office of Lord Lieutenant of Argyll and Bute
New title	Lord Lieutenant of Argyll and Bute; 1975–1990	Succeeded by The Marquess of Bute
Preceded by Sir John Gilmour	Lord High Commissioner to the General; Assembly of the Church of Scotland; 1984–1985	Succeeded by The Viscount of Arbuthnott
The Boy Scouts Association
Preceded by The Lord Rowallan	The Scout Boy Association's Chief Scout of the United Kingdom and Overseas Territories; 1959–1971	Succeeded by Sir William Gladstone
Preceded by The Lord Rowallan	The Scout Boy Association's Chief Scout of the British Commonwealth; 1959–1975	Title relinquished
Baronetage of Nova Scotia
Preceded by Fitzroy Donald Maclean	Baronet (of Duart and Morvern); 1936–1990	Succeeded by Lachlan Hector Charles Maclean
