= Donald Maclean =

Donald Maclean or McLean may refer to:

== Scottish noblemen ==
- Donald Maclean, 1st Laird of Ardgour (fl. 1410)
- Donald Maclean, 1st Laird of Brolas (17th century)
- Donald Maclean, 3rd Laird of Brolas (c.1670–1725)
- Donald Maclean, 5th Laird of Torloisk (died 1748)

== Politicians ==
- Donald Maclean (MP, died 1874) (1800–1874), British barrister and MP for Oxford
- Donald Maclean (MP, died 1932) (1864–1932), British Liberal politician
- Donald McLean (New Zealand politician) (1820–1877)
- Donald A. McLean (1907–1973), Canadian senator from New Brunswick
- Donald H. McLean (1884–1975), US congressman from New Jersey

== Others ==
- Donald McLean (footballer) (born 1934), Scottish footballer
- Donald McLean (fur trader) (1805–1864), also known as Samadlin, Scottish fur trader in Canada
- Donald MacLean (ice hockey) (born 1977), Canadian hockey player
- Donald Maclean (judge) (1877–1947), Canadian politician and judge
- Donald McLean (pastoralist) (1772–1850), pastoralist in South Australia
- Donald Maclean (principal) (1869–1943), Scottish school principal
- Donald McLean (sailor) (born 1955), Caymanian sailor
- Donald Maclean (spy) (1913–1983), British diplomat and Soviet spy

== See also ==
- Don Maclean (disambiguation)
- John Donald McLean (1820–1866), treasurer of Queensland, Australia
- Donald MacLean Kerr (born 1939), American civil servant
