= Allan Maclean =

Allan or Alan Maclean may refer to:

== Politicians ==
- Allan McLean (Upper Canada politician) (1752–1847), Scottish-born lawyer and politician in Upper Canada
- Allan M.A. McLean (1891–1969), Canadian businessman and politician
- Alan McLean (MP), Member of Parliament for South West Norfolk, 1923–1929 and 1931–1935
- Allan McLean (Australian politician) (1840–1911)
- Al McLean (politician) (1937–2024), Canadian politician
- Alan J. H. Maclean, former politician in Jersey, Channel Islands

== Sports ==
- Allan McLean (footballer) (1898–1968), Australian footballer for Melbourne
- Alan McLean (New Zealand cricketer) (1911–2003), New Zealand cricketer
- Allan McLean (1914–1989), known as Bob McLean, South Australian cricketer and footballer
- Alan McLean (golfer), Scottish golfer

== Other people ==
- Sir Allan Maclean, 3rd Baronet (1645–1674)
- Allan Maclean, 10th Laird of Ardgour (1668–1756)
- Sir Allan Maclean, 6th Baronet (1710–1783)
- Allan Maclean of Torloisk (1725–1798), Jacobite general
- Allan McLean (philanthropist) (1822–1907), New Zealand runholder and philanthropist
- Allan McLean (outlaw) (1855–1881), Canadian outlaw
- Allan Campbell McLean (1922–1989), English author of The Glasshouse, and other books, long resident on Skye
