= Duncan Livingstone =

Scottish poet

Duncan Livingstone (Donnchadh MacDhunlèibhe) (Torloisk, Isle of Mull, 30 March 1877 – Pretoria, Republic of South Africa, 25 May 1964) was a Scottish Gaelic poet from the Isle of Mull, who lived most of his life in South Africa.

== Life ==
=== Early life ===
Duncan Livingstone was born in his grandfather's croft at Reudle, near Torloisk House on the Isle of Mull. Livingstone's grandfather, Alexander Livingstone, was the uncle of the explorer of Africa and missionary David Livingstone. His father, Donald Livingstone (Dòmhnall Mac Alasdair 'ic Iain 'ic Dhòmhnall 'ic Dhonnchaidh) (1843–1924) was a joiner and stone-mason. Duncan's mother was Jane MacIntyre (Sine nighean Donnchaidh mhic Iain) (1845-1938), a native of Ballachulish who was said to be the grandniece of the Gaelic poet Duncan Ban MacIntyre (1724-1812). Duncan was the third of seven children and the outlines of the house where he was born may still be seen today.

Duncan's parents had married in Glasgow in 1872. His mother had worked as a domestic servant. His father had lived in Canada and worked in the construction of timber houses. When Duncan was 18-months old, his family moved to Tobermory, where he was educated. He later recalled, however, "The scholars of my day were thrashed if they spoke Gaelic in the school or it's [sic] environs."

When Livingstone was 16, his family moved to 126 Talisman Road in Glasgow. Duncan first became a clerk and then a stonemason's apprentice. When the Second Boer War broke out, he learned that the Laird of Torloisk was raising a cavalry regiment and immediately enlisted.

=== War and Peace ===
During combat against the Boer Commandos, Livingstone was shot through the ankle and returned, lamed, to Glasgow. At this time, he carved the inscription Tigh Mo Chridhe, Tigh Mo Gràidh ("House of My Heart, House of My Love") on the lintel of the main door of Saint Columba Church of Scotland on St. Vincent Street in Glasgow.

On 3 March 1903, Livingstone left Southampton on the S.S. Staffordshire on a voyage back to South Africa. He never returned to Scotland and was soon joined in South Africa by his brothers John and Alex. The three brothers briefly owned a house building company in Johannesburg, but disbanded their partnership and Duncan joined the Public Works Department. His brother John went on to prosper through gold mining, while Alex became a sugar cane farmer in Natal.

In 1911, Catriona (Katie) MacDonald, whose father owned the Torrans Farm and Kinloch Hotel near Pennyghael in Mull, and whose absence in Mull allegedly inspired Livingstone to write the Gaelic love song Muile nam Mòr-bheann ("Mull of the Mountains"), also emigrated to South Africa to become Livingstone's wife. Katie is further believed to be referred to in the dedication of Livingstone's 1940 poem Cogadh agus Sìth ("War and Peace"): Do an chaileag a dh'fhàg mise a dhol gu cogadh ("To the girl I left to go to war"). Duncan and Katie Livingstone were never to have children.

=== Later life ===
There was a lively community of Scottish Gaels in Pretoria when Livingstone first settled there and he, his wife, and both of his brothers were very active in both Scottish and Gaelic circles. Duncan and Alex Livingstone edited a Gaelic page in the Caledonian Society's journal. Duncan also founded the Celtic Society of Pretoria, a literary association consisting of forty members with Scottish, Irish, and Welsh origins. Duncan established a Celtic section in the State Library, Pretoria, which consisted, by 1954, of almost a thousand books.

Duncan Livingstone's poetry was doubtlessly assisted by the Gaelic broadcasts which he began making from South Africa for the BBC during the early 1930s. His first poem to be published was A fàgail Aifric in 1939. He published three other poems in Gaelic about the Second World War and also wrote a lament, in imitation of Sìleas na Ceapaich's iconic lament Alistair à Gleanna Garadh, for his nephew Pilot Officer Alasdair Ferguson Bruce of the RAF, who was shot down and killed during a mission over Germany in 1941.

Catriona died in September 1951 and Duncan, who adored her, never recovered from the blow. In response, he composed the poem Cràdh, which has since been dubbed, "a fine lament... for his wife."

He spent his retirement both writing and playing bowls.

Livingstone contemptuously mocked the collapse of the British Empire after World War II with the satirical Gaelic poem, Feasgar an Duine Ghil ("The Evening of the White Man"). In Dactylic hexameter lines similar to the odes of Friedrich Hölderlin, Livingstone argued that the Christian God had given the Europeans their colonies during the Scramble for Africa to elevate the quality of life for the native African population. Instead, European colonialists had been corrupted by the twin vices of pride and greed; and the rapidly escalating loss of their colonies after World War II was divine justice and retribution.

The rise of the National Party and its policy of Apartheid troubled Livingstone deeply. Livingstone's nephew, Prof. Ian Livingstone, recalls, "I visited Duncan (from Uganda) at his hotel (the Union Hotel, Pretoria) in 1959. He was resident there. Later, when I was back in Uganda, he sent me a long poem, in English (10 pages) on Sharpeville, where some 77 Africans had been shot dead by police (mostly in the back). This had obviously affected him greatly. Unfortunately, I don't have the copy anymore."

The Sharpeville massacre also inspired Livingstone to write the poem Bean Dubha' Caoidh a Fir a Chaidh a Marbhadh leis a' Phoiles ("A Black Woman Mourns her Husband Killed by the Police"), in a mixture of the Scottish Gaelic and Zulu languages.

== Death ==
He died in Pretoria on 25 May 1964 and lies buried in Rosetta Street Cemetery.

Duncan Livingstone left his books and papers to the State Library in Pretoria. A manuscript of 140 unpublished poems, mainly in Gaelic except for few verses in English and Scots, is preserved as MSB 579 in the National Library of South Africa in Cape Town. They also reveal that, similarly to his contemporary, South Uist poet and World War II veteran Dòmhnall Iain Dhonnchaidh, Duncan Livingstone made an English-Gaelic literary translation of Thomas Gray's Elegy in a Country Churchyard.

== Legacy ==
In a paper about The Gaelic Literature of Argyll, Donald E. Meek describes Livingstone as a, "very fine modern Gaelic poet", who, "wrote some splendidly prophetic verse on the twentieth-century challenges which were to confront white rule in South Africa. He thus has a claim to be included in any forthcoming survey of the Gaelic literature of Africa!"

In an essay, Scottish professor Wilson MacLeod described Duncan Livingstone as a "poet of significance", who became a perceptive critic of the British Empire, which was best illustrated by his attitude towards its collapse in Feasgar an Duine Ghil. MacLeod notes, however, that Livingstone's anti-colonialist attitude was rare among post-Culloden Gaelic poets, the vast majority of whom were "Pro-British and Pro-Empire", including Aonghas Moireasdan and Dòmhnall MacAoidh, who considered the expansion of the British Empire, "a civilizing mission rather than a process of conquest and expropriation". According to Wilson MacLeod, poetry composed by the Scottish Gaels did not until very recently draw the connections and parallels between their own experiences and those of other Colonized peoples throughout the world.
