= Maclean baronets =

Baronetcy in the Baronetage of the United Kingdom

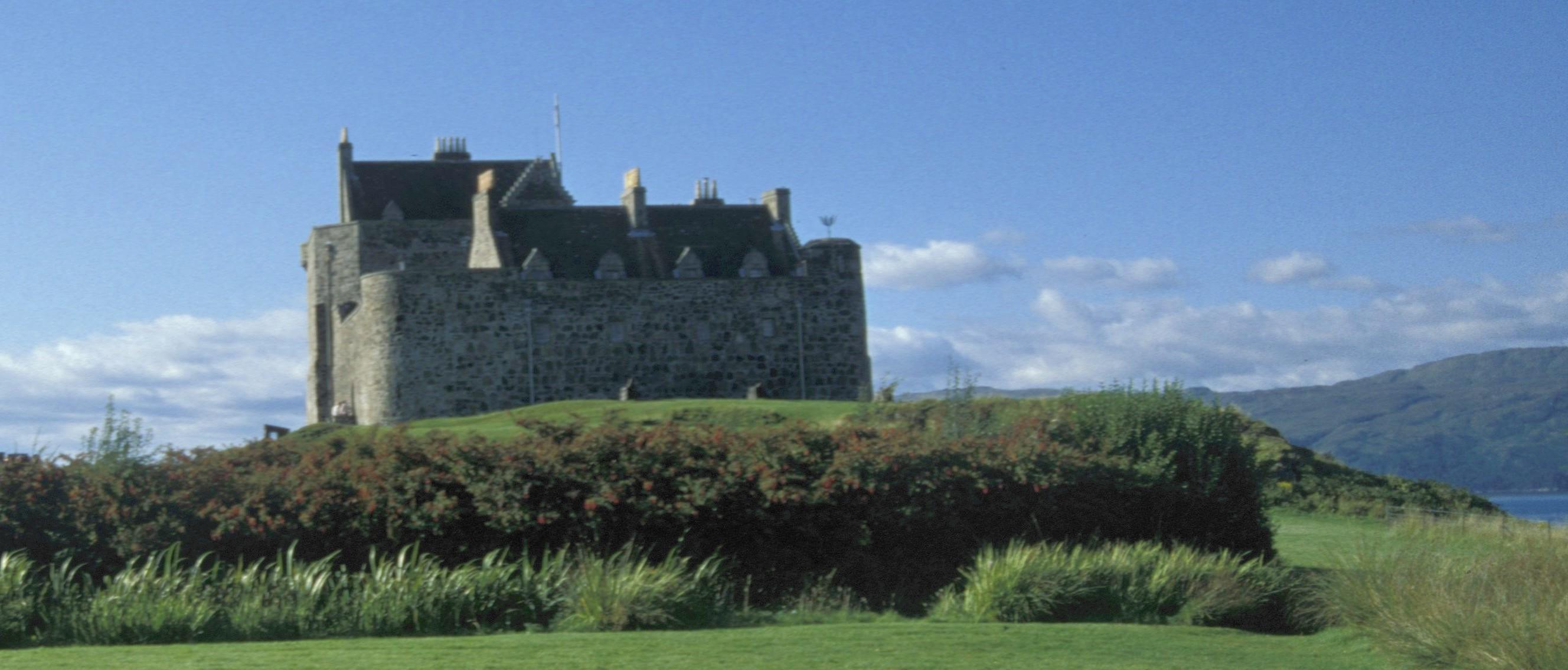
Duart Castle, the seat of the Maclean Baronets of Morvaren

There have been two baronetcies created for persons with the surname Maclean, one in the Baronetage of Nova Scotia and one in the Baronetage of the United Kingdom. Both creations are extant as of 2010.

The Maclean Baronetcy, of Morvaren (or Morvern) in the County of Argyll, was created in the Baronetage of Nova Scotia on 3 September 1631 for Lachlan Maclean, with remainder to his heirs male whatsoever. His great-grandson, the fifth Baronet, was raised to the Jacobite Peerage of Scotland as Lord Maclean on 17 December 1716. The line of the first Baronet failed on his death in circa 1751. The late Baronet was succeeded by his kinsman, the sixth Baronet. He was the great-grandson of Donald Maclean of Brolas. He was succeeded by his kinsman, the seventh Baronet. He was the grandson of Hector Og Maclean of Brolas, great-uncle of the sixth Baronet. He died unmarried and was succeeded by his half-brother, the eighth Baronet.

His great-great-grandson, the eleventh Baronet, served as Chief Scout of the Commonwealth, as Lord Lieutenant of Argyllshire and as Lord Chamberlain to Queen Elizabeth II. In 1971 he was created a life peer as Baron Maclean, of Duart and Morvern in the County of Argyll, in the Peerage of the United Kingdom. On his death in 1990 the life barony became extinct while he was succeeded in the baronetcy by his son, the twelfth and (as of 2010) present holder of the title. He is the 28th Chief of Clan Maclean of Duart. The ancestral seat of the Maclean baronets of Morvaren is Duart Castle on the Isle of Mull.

The Maclean Baronetcy, of Strachur and Glensluain in the County of Argyll, was created in the Baronetage of the United Kingdom on 22 July 1957 for the diplomat, soldier, writer and Conservative politician Fitzroy Maclean. As of 2010 the title is held by his son, the second Baronet, who succeeded in 1996.

== Maclean baronets of Duart and Morvern (or Dowart and Morvern) (1631) ==
coat of arms of the Maclean baronets of Duart and Morvern

- Sir Lachlan Maclean, 1st Baronet (died 1649)
- Sir Hector Maclean, 2nd Baronet (c. 1625–1651)
- Sir Allan Maclean, 3rd Baronet (c. 1637–1674)
- Sir John Maclean, 4th Baronet (died c. 1719)
- Sir Hector Maclean, 5th Baronet (c. 1704–1751)
- Sir Allan Maclean, 6th Baronet (died 1783)
- Sir Hector Maclean, 7th Baronet (died 1818)
- Sir Fitzroy Jeffreys Grafton Maclean, 8th Baronet (died 1847)
- Sir Charles Fitzroy Maclean, 9th Baronet (1798–1883)
- Sir Fitzroy Donald Maclean, 10th Baronet (1835–1936)
- Sir Charles Hector Fitzroy Maclean, 11th Baronet (1916–1990) (created Baron Maclean in 1971)
- Sir Lachlan Hector Charles Maclean, 12th Baronet (born 1942)

The heir apparent is the present holder's son, Malcolm Lachlan Charles Maclean, Younger of Duart and Morven (born 1972).

== Maclean baronets, of Strachur and Glensluain (1957) ==
Arms of the Maclean baronets of Strachur and Glensluain

- Sir Fitzroy Hew Maclean of Dunconnel, 1st Baronet (1911–1996)
- Sir Charles Edward Maclean of Dunconnel, 2nd Baronet (born 1946)
