= Fitzroy Maclean =

Fitzroy Maclean may refer to:

- Sir Fitzroy Maclean, 10th Baronet (1835–1936), Scottish clan chief
- Sir Fitzroy Maclean, 8th Baronet (1770–1847), Scottish clan chief
- Sir Fitzroy Maclean, 1st Baronet (1911–1996), Scottish diplomat, soldier, adventurer, author
