= Lord Lieutenant of Argyll and Bute =

Ceremonial officer in Argyll and Bute, Scotland

The Lord-Lieutenant of Argyll and Bute is the British monarch's personal representative for the Scottish council area of Argyll and Bute; the position was established in 1975, replacing the Lord Lieutenant of Argyllshire and the Lord Lieutenant of Buteshire in 1975.

The following have served as Lord-Lieutenant:

- Charles Hector Fitzroy Maclean of Duart, Baron Maclean 1975–1990
- John Crichton-Stuart, 6th Marquess of Bute 1990–1993
- Ian Campbell, 12th Duke of Argyll 1994–2001
- vacant
- Kenneth MacKinnon 2002–2011
- Patrick Loudon McIain Stewart 2011–25 July 2020
- Jane Margaret MacLeod 14 July 2020–
