= Sir Lachlan Maclean, 12th Baronet =

28th Scottish clan chief

The Honourable Sir Lachlan Maclean Bt CVO DL
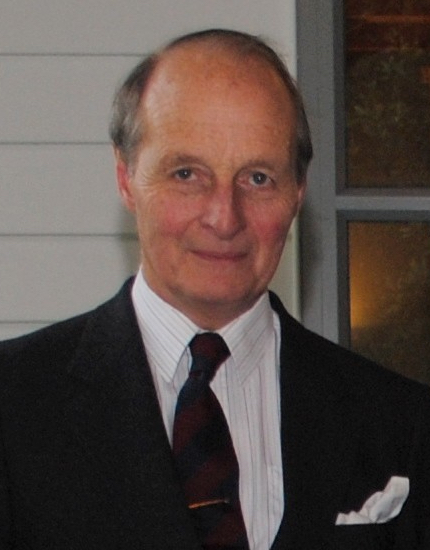
- Maclean in 2010

28th Clan Chief 12th Baronet 8th Lord Maclean
- In office 1990–present
- Preceded by: Charles Maclean, Baron Maclean, father

Personal details
- Born: Lachlan Hector Charles Maclean; 25 August 1942 (age 84)
- Spouses: Mary Helen Gordon (m. 1966; died 2007) Rosemary Matheson (m. 2010)
- Children: 5 (4 living)
- Education: Eton College

Sir Lachlan Hector Charles Maclean of Duart and Morven, 12th Baronet, CVO, DL (born 25 August 1942) is the 28th chief of Clan Maclean.

== Biography ==
Lachlan Hector Charles Maclean was born on 25 August 1942, the elder child of Charles Maclean (later created a life peer as Baron Maclean) and his wife, Elizabeth Mann. He was educated at Eton.

On 2 November 1966, he married Mary Helen Gordon (31 October 1943 – 30 December 2007), and the couple had five children. On the death of his father in 1990, he succeeded him as a Baronet of Nova Scotia and as Chief of the Name and Arms of Maclean. On 8 September 2010, he married Rosemary Matheson.

== Honours ==
- Adjutant, Royal Company of Archers.
- Commissioned Deputy Lieutenant of Argyll and Bute (1993).
- Commander of the Royal Victorian Order (1999).

== Issue ==
- Emma Mary Maclean (b. 1967)
- Sara Elizabeth Elen Maclean (1969–1971)
- Malcolm Lachlan Charles Maclean, Younger of Duart and Morven (b. 1972)
- Alexandra Caroline Maclean (b. 1975)
- Andrew William Maclean (b. 1979)

== Ancestry ==
Sir Lachlan Hector Charles Maclean's ancestors in three generations
Sir Lachlan Hector Charles Maclean, 12th Bt	Father: Charles Hector Fitzroy Maclean, Baron Maclean (1916–1990)	Paternal Grandfather: Hector Fitzroy Maclean (1873–1932)	Paternal Great-Grandfather: Sir Fitzroy Maclean, 10th Baronet
Sir Lachlan Hector Charles Maclean, 12th Bt	Father: Charles Hector Fitzroy Maclean, Baron Maclean (1916–1990)	Paternal Grandfather: Hector Fitzroy Maclean (1873–1932)	Paternal Great-grandmother:
Sir Lachlan Hector Charles Maclean, 12th Bt	Father: Charles Hector Fitzroy Maclean, Baron Maclean (1916–1990)	Paternal Grandmother: Winifred Joan Wilding (d. 1941)	Paternal Great-Grandfather: John Hodgkiss Wilding
Sir Lachlan Hector Charles Maclean, 12th Bt	Father: Charles Hector Fitzroy Maclean, Baron Maclean (1916–1990)	Paternal Grandmother: Winifred Joan Wilding (d. 1941)	Paternal Great-Grandmother:
Sir Lachlan Hector Charles Maclean, 12th Bt	Mother: (Joan) Elizabeth Mann	Maternal Grandfather: Francis Thomas Mann	Maternal Great-Grandfather:
Sir Lachlan Hector Charles Maclean, 12th Bt	Mother: (Joan) Elizabeth Mann	Maternal Grandfather: Francis Thomas Mann	Maternal Great-Grandmother:
Sir Lachlan Hector Charles Maclean, 12th Bt	Mother: (Joan) Elizabeth Mann	Maternal Grandmother:	Maternal Great-grandfather:
Sir Lachlan Hector Charles Maclean, 12th Bt	Mother: (Joan) Elizabeth Mann	Maternal Grandmother:	Maternal Great-Grandmother:

== Heraldry ==
Coat of arms of Sir Lachlan Maclean, 12th Baronet
Notes The quartering of the lymphad, embattled tower, salmon, and eagles' heads are characteristic of west highland heraldry. It has been suggested that the eagles' heads may represent the hawks which Maclean chiefs supplied to kings of Scots on certain occasions. The rock may represent Cairnburgh, in the Treshnish Isles. Crest A tower embattled argent. Escutcheon Quarterly, 1st. argent, a rock gules, 2nd, argent, a dexter hand fessewise couped gules holding a cross-crosslet fitchée in pale azure, 3rd, Or, a lymphad, oars in saltire, and sails furled, sable, flagged gules, 4th argent, a salmon naiant proper, in chief two eagles' heads respectant gules. Supporters Dexter, A seal proper. Sinister, an ostrich with a horseshoe in its beak proper. Motto Virtue mine honour.

Baronetage of Nova Scotia
Preceded by Charles Maclean	Baronet (of Duart and Morvern); 1990 – present	Incumbent; Heir Apparent: Malcolm Lachlan Charles Maclean
