= Ken McKinnon =

Ken McKinnon may refer to:

- Ken McKinnon (academic administrator)
- Ken McKinnon (politician)

== See also ==
- Ken MacKinnon, British linguist
