= Al McLean =

Al McLean may refer to:

- Al McLean (politician)
- Al McLean (baseball)
- Al McLean (ice hockey)

== See also ==
- Allan McLean (disambiguation)
