= Laird of Brolas =

The Laird of Brolas owned the estate at Taynuilt in Argyll and Bute, Scotland.

- Donald Maclean, 1st Laird of Brolas, son of Hector Og Maclean, 15th Chief
- Lauchlan Maclean, 2nd Laird of Brolas
- Donald Maclean, 3rd Laird of Brolas
- Sir Allan Maclean, 4th Laird of Brolas, who became Sir Allan Maclean, 6th Baronet and the 22nd Clan Chief

Other clan members include:

- John Maclean of Brolas was a Scottish member of Clan Maclean who was the grandfather of Sir Hector Maclean, 7th Baronet. Donald married a second time and had Sir Fitzroy Jeffreys Grafton Maclean, 8th Baronet. John Maclean of Brolas married Finovia of Garmony then had as his son, Donald Maclean of Brolas who married and had Sir Hector Maclean, 7th Baronet. Donald married a second time and had Sir Fitzroy Jeffreys Grafton Maclean, 8th Baronet.
