= Don McLean (disambiguation) =

Don McLean (born 1945) is an American folk singer-songwriter.

Don McLean, Maclean or MacLean may also refer to:

- Don McLean (album), released 1972
- Don MacLean (basketball) (born 1970), American former basketball player
- Don McLean (ice hockey, born 1926) (1926–2009), Canadian ice hockey player
- Don McLean (ice hockey, born 1954), Canadian retired hockey player
- Donald MacLean (ice hockey) (born 1977), Canadian ice hockey forward
- Don Maclean (born 1944), British TV comedian
- Don Seymour McLean (1938–1984), American drag performer known as Lori Shannon
- Don-E, born Donald McLean, British soul musician

== See also ==
- Donald Maclean (disambiguation)
