= William Erskine Thomson =

Scottish architect, 1875–1962

- Born: 23 February 1875; Edinburgh, Scotland
- Died: 13 April 1962 (aged 87); Dundee, Scotland
- Occupation: Architect
- Awards: FRIBA

William Erskine Thomson (23 February 1875 – 13 April 1962) was a Scottish architect prominent in the late 19th and first half of the 20th centuries. He designed several notable buildings in Scotland, mostly including churches and villas. Several of his works are now listed structures.

== Early life ==
Thomson was born in Edinburgh in 1875, the son of William, a wine and spirit merchant, and Margaret.

== Career ==
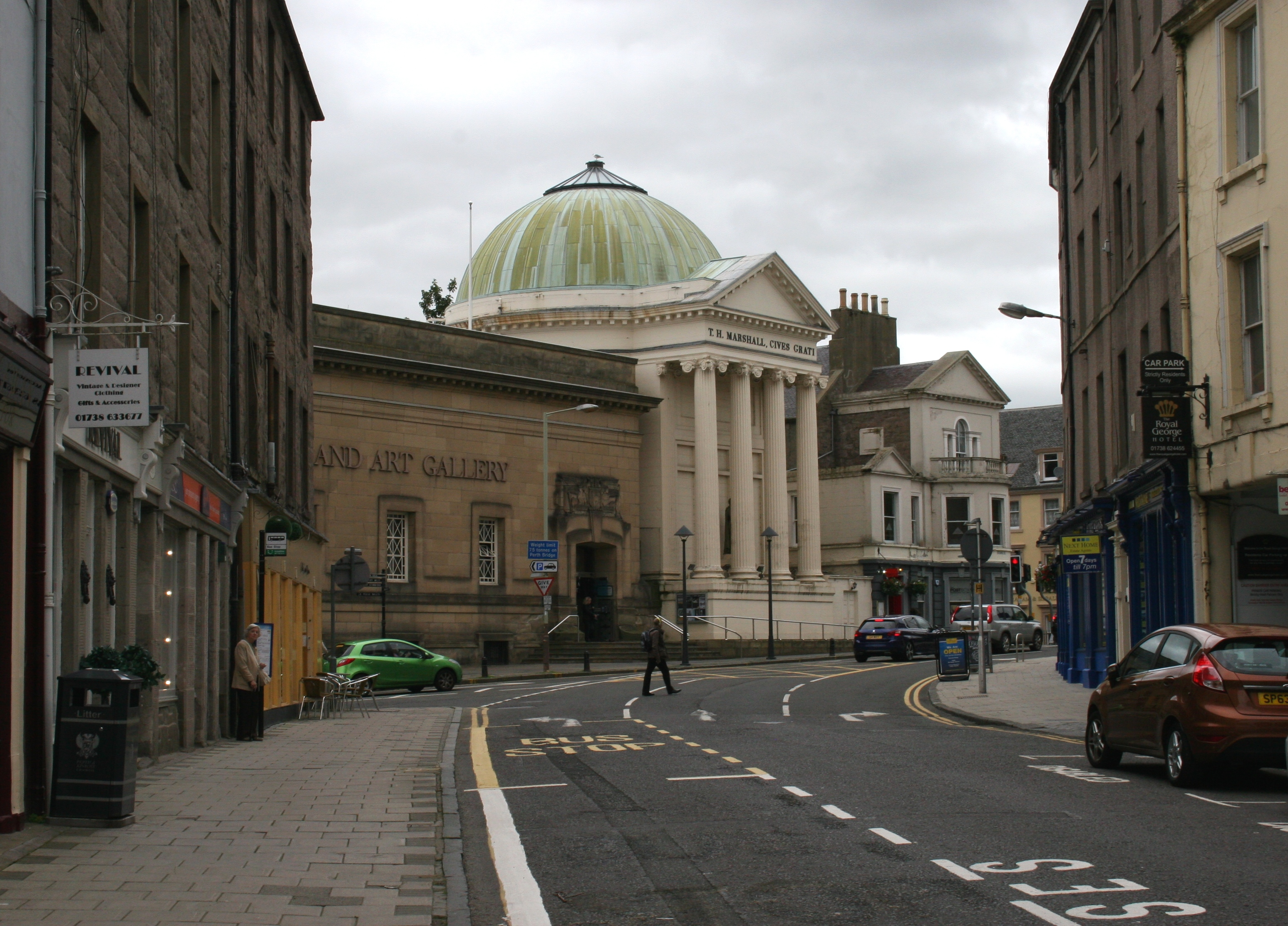
A view north from in front of Thomson's former practice at 36 George Street in Perth. Only the Thomas Hay Marshall monument section of Perth Museum and Art Gallery existed at the time; the southern portion was added in the 1930s

In November 1891, he was articled to Peter Lyle Barclay Henderson, with whose practice he remained for just over five years. While there, he attended Edinburgh School of Art and Heriot-Watt College.

Just before he turned 22 years old, he joined Ayr architects J. & H. V. Eaglesham as an assistant. Twelve months later, he moved to Perth to join Maclaren & Mackay. He later became their chief draughtsman.

It was in Perth that he began his own practice, at 5 St John Street, in the shadow of the ancient St John's Kirk, in December 1909. He entered the competition to design Perth City Hall in 1911, but he was not successful. In 1923, his offices moved to 36 George Street. Around the same time, he went into partnership with John Guthrie Lornie Glass. Glass continued the practice after Thomson's death.

=== Selected notable works ===
- St Leonard's Church, Perth (1921; decoration and furniture) – now Category B listed
- Bridgend War Memorial, Aberfeldy (1922) – now Category C listed
- Waverley Hotel, Inverness (1937; extension) – now Category C listed
- Free Presbyterian Church, Perth (1938) – now Category C listed

== Personal life ==
Thomson joined the Dundee Institute of Architects in 1911. In 1932, he was elected a fellow of the Royal Institute of British Architects (RIBA). His nominators were Donald Alexander Stewart and Robert Matthew Mitchell of Perth and William Salmond of Dundee. Thomson also served on the RIBA council for a period.

Thomson retired in 1954, aged about 80.

== Death ==
Thomson died at 11 Barossa Place in Dundee in 1962, aged 87. He had been living in Blackfriars Street, Perth, behind Atholl Crescent.
