= 114th Regiment of Foot (Royal Highlander Volunteers) =

British Army infantry unit

The 114th Regiment of Foot (Royal Highlander Volunteers) was an infantry regiment of the British Army from 1761 to 1763. It was raised in October 1761, with six companies, by Sir Allan MacLean of Torloisk. He was commissioned lieutenant in the 60th Foot Royal Americans at the beginning of the Seven Years' War and was severely wounded at Ticonderoga in 1758. He was then given one of the four NY Independent Companies until he returned to Scotland where he raised the 114th Maclean's Highlanders, or the Royal Highland Volunteers, as their Major Commandant. The regiment was disbanded in 1763.

== Uniform ==
The regiment wore red coats with blue facings, which was the same as the 42nd Regiment of Foot (Black Watch).
