= Allan Maclean, 10th Laird of Ardgour =

Allan Maclean, 10th of Ardgour (1668-1756) was a Scottish laird, chieftain of the junior Ardgour branch of Clan Maclean.

== Biography ==
He was born in 1668 to Ewen Maclean, 9th Laird of Ardgour and Mary, daughter of Lachlan Maclean of Lochbuie. His siblings were Donald, Charles, John, and Lachlan.

He had the misfortune of being the representative of the family in evil times, on which account he and his tribe in a more especial manner were persecuted for depredations committed not only by them, but for the deeds of other clans also. In 1685 an indemnity for their past offenses was procured by Torloisk at London, but as Torloisk died soon after his return, no one knew it was in his custody until afterward accidentally discovered. While it was dormant Ardgour was judged and obliged to borrow sums of money by mortgaging considerable portions of his estate to pay these debts, which, together with other additional burdens added and contracted through misfortunes and mismanagement on his own as well as his son Donald's part, the estate sunk so low, that it was thought to be in a desperate condition. When the affairs reached their lowest point, Hector Maclean, 4th Laird of Coll, Donald Maclean, 5th Laird of Torloisk, John MacLean, minister in Kilninan, and Archibald MacLean, minister in the Ross of Mull, took upon themselves the management of the estate, and after passing through much trouble and changes, appointed Donald Cameron of Strontin superintendent under them. Cameron continued a few years, went to Edinburgh, took a ship at Leith, and never was heard of afterward. The management of the estate fell back again into the hands of the trustees, and in a tottering condition continued for many years. On the death of the eldest son Donald, in 1731, Allan made over the estate to John, then the oldest living son, after which John continued the management under the trustees. Allan reserved for himself a small yearly portion.

== Marriage ==
He married Anne, daughter of Sir Ewen Cameron of Lochiel, and had issue:

- Donald, Ewen, John, 11th Laird of Ardgour, Archibald, Allan, James, Isabella, Margaret, and Mary Maclean

Donald never married; Ewen died comparatively young, on his way from Virginia, where he had been engaged in mercantile pursuits; Archibald died unmarried; Allan emigrated to Georgia, and died there; James was a lieutenant in Montgomery's Highlanders, and was killed at sea in an action with a privateer on June 1, 1767; Isabella married Donald Maclean, 3rd Laird of Brolas; Margaret married Angus MacLean of Kinlochaline; and Mary married John, son of Charles MacLean of Kinlochaline.

Allan died in 1756, in the eighty-eighth year of his age.
