= Our Lady of the Isles =

Sculpture on South Uist, Outer Hebrides, Scotland

Coordinates: 57.342731°N 7.360725°W

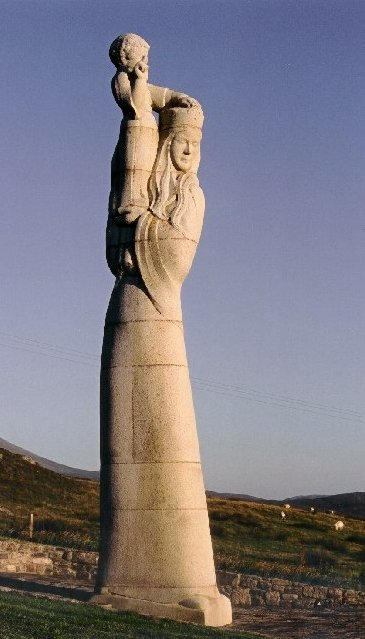
Our Lady of the Isles

Our Lady of the Isles (Gaelic: Moire ro Naomh nan Eilean or Bana Thighearna nan Eilean) is a sculpture of the Madonna and Child, on South Uist in the Outer Hebrides of Scotland.

The statue is situated on the western slopes of Ruabhal, a hill near the northern end of South Uist. It is to the east of the A865 road, and a paved path runs from the road to the statue.

The statue was commissioned following proposals from the Ministry of Defence for a large missile testing range. This would have covered much of Uist, and involved construction of a military town as well as facilities for building missiles. This caused concern it would destroy much of the island's way of life, culture and language. Resistance to the proposals was led by Canon John Morrison, the local parish priest, whose opposition to the range earned him the nickname "Father Rocket".

Morrison both commissioned and raised funds for the construction of the statue, which was designed by Hew Lorimer, and sculpted from granite. The statue was completed in 1957, and dedicated in 1958.

After visiting South Uist during the research for his 2004 book The Last of the Celts, Marcus Tanner described the statue as one of the only visible proofs that visitors driving across South Uist, where most of the population remained members of the Catholic Church, have left the Scottish Presbyterianism of John Knox behind.

In 2007 the statue was listed as a Category B listed building.

== Literature ==
The 1958 dedication of the statue and the instrumental role played in the project by Morrison were commemorated by South Uist poet Dòmhnall Iain Dhonnchaidh in his poem Laoidh Statue Ruaidheabhal ("The Statue at Rueval").
