= Peter Lyle Barclay Henderson =

Scottish architect (1848–1912)

- Born: 1848; Edinburgh, Scotland
- Died: 6 February 1912 (aged 63–64); Colinton, Scotland
- Occupation: Architect
- Awards: FRIBA

Peter Lyle Barclay Henderson (1848 – 6 February 1912) was a Scottish architect prominent in the late 19th and early 20th centuries. He designed several notable buildings in Scotland, mostly breweries and private residences. Several of his works are now listed structures.

== Early life ==
Barclay was born in Edinburgh in 1848, to Barclay Henderson and Mary Lyle. His father was an engineer at Edinburgh Gas Light Company.

== Career ==
He studied at Moray House, alongside having private tuition. In 1863, aged 16, he was articled to architects and civil engineers Charles Leadbetter and James W. Smith. He also continued his studies, now at the Edinburgh School of Arts.

In 1873, he set up his own practice at 21 Oxford Street in Edinburgh.

His pupils from 1886 onwards included Alexander Lorne Campbell, William Erskine Thomson and John Wilson Paterson.

=== Notable works ===
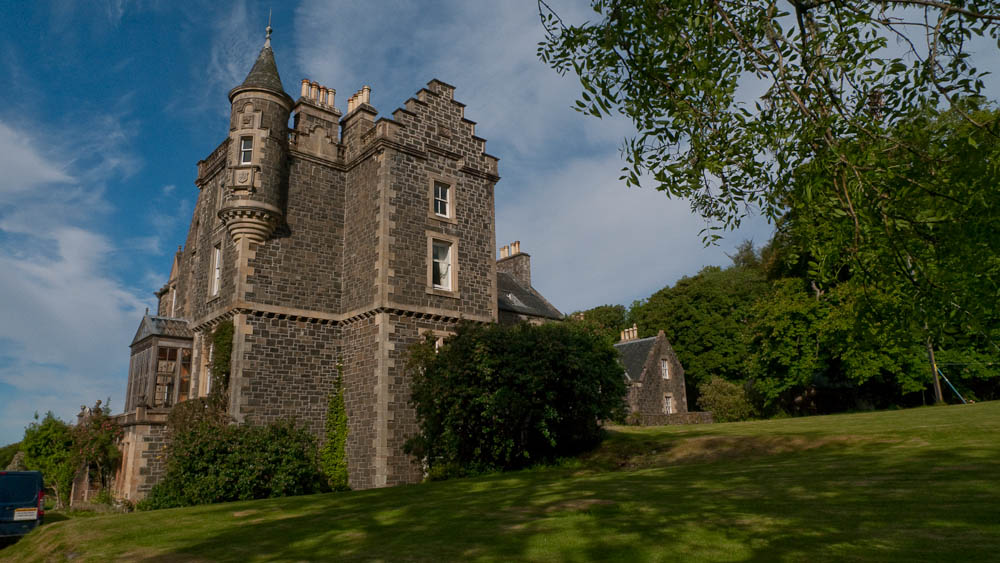
Torloisk House

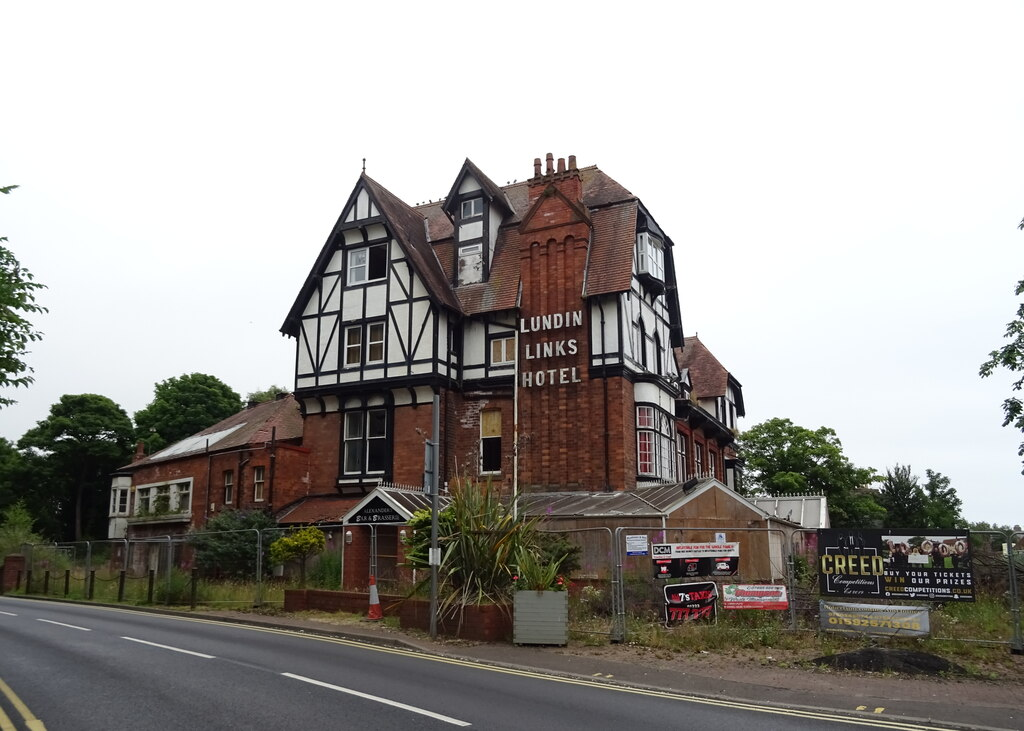
Lundin Links Hotel (2021)

Henderson was involved in the designing of the following structures:

- Torloisk House, Isle of Mull (1880)
- Slatefield Brewery, Glasgow (1881)
- Viewfield Baptist Church, Dunfermline (1882)
- Glendouglas House, Lanarkshire (1882)
- Crown Brewery, Glasgow (1882)
- Wholesale Meat Market, Edinburgh (1883)
- Prestonpans Brewery, Prestonpans (1884)
- Old Abbey Tavern, Edinburgh (c. 1885)
- Bull's Close, The Canongate, Edinburgh (1886)
- Murray's Craigmillar Park Brewery and cottages, Edinburgh (1888)
- Sidegate Brewery, Haddington (1893)
- Thornbush Brewery, Inverness (1897)
- Lundin Links Hotel, Lundin Links (1900) – Category C listed prior to its destruction from a fire in 2024

== Personal life ==
Barclay married Helen Smart in 1875. They had at least five children (one son and three daughters).

He was admitted as a Fellow of the Royal Institute of British Architects in 1906, having been proposed by Hippolyte Jean Blanc, James Macintyre Henry and Colin B. Cownie.

For three years, Barclay was moderator of Edinburgh High Constables, as well as being a member of the Merchant Company. He was also a 31st Degree Mason, serving for three years as Right Worshipful Master of the Lodge of Edinburgh.

== Death ==
Henderson, then a widower, died in the Edinburgh suburb of Colinton in 1912, aged 63 or 64.
