= Sir Hector Maclean, 7th Baronet =

Sir Hector Maclean, 7th Baronet, 3rd Lord Maclean and 23rd Clan Chief

23rd Clan Chief 7th Baronet 3rd Lord Maclean
- In office 1783-1818
- Preceded by: Sir Allan Maclean, 6th Baronet, cousin
- Succeeded by: Sir Fitzroy Jeffreys Grafton Maclean, 8th Baronet, half brother

Personal details
- Born: Hector Maclean about 1760
- Died: 2 November 1818 (aged 58); Halfield, Yorkshire
- Parent: Donald Maclean of Brolas
- Relatives: Sir Fitzroy Jeffreys Grafton Maclean, 8th Baronet, half brother Donald MacLean, 1st Laird of Brolas, 2nd great grandfather

Sir Hector Maclean, 7th Baronet of Morvern (about 1760 – 2 November 1818) was the 23rd Clan Chief of Clan Maclean who died before he had any children. The title was then passed to his half brother.

== Biography ==
He was born in 1783 to Donald Maclean of Brolas. Donald Maclean of Brolas was the great-grandson of Donald MacLean, 1st Laird of Brolas. Sir Hector became the 23rd Clan Chief of Clan Maclean on the death of Sir Allan Maclean, 6th Baronet, who died without an heir. Early in his life, Sir Hector served in the army, but he spent the majority of his life living a retired lifestyle.

He died without an heir on 2 November 1818, and was succeeded as Clan Chief by his half brother, Sir Fitzroy Jeffreys Grafton Maclean, 8th Baronet.

== Ancestors ==
Sir Hector Maclean, 7th Baronet's ancestors in three generations
Sir Hector Maclean, 7th Baronet	Father: Donald Maclean of Brolas	Paternal Grandfather: John Maclean of Brolas	Paternal Great-Grandfather: Hector Og Maclean of Brolas
Sir Hector Maclean, 7th Baronet	Father: Donald Maclean of Brolas	Paternal Grandfather: John Maclean of Brolas	Paternal Great-grandmother: Jeanette MacNeil of Barra
Sir Hector Maclean, 7th Baronet	Father: Donald Maclean of Brolas	Paternal Grandmother: Finovia of Garmony	Paternal Great-Grandfather:
Sir Hector Maclean, 7th Baronet	Father: Donald Maclean of Brolas	Paternal Grandmother: Finovia of Garmony	Paternal Great-Grandmother:
Sir Hector Maclean, 7th Baronet	Mother: Mary Dickson of Glasgow	Maternal Grandfather: John Dickson of Glasgow	Maternal Great-Grandfather:
Sir Hector Maclean, 7th Baronet	Mother: Mary Dickson of Glasgow	Maternal Grandfather: John Dickson of Glasgow	Maternal Great-Grandmother:
Sir Hector Maclean, 7th Baronet	Mother: Mary Dickson of Glasgow	Maternal Grandmother:	Maternal Great-grandfather:
Sir Hector Maclean, 7th Baronet	Mother: Mary Dickson of Glasgow	Maternal Grandmother:	Maternal Great-Grandmother:

Baronetage of Nova Scotia
Preceded by Allan Maclean	Baronet (of Duart and Morvern); 1783–1818	Succeeded by Fitzroy Maclean
