= Sir John Maclean, 4th Baronet =

Scottish clan chief

20th Clan Chief 16th Laird of Duart 4th Baronet
- In office 1674–1716
- Preceded by: Sir Allan Maclean, 3rd Baronet, father
- Succeeded by: Sir Hector Maclean, 5th Baronet, son

Personal details
- Born: John Maclean; 1670
- Died: March 1716 (age 46)
- Children: Sir Hector Maclean, 5th Baronet, Katherine Maclean
- Parent: Sir Allan Maclean, 3rd Baronet (father)

Sir John Maclean, 4th Baronet of Duart and Morvern (1670–1716) was the 20th Clan Chief of Clan Maclean from 1674 to 1716. He was the 16th and last Laird of Duart, when in 1691 he lost Castle Duart to Archibald Campbell, 1st Duke of Argyll. The castle wasn't recovered by Clan Maclean until 1912 until it was purchased by Fitzroy Donald Maclean, 221 years later.

== Biography ==
He was born in 1670. He became chief at the death of his father, Sir Allan Maclean, 3rd Baronet, in 1674, when he was four years old. Lauchlan Maclean, 2nd Laird of Brolas, and Lachlan Maclean, 3rd Laird of Torloisk were assigned as his legal guardians. In 1691 Castle Duart was under siege by Archibald Campbell, 1st Duke of Argyll, and Maclean was forced to surrender it.

He commanded the right wing of the Jacobite army at Battle of Killiecrankie, and held out in Cairnburgh Castle, which straddles Cairn na Burgh Mòr and Cairn na Burgh Beag. In 1692 he made his peace with William III of England. He afterwards went to France and remained at the Château de Saint-Germain-en-Laye until the Act of Indemnity 1703, when he returned to Scotland. He joined John Erskine, 6th Earl of Mar in the Battle of Sheriffmuir, and after retired to Gordon Castle where he died in March 1716.

== Marriage and children ==
He married Mary, daughter of Sir Aeneas Macpherson of Invereshie and had:

- Sir Hector Maclean, 5th Baronet
- Katherine Maclean

== Ancestors ==
Sir John Maclean, 4th Baronet's ancestors in three generations
| Sir John Maclean, 4th Baronet | Father: Sir Allan Maclean, 3rd Baronet | Paternal Grandfather: Sir Lachlan Maclean, 1st Baronet | Paternal Great-Grandfather: Hector Mor Maclean |
| Sir John Maclean, 4th Baronet | Father: Sir Allan Maclean, 3rd Baronet | Paternal Grandfather: Sir Lachlan Maclean, 1st Baronet | Paternal Great-grandmother: |
| Sir John Maclean, 4th Baronet | Father: Sir Allan Maclean, 3rd Baronet | Paternal Grandmother: Mary MacLeod | Paternal Great-Grandfather: Sir Roderick MacLeod |
| Sir John Maclean, 4th Baronet | Father: Sir Allan Maclean, 3rd Baronet | Paternal Grandmother: Mary MacLeod | Paternal Great-Grandmother: |
| Sir John Maclean, 4th Baronet | Mother: Juliana MacLeod of MacLeod | Maternal Grandfather: | Maternal Great-Grandfather: |
| Sir John Maclean, 4th Baronet | Mother: Juliana MacLeod of MacLeod | Maternal Grandfather: | Maternal Great-Grandmother: |
| Sir John Maclean, 4th Baronet | Mother: Juliana MacLeod of MacLeod | Maternal Grandmother: | Maternal Great-grandfather: |
| Sir John Maclean, 4th Baronet | Mother: Juliana MacLeod of MacLeod | Maternal Grandmother: | Maternal Great-Grandmother: |

Baronetage of Nova Scotia
| Preceded by Allan Maclean | Baronet (of Duart and Morvern); 1674–1716 | Succeeded by Hector Maclean |
