= Torloisk House =

House in Argyll and Bute, Scotland

Coordinates: 56°31′57″N 6°12′46″W

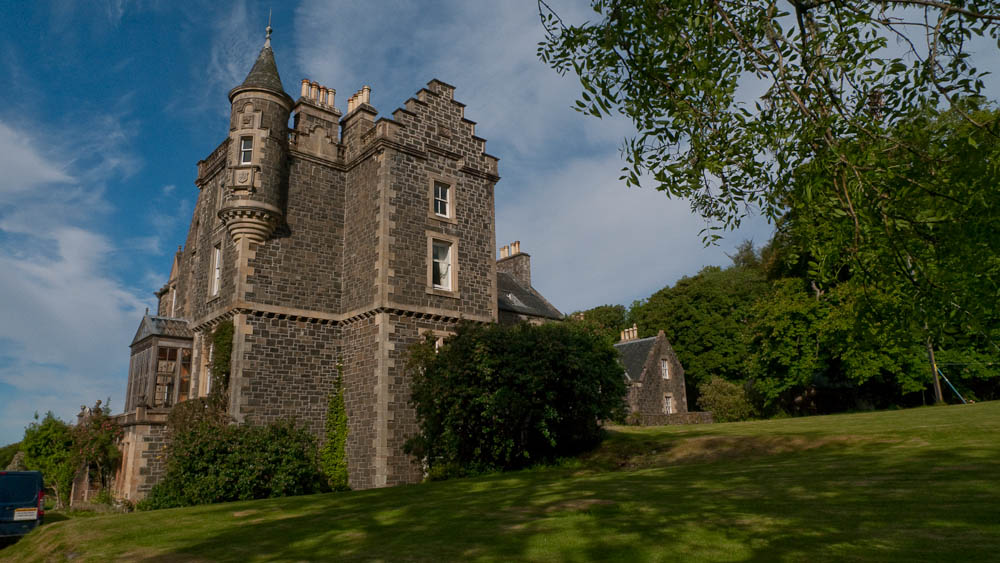

Torloisk House (sometimes referred to as Torluck House in 19th century references) on the Isle of Mull, Argyll and Bute, Scotland, was the family seat held by the Macleans of Torloisk. The house is protected as a Category B listed building.

== History ==
In April 1588, Jonet Campbell was married at Torloisk and her son Lachlan Mor Maclean used the opportunity to revenge himself on his new stepfather John MacKane and some of the wedding guests.

The family seat is located on the Mull side of Loch Tua, and is known as Torloisk House.

This branch is descended from
I. Lachlan Og, First MacLean of Torloisk.

Second son of Sir Lachlan Mor Maclean. He received from his father a charter of the lands of Lehire-Torloisk, forfeited by the son of Ailean nan Sop, which was afterward confirmed by royal grant. He was present at the Battle of Gruinnart, and was severely wounded. He was a witness to a charter given by his father to Martin MacGillivray of Pennyghael, and subscribed himself in the Irish characters, Mise Lachin Mhac Gilleoin. He was an important man in his day, and was so influential that he was compelled to make his appearance before the privy council.

Torloisk House (and Torloisk Estate) as they now exist are the result of alterations and additions made under the ownership of Admiral William Compton, 4th Marquess of Northampton. The architect of the changes was Peter Lyle Barclay Henderson.

Lachlan Maclean built the original Georgian part to today's house in the 1770s, with money he had made from the kelp industry in the 18th century. Kelp was used as fertilizer and smelted to make iodine. The house was a charming, white coloured, well proportioned house (Wilmena de Normann's water colour painting of it is in the library). It remained so for almost 100 years until Lord William Compton inherited. ... William was a naval officer by profession and rose to the rank of Admiral.

== Pyromania ==
There was an unusual case of pyromania at Torloisk House in the year 1848.

On Sunday, the 11th of November, the curtains of a bed were ignited, as was supposed, by lightning; a window-blind followed; and immediately afterwards the curtains of five rooms broke out one after another into a flame; even the towels hanging up in the kitchen were burnt. The next day a bed took fire, and it being thought advisable to carry the bed-linen into the coach-house for safety, it caught fire three or four times during the process of removal. In a few days the phenomenon was renewed. The furniture, books, and everything else of an inflammable nature were, with much labour, taken from the mansion, and again some body-linen burst into a flame on the way. Even after these precautions had been taken, and persons had been set to watch in every part of the house, the mysterious fires continued to haunt it until the 22nd of February, 1849. It was suspected from the first that they were the work of an incendiary, and upon a rigid examination of the household before the Fiscal-General and the Sheriff the mischief was traced to the daughter of the housekeeper, a young girl, who was on a visit to her mother. She had effected her purpose, which was perfectly motiveless, by concealing combustibles in different parts of the house.
