= Sir Hector Maclean, 5th Baronet =

21st Clan Chief 5th Baronet 1st Lord Maclean of Scotland
- In office 1716-1750
- Preceded by: Sir John Maclean, 4th Baronet, father
- Succeeded by: Sir Allan Maclean, 6th Baronet, third cousin

Personal details
- Born: Hector Maclean circa 1700
- Died: 1750 or 1751
- Spouse(s): Mary, daughter of Sir Aeneas Macpherson of Invereshie
- Parent: Sir John Maclean, 4th Baronet

Sir Hector Maclean, 5th Baronet of Morvern (c. 1700–1750/1751) was the 21st Clan Chief of Clan Maclean from 1716 to 1750. He was raised to the Jacobite Peerage of Scotland as Lord Maclean on 17 December 1716, a title to pass on his male heirs.

== Biography ==
He was the son of Sir John Maclean, 4th Baronet and Mary, daughter of Sir Aeneas Macpherson of Invereshie. He succeeded Sir John when he died in 1716. His territories were said to include the small western isles of Eigg, Muck, Coll and Tiree.

In December 1744, he sent a petition to Charles Edward Stuart on behalf of Jacobite intervention. The petition was important in helping persuade the Prince to launch his invasion on Scotland. Sir Hector had written that some 5,000 officers and men from nearby clans were loyal to the Stuart cause.

In June 1745 he was in Edinburgh, and he was immediately arrested, together with his servant, on the charge of being in the French service and of enlisting men for it. He was sent to the Tower of London, where he remained until liberated by the Indemnity Act 1747 (20 Geo. 2. c. 52).

He died unmarried and without children in Paris, France in January or February 1751. He was succeeded as Clan Chief by his third cousin, Sir Allan Maclean, 6th Baronet.

Sir Hector Maclean, 5th Baronet's ancestors in three generations
Sir Hector Maclean, 5th Baronet	Father: Sir John Maclean, 4th Baronet	Paternal Grandfather: Sir Allan Maclean, 3rd Baronet	Paternal Great-Grandfather: Sir Hector Maclean, 2nd Baronet
Sir Hector Maclean, 5th Baronet	Father: Sir John Maclean, 4th Baronet	Paternal Grandfather: Sir Allan Maclean, 3rd Baronet	Paternal Great-grandmother:
Sir Hector Maclean, 5th Baronet	Father: Sir John Maclean, 4th Baronet	Paternal Grandmother:	Paternal Great-Grandfather:
Sir Hector Maclean, 5th Baronet	Father: Sir John Maclean, 4th Baronet	Paternal Grandmother:	Paternal Great-Grandmother:
Sir Hector Maclean, 5th Baronet	Mother: Mary Macpherson of Invereshie	Maternal Grandfather: Sir Aeneas Macpherson of Invereshie	Maternal Great-Grandfather:
Sir Hector Maclean, 5th Baronet	Mother: Mary Macpherson of Invereshie	Maternal Grandfather: Sir Aeneas Macpherson of Invereshie	Maternal Great-Grandmother:
Sir Hector Maclean, 5th Baronet	Mother: Mary Macpherson of Invereshie	Maternal Grandmother:	Maternal Great-grandfather:
Sir Hector Maclean, 5th Baronet	Mother: Mary Macpherson of Invereshie	Maternal Grandmother:	Maternal Great-Grandmother:

Peerage of Scotland
New creation	— TITULAR — Lord Maclean; Jacobite peerage 1716–1751	Succeeded by Allan Maclean
Baronetage of Nova Scotia
Preceded by John Maclean	Baronet (of Duart and Morvern); 1716–1751	Succeeded by Allan Maclean
