= Dòmhnall Iain Dhonnchaidh =

Scottish war poet, philosopher, and folklorist

Donald John MacDonald, (Scottish Gaelic: Dòmhnall Iain Dhonnchaidh) (lit. "Donald Ian Duncan", fig. "Donald Ian, son of Duncan") legally Dòmhnaill Iain MacDhòmhnaill (7 February 1919 in Peninerine, South Uist, Scotland – 2 October 1986 in Glasgow, Scotland) was a Scottish war poet, philosopher, and folklorist.

According to his friend and editor Bill Innes, "Apart from the war years incarcerated in a German prisoner-of-war camp, he spent his life on the island of South Uist. Yet he was to evolve out of the Bardic tradition into a poet who deserves to rank with the greatest that Gaelic has known".

== Early life ==
Dòmhnaill Iain MacDhòmhnaill was born, the third of four children, in a croft at Peninerine on 7 February 1919. His father was the famous Seanchaidh Duncan MacDonald (Scottish Gaelic: Donnchaidh mac Dhòmhnaill 'ac Donnchaidh), who was originally from Snishival, but who traced his lineage back via North Uist to the Isle of Skye, and to the MacRury official bards to the Chiefs of Clan MacDonald of Sleat. Among folklorists and Celticists, however, Duncan Macdonald was often referred to, after his occupation, as (Scottish Gaelic: Donnchadh Clachair) (lit. "Duncan the Stonemason").

Through his mother, Margaret (née MacIntyre), the future poet was the nephew of the poet Donald MacIntyre (Scottish Gaelic: Dòmhnaill Ruadh Phàislig) and the great-grandson of Angus Maclean (Scottish Gaelic: Am Pìobaire Bàn). Through his North Uist ancestors, Dòmhnall was a cousin of World War I soldier poet Dòmhnall Ruadh Chorùna (1887-1967), whose war poetry heavily influenced his own and about whom Dòmhnall later composed an iconic Gaelic eulogy.

In addition to his immediate and extended family's encyclopedic knowledge of local history, as well as of Hebridean mythology and folklore, Dòmhnall grew up immersed in familial poetry recitations that ran the whole gamut of the great works from the poetic canon of Scottish Gaelic literature, whose poets influenced his later work. Due to his familial connections to North Uist, the poetry of Iain Mac Fhearchair, the 18th-century Chief Bard to the Chief of Clan MacDonald of Sleat, was routinely sung and recited and became Dòmhnall Iain's most important early influence. Dòmhnall also grew up, however, constantly hearing the poetry of Iain Lom, Alasdair mac Mhaighstir Alasdair, Duncan Ban MacIntyre, and Màiri nighean Alasdair Ruaidh.

Of translating his late friend's poetry for a bilingual complete works, Bill Innes has written, "Where Dwelly's dictionary failed, Allan MacDonald's Gaelic Words and Expressions from South Uist and Eriskay and the vocabulary to Donald MacIntyre's Sporan Dhòmhnaill were often invaluable, but some words had to be traced back to Irish. (It is a sobering reflection of the deterioration of spoken Gaelic in the last hundred years that the Bard's remarkable vocabulary came not from books but from the oral tradition within his own family)".

Closer to home, his maternal uncle, the poet Dòmhnaill Ruadh Phàislig, was another major influence. Although Dòmhnall Iain was never to follow in his uncle's footsteps by translating the verse of Scottish national poet Robert Burns into Gaelic, he did praise the Lowland poet in verse, used the Burns stanza more than once in his later poetry, and often emulated Burns by, "extracting a deeper moral from a simple rural incident".

His first exposure to the English language was through the coercive Anglicisation enforced through corporal punishment at the Howmore school, which Dòmhnall despised attending and routinely played truant. Despite the four-year age difference, Dòmhnall Iain was very close to his younger sister Ann MacDonald (1923–1993), with whom he shared, "a similar irrepressible spirit of fun which often led them into mischief". Even though they both knew that it would later involve a generous helping of corporal punishment at the hands of the schoolmaster, Dòmhnall and Ann routinely played truant together. She often recalled in later years how their favourite ploy was to "borrow" the estate factor's boat for an unauthorised sail on Loch Druidibeg.

At the age of fourteen, Dòmhnall happily dropped out of school and joined in the arduous work on his family's croft. Similarly to many other young Gaels of his generation, Dòmhnall Iain Dhonnchaidh and a few close friends enlisted at age eighteen in the Inverness-shire battalion of the Territorial Army, which allowed them to see something of the Scottish mainland in annual training camps. Two years later, upon hearing of the outbreak of World War II in September 1939, Dòmhnall gleefully exclaimed to his sister Ann, "At last!" In later years, however, his poetry would be filled with bitter longing for both his lost innocence and the peacetime culture of South Uist that he had once longed to escape.

== War poet ==
Following combat training at Inverness and Aldershot, he was assigned to the 4th Service Battalion, King's Own Cameron Highlanders, 152nd Infantry Brigade.

According to his friend Bill Innes, however, "According to his contemporaries, [Dòmhnaill Iain's] rebellious nature earned him more than his fair share of bullying during his training in Aldershot. This may have been the trigger for the bitterness towards the English which surfaces occasionally in his poetry".

He was then sent to the Third French Republic in January 1940. Along with his whole division and the fellow Gaelic war poet Aonghas Caimbeul, he was assigned to active service as part of the French IX Corps, saw combat against the invading Wehrmacht during the Fall of France, when he was ultimately among those surrounded by German panzers, and left behind after the rest of the British Expeditionary Force was evacuated from Dunkirk.

After Major-General Victor Fortune surrendered the whole 51st (Highland) Division to Major-General Erwin Rommel at Saint-Valery-en-Caux on 12 June 1940, Dòmhnaill Iain spent the rest of the war as a POW in Nazi Germany.

While en route to captivity in Germany in June 1940, Dòmhnall composed a lament for his fellow soldiers who had lost their lives before the 51st (Highland) Division surrendered. The result is the Gaelic song poem "Na Gillean nach Maireann" ("The Lads that Are No More"), which he set to the air "O ho nighean, è ho nighean" and which bears a strong resemblance to the poem "Tha Mi Duilich, Cianail, Duilich" ("I am Sad, Lamenting, and Full of Sorrow"), which was composed for very similar reasons during World War I by his cousin Dòmhnall Ruadh Chorùna.

In accordance with the Third Geneva Convention, POWs like MacDonald, who were below the rank of sergeant, were required to work. MacDonald spent his captivity attached to Arbeitskommando ("labour units") and doing unpaid labour, mainly in quarries and salt mines. MacDonald later described, "in harrowing detail", his experiences in enemy captivity in the postwar memoir Fo Sgàil a' Swastika ("Under the Shadow of the Swastika").

Bill Innes later wrote, "Interestingly, he had no hatred of the German people. Although some of their leaders descended to the depths of Satan's angels, he often said he found the ordinary people much like the Gaels in their interests in culture and music. He felt he had more in common with them than with the French - or the English!"

Dòmhnall Iain Dhonnchaidh composed many works of oral poetry during forced labour in German captivity, all of which he memorized and was only able to write down and edit for publication following the end of the war and his release.

Dòmhnall Iain Dhonnchaidh's World War II experiences in both combat and as a POW in German captivity left him as a fervent Scottish nationalist with an intensive hatred of colonialism, militarism, and war; which later expressed itself in many works of Gaelic poetry condemning what he considered the wasteful loss of human life due to World War I, World War II, the Cold War, the Troubles in Northern Ireland, and the 1967 Abortion Act.

With these changed beliefs in mind, Dòmhnall would often say following his return from captivity, "I learned more in those five years than I could have in eighty years of ordinary living".

== Post-War life ==
Dòmhnall was demobilised and returned, for the rest of his life, to working on his father's crofts upon South Uist in 1946. His return home after the war was an event he celebrated in multiple song-poems.

For example, in "Moch sa Mhadainn 's Mi Dùsgadh" ("Rising Early"), Dòmhnall Iain Dhonnchaidh somewhat facetiously rewrote Scottish national poet Alasdair mac Mhaighstir Alasdair's "Òran Eile donn Phrionnsa" ("A New Song to the Prince"), which celebrates the arrival in Scotland of Prince Charles Edward Stuart, the raising of his standard at Glenfinnan, and the beginning of the Jacobite rising of 1745. In Dòmhnall Iain Dhonnchaidh's version, which is sung to the exact same melody, he instead speaks of his joy at waking up on board a ship that was about to return him to South Uist after five years in enemy captivity.

In 1948, MacDonald's poem "Moladh Uibhist" ("In Praise of Uist"), which he had composed while being held as a POW and carefully edited for publication following his release, won the Bardic Crown at the Royal National Mòd at Glasgow. In the poem, which is in strict bardic metre, Dòmhnall lamented what he had come to see in enemy captivity as his own stupidity in not properly appreciating the peacetime and civilian life that had once bored him so terribly. He called the reckoning of his wartime experiences bitter and praised the natural beauty, wildlife, history, and culture of his native island at considerable length.

The 1950 removal of the Stone of Scone from Westminster Abbey by Scottish nationalists delighted Dòmhnall Iain, who celebrated the event with the poem "Nuair a Ghoideadh a' Chlach, neo Aoir nan Sasannach" ("When the Stone was Stolen, or Lampoon on the English"). Bill Innes has written that the resulting poem, "reveals just how much the Bard resented the English domination of his country".

Dòmhnall Iain expressed very similar opinions in other poems, such as "An Clàrsair" ("The Harper"), in which, "he calls on the Gaels to rise again as their ancestors once did", and "A' Chrois Tàra" ("The Fiery Cross"), in which he cited the traditional means that Scottish clan chiefs would summon the whole clan to grab their weapons and come immediately to a gathering, and similarly called, "on Gaels to unite ... in defense of their language, their culture, and their freedom".

Dòmhnall began collecting Hebridean mythology and folklore from the local oral tradition for Calum Maclean and the newly founded School of Scottish Studies. During the last year before his father's death in 1954, Dòmhnall Iain Dhonnchaidh, in response to Maclean's request to tape and transcribe everything his father knew, managed to record and transcribe more than 1,500 pages of his father's stories. In response, Maclean wrote in 1954, (Scottish Gaelic: "Gun aon teagamh, 's e Dòmhnall Iain... am fear is fheàrr air cruinneachadh beul-aithris a thàinig 'nar measg an Albainn san linn so.") "Without any doubt, Donald John... is the best folklore collector that has come amongst us in Scotland in this century".

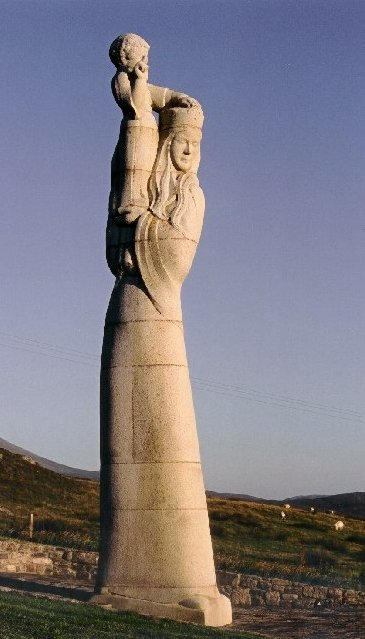
Our Lady of the Isles, on South Uist

The 1958 dedication of the statue of Our Lady of the Isles and the instrumental role played in the project by Canon John Morrison, (aka "Father Rocket") were both commemorated by MacDonald in the poem "Laoidh Statue Ruaidheabhal" ("The Statue at Rueval").

After folklorist Calum Maclean died prematurely of cancer in 1960, Dòmhnall Iain Dhonnchaidh composed a famous Gaelic eulogy and said of his friend's death, (Scottish Gaelic: "Nuair thàinig naidheachd na crìche, Gun tug I gearradh nam chridh' mar gu sàbht' e"), "When news came of the end, It was as a saw-cut to my heart".

As a staunch and believing member of the Catholic Church in Scotland, Dòmhnall Iain Dhonnchaidh, "was deeply disturbed by the increase in the rate of abortion as a result of the 1967 Act". The result was his famous Pro-Life poem in strict bardic metre, "An Guth à Broinn na Màthair" ("Voice from the Womb"). According to his friend Bill Innes, (Scottish Gaelic: "Bha gu leòr a bhruidhneadh às leth còraichean na màthair - ach cha robh comas bruidhne aig maoth-phaist'. Dh'fhaodach bàrd bruidheann air a shon ge-ta",) "There were eloquent advocates aplenty for the rights of women. The unborn child had no voice - but a poet could provide one". The resulting song-poem was first published, according to literary scholar Ronald Black, in the Stornoway Gazette on 29 December 1973. It remained popular enough to widely circulate in manuscript for decades afterwards, until it was finally republished posthumously in Dòmhnall Iain's first collected poetry volume in 1998.

The 1969 outbreak of The Troubles in Northern Ireland horrified the deeply religious Dòmhnall Iain Dhonnchaidh, particularly in what he saw as the hypocritical misuse of religion by both Irish Republican and Ulster Loyalist paramilitaries to justify terrorism. The result was his poem "Uilebheist Ulaidh" ("The Monster of Ulster"), in which he accused "the Monster" of worshipping at the altar of revenge topped by candles of jealousy and greed, and offering up the blood of innocent children and the bitter grief of their mothers.

Dòmhnall Iain was deeply moved by reading Seán Ó Tuama and Thomas Kinsella's "An Duanaire An Irish Anthology: 1600-1900. Poems of the Dispossessed". In the resulting "Trí Rainn agus Amhrán: Air dha an leabhar Eireannach Poetry of the Dispossessed a leughadh" ("Three Verses and a Poem: Having read the Irish book 'Poetry of the Dispossessed'"), Dòmhnall Iain compared the sufferings of the Irish people during the era described in Kinsella's poetry book with those of the Scottish Gaels after the Battle of Culloden (Scottish Gaelic: "Dhrium Ath-saidh na pèin"), in 1746, (Scottish Gaelic: "Chaith sibh tìm san Duibhne, cùmte fo mhùiseag nur dùthaich fhèin"), "You spent time in darkness, confined, oppressed in your own country". Dòmhnall Iain praised, however, the Irish people for their loyalty despite systematic religious persecution to the Catholic Church in Ireland and their ultimate victory in the Irish War of Independence.

During a tribute to Queen Elizabeth II in a poem composed for her 1977 25th Jubilee, Dòmhnaill Iain Dhonnchaidh praised the Queen's maternal descent from the Scottish Earls of Strathmore and Chiefs of Clan Lyon. Dòmhnall Iain Donnchaidh also added facetiously that the Queen's understanding of affairs in mainland Europe owed itself to her descent from "the Georges" (Scottish Gaelic: na Seòrais) instead of the House of Stuart. Dòmhnall Iain proceeded to express extremely harsh criticism of the British Empire in his other poems. When he discussed the enormous loss of soldiers' lives during World War I and the annual ceremonies at Menin Gate in "Flanders", "An Carriage-Cuimhne Cogaidh" ("The War Memorial"), and "Cogadh no Sìth" ("War or Peace"), Dòmhnall Iain Dhonnchaidh gave full vent to a belief grounded in his experiences during World War II that, "Human life was far too precious to be squandered at the whim of governments. In particular, he felt that generations of Islanders had paid far too high a price through the years for wars resulting from decisions made in London."

Similarly during the late 1970s, Dòmhnall's enthusiasm for following in the footsteps of Allan MacDonald by composing hymn texts and Christian poetry in Scottish Gaelic was fired up by Ishabel T. MacDonald, who introduced him to the work of Seán Ó Riada in setting religious poetry in the Irish language to Seán Nos-style tunes. After Dòmhnall composed the poems, Ishabel MacDonald and Roderick MacNeill set them to traditional Scottish Gaelic-style melodies, which were published posthumously in the 1986 Catholic hymnbook "Seinnibh dhan Tighearna" and which remain deeply popular.

In 1981, Dòmhnall Iain agreed, as part of a bridge-building exercise organized by Gaelic language radio, to compose both literary translations and original lyrics set to arias from Mozart and Verdi operas. Scottish traditional musician Mary Sandeman ultimately made "Nìghneagan Òga", his translation of Voi Che Sapete from Mozart's The Marriage of Figaro, a regular part of her repertoire. Sandeman not only recorded the aria twice, but even sang the Gaelic words before an audience of more than 5,000 at the Royal Albert Hall.

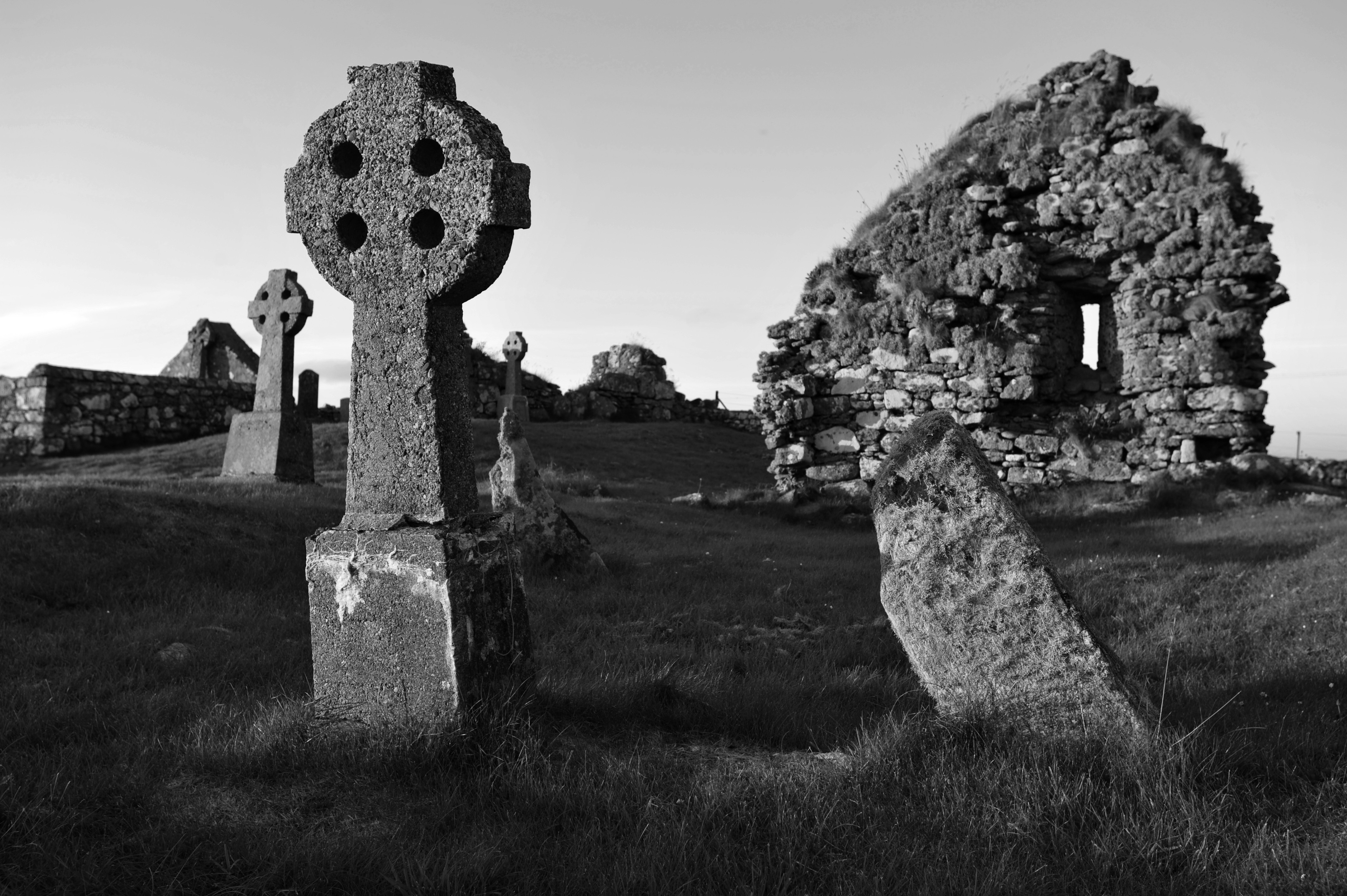
Howmore Monastery ruins, South Uist.

Dòmhnall also drew upon his Catholic Faith, his imagination, and local history while composing the poems "Smaointean - Aig Làrach Seann Eaglais Hogh Mòir" ("Thoughts - at Howmore Temple Ruins") and "Teampall Hogh Mòir" ("Howmore Temple"); in which he called for a return to the simpler Pre-Reformation religious life on South Uist, which was once centred around the ruined monastery, its school, and its church.

Dòmhnall Iain was understandably elated by the efforts of the underground Solidarity labour union and social movement to nonviolently resist both Marxist-Leninism and Martial law in Poland. He accordingly had very high praise for them in his poem "Poland".

Of "Ùrnaigh Naomh Francis", Dòmhnall Iain's Gaelic verse paraphrase of the Prayer of Saint Francis, his friend Bill Innes has written, (Scottish Gaelic: "'Se e Mgr. Cailean MacAonghais a dh'iarr air Dòmhnall Iain an ùrnaigh ainmeil seo eadar-theangachadh. Chan eil e na iongnadh gun do dhùisgeadh ùidh a' bhàird - a chionn tha i mar gheàrr-chunntais air fheallsanachd fhèin"), "The translation to verse of this well-known prayer was done at the request of Fr. Colin MacInnes. It is no surprise that the project appealed to the Bard for it could almost be read as a summary of his own philosophy".

== Personal life ==
Dòmhnall Iain Dhonnchaidh began his courtship of North Uist poet Mary M Maclean (Scottish Gaelic: Màiri M NicGhillEathain) by letter following his return from captivity in 1946. After Mary Maclean also won the Bardic Crown at the 1951 Royal National Mòd in Edinburgh, they became formally engaged. Although Dòmhnall Iain was not at all bothered by the possibility of a disparity of cult marriage, the Calvinist population of North Uist made things very difficult for Mary and intensely pressured her to cease, "associating with a Catholic". Maclean was also more concerned about the religious differences and did not wish for her fiancé, even if he proved willing, to feel forced to change his faith. Equally motivated by fear of losing her independence, Mary Maclean eventually broke off their engagement, switched from the Church of Scotland to the Free Church, and never married.

Even so, Dòmhnall's thwarted love for Mary Maclean inspired several immortal works of Gaelic love poetry, including "An Rìbhinn Uasal" ("The Noble Maid") sung to the tune "Seinn an duan seo", "Do Mhàiri NicIllEathain" ("To Mary Maclean") sung to the tune "A Pheigi a ghràidh", "Mo Chridhe fo Leòn" ("My Heart is Sore"), and "Thusa" ("You"). Màiri MacLean also composed what has been described as some the most poignant poetry in recent Scottish Gaelic literature in response to the end of their relationship.

After Màiri broke off their engagement, Dòmhnall eventually married his neighbour Neilina MacNeil (Scottish Gaelic: Nellie Alastair Thàilleir) in 1954. Their only child, a daughter named Margaret (née MacDonald) Campbell, was born in 1955. His marriage to Nellie inspired the love song "Chan longnadh Ged Bhithinn" ("No Wonder That I Should"), which is sung to the tune "Bu chaomh leam bhith mireadh".

== Death and legacy ==
As he grew older, Dòmhnall Iain's pondering of his own mortality and the inevitability of death for all human beings inspired his iconic memento mori poem "Geata Tìr nan Òg" ("The Gate to Tìr nan Òg").

While accompanying his wife Nellie during a medical appointment at the Western Infirmary in Glasgow, MacDonald's condition was serious enough for him to be admitted for observation himself. He died there unexpectedly on 2 October 1986, was returned to South Uist for burial, and now lies in Ardmichael Cemetery.

Similarly to his contemporary Duncan Livingstone, a Gaelic poet from the Isle of Mull resident in South Africa under Apartheid, Dòmhnaill Iain Dhonnchaidh made an English-Gaelic literary translation of Thomas Gray's Elegy in a Country Churchyard, which has been termed "masterly" and which he completed in the late 1940s.

According to Ronald Black, a recognized scholar of modern Scottish Gaelic literature, "The work of Donald John MacDonald represents a powerful combination of deep traditional knowledge with modern Gaelic literacy. A cairn in his memory and that of his uncle Donald Macintyre was erected at Snishival", and formally unveiled by both poets' daughters on 1 October 1996.

== In popular culture ==
- The School of Scottish Studies at George Square, Edinburgh has more than twenty volumes of transcribed Hebridean mythology and folklore materials collected from the oral tradition by him.
- Scottish traditional musician Julie Fowlis has both performed and recorded Dòmhnall Iain Dhonnchaidh's poem "An Ròn" ("The Seal"), which speaks with the voice of a Selkie from Celtic mythology, for her 2014 album Gach sgeul - Every story.

== Writings ==
- Fo Sgàil a' Swastika / Under the Shadow of the Swastika, Inverness, 1974.
- Uibhist a Deas, (the history and folklore of South Uist), 1981.
- Chì Mi / I See: Bàrdachd Dhòmhnaill Iain Dhonnchaidh / The Poetry of Donald John MacDonald, edited by Bill Innes. Acair, Stornoway, 1998, 2001, 2021.
