= Free Presbyterian Church, Perth =

Free Presbyterian Church
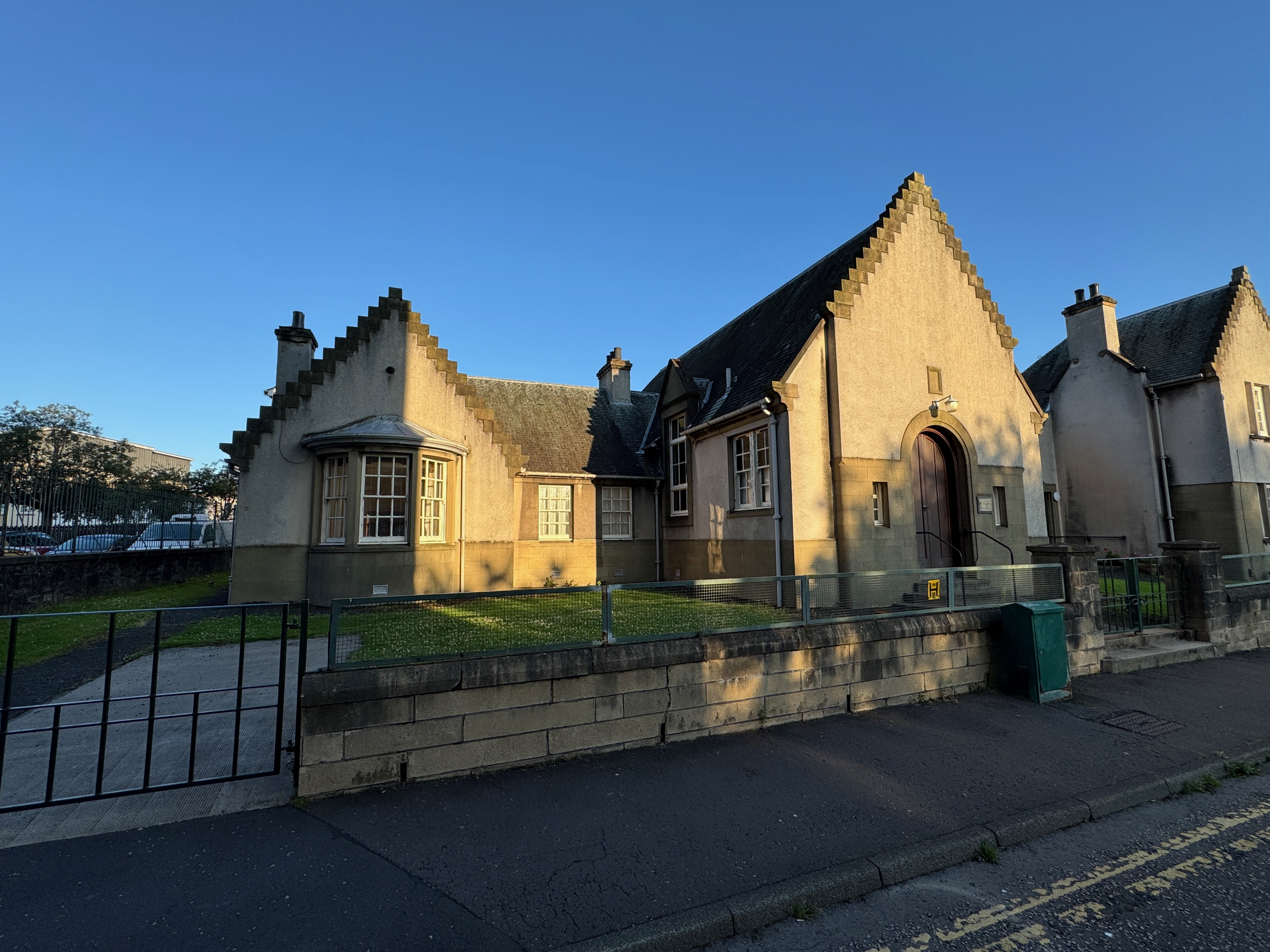
- The church in 2024
- Free Presbyterian Church
- 56°23′38″N 3°26′11″W
- Location: Pomarium Street, Perth, Perth and Kinross
- Country: Scotland
- Denomination: Free Presbyterian

History
- Status: open

Architecture
- Functional status: used
- Heritage designation: Category C listed building
- Designated: 22 September 2009
- Architect: William Erskine Thomson
- Completed: 1939 (87 years ago)

Perth Free Presbyterian Church is located in Perth, Perth and Kinross, Scotland. Standing on Pomarium Street, in the southwestern corner of the city centre, it was completed in 1939. It is now a Category C listed building. The church was designed by local architect William Erskine Thomson.

A "distinctive, little-altered, well-detailed church," it is notable for its crowstepped gables and steep pedimented dormerheads.

The church and adjoining flat were originally built as a hall and caretaker's flat for the Forteviot Charitable Trust in what was then a run-down area of Perth.

== See also ==
- List of listed buildings in Perth, Scotland
