= Lachlan Maclean, 3rd Laird of Torloisk =

Scottish nobleman (17th-century)

Lachlan Maclean, 3rd Laird of Torloisk was a 17th-century Scottish nobleman. He managed the estate of Sir John Maclean, 4th Baronet with Lauchlan Maclean, 2nd Laird of Brolas during his minority.

He was reputed one of the most gallant and accomplished gentlemen of his time, and well qualified for the highest station in the gift of his country. He did not aspire to state intrigue, but contented himself in looking after affairs of interest to his clan. He managed, in conjunction with Lauchlan Maclean, 2nd Laird of Brolas, the estate of MacLean during the minority of Sir John Maclean, 4th Baronet, and was of great service in retrieving the embarrassed affairs of the chief.

He married Barbara, daughter of Alexander MacDonald of Sleat, brother of Sir James Mor Macdonald, 9th Laird of Sleat, and had issue, two sons and one daughter:

- Hector Maclean of Torloisk, who died at the age of eighteen
- Alexander Maclean, 4th Laird of Torloisk (1690-1715), was captain in the Second battalion of the Scots Guards, and served in the Spanish wars; at age twenty-five, he had his leg broken at the Battle of Brihuega, in Spain, in 1710, by a musket ball, of which he fevered and died; dying without children, he was succeeded by his cousin
- Jannet Maclean of Torloisk, married to Archibald Campbell of Inverawe.

It was in 1685 that Lachlan besieged, captured, and destroyed the castle of Carnassary, and, as is shown by the petition of Duncan Campbell. He died prior to 1690.

== Ancestors ==
Lachlan Maclean, 3rd Laird of Torloisk's ancestors in three generations
Lachlan Maclean, 3rd Laird of Torloisk	Father: Hector Maclean, 2nd Laird of Torloisk	Paternal Grandfather: Lachlan Og Maclean, 1st Laird of Torloisk	Paternal Great-Grandfather: Sir Lachlan Mor Maclean
Lachlan Maclean, 3rd Laird of Torloisk	Father: Hector Maclean, 2nd Laird of Torloisk	Paternal Grandfather: Lachlan Og Maclean, 1st Laird of Torloisk	Paternal Great-grandmother:
Lachlan Maclean, 3rd Laird of Torloisk	Father: Hector Maclean, 2nd Laird of Torloisk	Paternal Grandmother: Marian Campbell of Achnabreck	Paternal Great-Grandfather: Sir Duncan Campbell of Achnabreck
Lachlan Maclean, 3rd Laird of Torloisk	Father: Hector Maclean, 2nd Laird of Torloisk	Paternal Grandmother: Marian Campbell of Achnabreck	Paternal Great-Grandmother:
Lachlan Maclean, 3rd Laird of Torloisk	Mother:	Maternal Grandfather:	Maternal Great-Grandfather:
Lachlan Maclean, 3rd Laird of Torloisk	Mother:	Maternal Grandfather:	Maternal Great-Grandmother:
Lachlan Maclean, 3rd Laird of Torloisk	Mother:	Maternal Grandmother:	Maternal Great-grandfather:
Lachlan Maclean, 3rd Laird of Torloisk	Mother:	Maternal Grandmother:	Maternal Great-Grandmother:
