= Sir Charles Maclean, 9th Baronet =

Soldier; 25th Chief of Clan Maclean (1798–1883)

Sir Charles Fitzroy Maclean

25th Clan Chief 9th Baronet of Morvern 5th Lord Maclean
- In office 1847–1883
- Preceded by: Sir Fitzroy Jeffreys Grafton Maclean, 8th Baronet, father
- Succeeded by: Sir Fitzroy Donald Maclean, 10th Baronet, son

Personal details
- Born: Fitzroy Donald Maclean; 14 October 1798
- Died: 27 January 1883 (aged 84) Folkestone, Kent, England
- Spouse: Emily Eleanor Marsham
- Children: Sir Fitzroy Donald Maclean, 10th Baronet
- Parent: Sir Fitzroy Jeffreys Grafton Maclean, 8th Baronet

Sir Charles Fitzroy Maclean, 9th Baronet of Morvern (14 October 1798 – 27 January 1883) was the 25th Clan Chief of Clan Maclean from 1847 to 1883. He was a colonel of the 81st regiment from 1831 to 1839, then following that was also the Military Secretary at Gibraltar.

== Biography ==
He was born on 14 October 1798 to Sir Fitzroy Jeffreys Grafton Maclean, 8th Baronet. He was educated at Eton College and the Royal Military College, Sandhurst. In 1816, he entered the Scots Guards, and afterward commanded the 81st Regiment. He was military secretary at Gibraltar. In 1846, he retired from the army as a Colonel of the 13th Light Dragoons. He opposed the attempt to abolish kilts in the army.

On 10 May 1831, he married Emily Eleanor Marsham, fourth daughter of the Honorable and Reverend Jacob Marsham. They had as their children:

- Sir Fitzroy Donald Maclean, 10th Baronet, his heir and successor
- Emily Frances Harriet Maclean
- Louisa Marianne Maclean who married 12 July 1860, to Honorable Ralph Pelham Nevill, second son of the William Nevill, 4th Earl of Abergavenny
- Fanny Henrietta Maclean, married 2 October 1855, to Admiral Sir Arthur Hood, 1st Baron Hood of Avalon
- Georgiana Marcia Maclean, married 20 October 1868, to John Rolls, 1st Baron Llangattock of The Hendre

He died on 27 January 1883 or 27 December 1883 at West Cliffe House in Folkestone in Kent, England.

Baronetage of Nova Scotia
Preceded by Fitzroy Maclean	Baronet (of Duart and Marvern); 1847–1883	Succeeded by Fitzroy Maclean
