= Ewen Maclean, 9th Laird of Ardgour =

Ewen Maclean, 9th Laird of Ardgour was the son of John 'Crubach' Maclean, 8th Laird of Ardgour and his first wife, Anne, daughter of Angus Campbell, Captain of Dunstaffnage.

== Biography ==
He married Mary, daughter of Lachlan MacLean of Lochbuie, and had by her:

- Allan Maclean, 10th Laird of Ardgour, born in 1668
- Donald Maclean, who married Janet, daughter of Lachlan MacLean of Calgary
- Charles Maclean
- John Maclean
- Lachlan Maclean who was a lieutenant in the Spanish service, and was killed in a duel at Madrid.

Ewen was succeeded in the estates by his son, Allan.
