= Allan McLean (footballer) =

Australian rules footballer

Personal information
- Full name: Allan McLean
- Born: 28 January 1898; Maffra, Victoria
- Died: 6 December 1968 (aged 69); Maffra, Victoria
- Original team: Xavier College
- Height: 187 cm (6 ft 2 in)
- Weight: 72 kg (159 lb)

Playing career^{1}
Years	Club	Games (Goals)
1919	Melbourne	13 (2)
- ^{1} Playing statistics correct to the end of 1919.

Allan McLean (28 January 1899 – 6 December 1968) was an Australian rules footballer who played for the Melbourne Football Club in the Victorian Football League (VFL).
