= Bruce Atta Campbell =

British Army officer (1888–1954)

Sir Bruce Atta Campbell KCB CBE TD
- Born: 1888
- Died: 1954 (aged 65–66)
- Education: Eton College; Trinity Hall, Cambridge
- Military career
- Allegiance: United Kingdom
- Branch: Territorial Army (British Army)
- Service years: 1908–1940s
- Rank: Brigadier
- Units: Scottish Horse; Argyll and Sutherland Highlanders
- Commands: 8th Battalion of the Argyll and Sutherland Highlanders
- Battle of Gallipoli: First World War
- Other work: Lord Lieutenant of Argyllshire

Brigadier Sir Bruce Atta Campbell 2nd of Arduaine, KCB CBE TD (1888 – 1954) was a British Army officer and appointed by King George VI as Lord Lieutenant of Argyllshire in 1949, after the death of the previous postholder Niall Campbell, 10th Duke of Argyll.

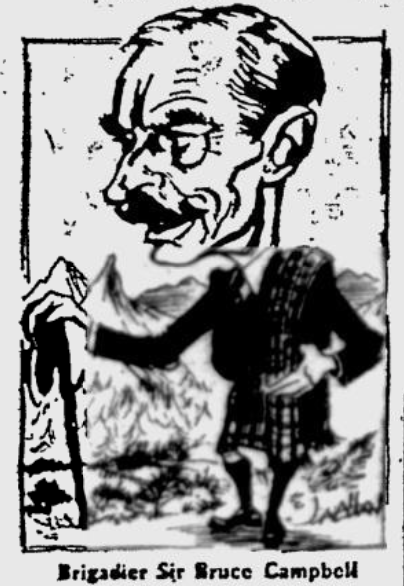
Newspaper cartoon drawing of Brigadier Sir Bruce Campbell, published in The Bulletin newspaper on Dec 3rd 1951

== Military career and honours ==
Educated at Eton and Trinity Hall, Cambridge, Sir Bruce's early plans for military office via Sandhurst were thwarted by a heart condition but he was able to join the Territorials (Scottish Horse) with the rank of Second Lieutenant in 1908. After the outbreak of the First World War he was appointed adjutant on 3 November 1914, and was wounded in Gallipoli in 1916. He became a brigade major on 7 May 1918, temporary Major in 1921, and was conferred with the Territorial Decoration in 1925. By 1933 he held the rank of Lieutenant-Colonel and Brevet Colonel and was given command of the 8th Battalion of the Argyll and Sutherland Highlanders. He became chair of the Argyll Territorial Association on 24 August 1939 and was appointed to the honorary rank of Colonel on 21 July 1940. He served as a staff officer with the Army Cadet Force in Scottish Command from 4 October 1943.

He was appointed Companion of the Order of the Bath (CB) in the King's 1938 New Year Honours and Knight Commander, Order of the Bath (KCB) in the King's 1948 Birthday Honours, by which time he held the rank of Brigadier. After the Second World War he was president of the Argyll Territorial and Auxiliary Forces Association.

== Personal life ==
He was the son of tea-planter J(ames) Arthur Campbell 1st of Arduaine and his wife Ethel Margaret Bruce. Arthur had bought a farm estate previously known as Asknish, renamed it Arduaine and started building a “mansion house” there in 1898, along with a botanical garden in its grounds.

In 1913 Sir Bruce married Margaret Helen Macrae-Gilstrap (daughter of Lieutenant Colonel John Macrae-Gilstrap, who had bought the then ruined Eilean Donan castle in 1911), and lived with her at Arduaine House after the death of his mother in 1936. Sir Bruce's son Iain sold the house in 1964, when it became the Loch Melfort Motor Inn (now Loch Melfort Hotel); the botanical garden was also sold separately and is now the NTS-managed Arduaine Garden.
