= Donald Maclean, 5th Laird of Torloisk =

Donald Maclean, 5th Laird of Torloisk was the 5th Laird of Torloisk.

== Biography ==
He was a son of John of Tarbert. John of Tarbert was the third son of Hector Maclean, 2nd Laird of Torloisk.

Donald was noted for the urbanity of his manners and the kindness of his disposition. At the Battle of Sheriffmuir, he was Major of the regiment of Sir John Maclean, 4th Baronet, and was commended for his prudent and gallant conduct on that occasion.

He married Mary, daughter of Archibald Campbell of Sunderland, and had ten children, four sons and six daughters:

- Hector Maclean, 6th Laird of Torloisk studied law in Edinburgh, Lachlan Maclean of Torloisk, General Allan Maclean of Torloisk, Archibald Maclean of Laggan, Mary, Anna, Alicia, Christiana, Betty, and Elizabeth. Allan, the third son, became a general; Archibald resided at Laggan and never married. Mary and Betty died unmarried; Anna married Donald MacLean, a cadet of the house of Torloisk. Alicia married Lachlan MacQuarrie of Ulva; Christiana married Rev. Alexander Maclean, minister of Kilninan, Mull; Elizabeth first married Lachlan Maclean of Garmony, of the family of Lochbuie, and secondly, to James Park of Jamaica.

Donald died August 20, 1748, and was succeeded by his eldest son, Hector Maclean, 6th Laird of Torloisk.

== Ancestors ==
Donald Maclean, 5th Laird of Torloisk's ancestors in three generations
Donald Maclean, 5th Laird of Torloisk	Father: John of Tarbert	Paternal Grandfather: Hector Maclean, 2nd Laird of Torloisk	Paternal Great-Grandfather: Lachlan Og MacLean, 1st Laird of Torloisk
Donald Maclean, 5th Laird of Torloisk	Father: John of Tarbert	Paternal Grandfather: Hector Maclean, 2nd Laird of Torloisk	Paternal Great-grandmother: Marian, daughter of Sir Duncan Campbell of Achnabreck
Donald Maclean, 5th Laird of Torloisk	Father: John of Tarbert	Paternal Grandmother: Catherine Campbell of Lochnell	Paternal Great-Grandfather: John Campbell of Lochnell
Donald Maclean, 5th Laird of Torloisk	Father: John of Tarbert	Paternal Grandmother: Catherine Campbell of Lochnell	Paternal Great-Grandmother:
Donald Maclean, 5th Laird of Torloisk	Mother:	Maternal Grandfather:	Maternal Great-Grandfather:
Donald Maclean, 5th Laird of Torloisk	Mother:	Maternal Grandfather:	Maternal Great-Grandmother:
Donald Maclean, 5th Laird of Torloisk	Mother:	Maternal Grandmother:	Maternal Great-grandfather:
Donald Maclean, 5th Laird of Torloisk	Mother:	Maternal Grandmother:	Maternal Great-Grandmother:
