= Lord Lieutenant of Argyllshire =

Ceremonial officer in Argyllshire, Scotland

This is a list of people who served as Lord Lieutenant of Argyllshire. The office was created on 6 May 1794 and replaced by the Lord Lieutenant of Argyll and Bute in 1975.

- John Campbell, 5th Duke of Argyll 17 March 1794 – 1799
- George Campbell, 6th Duke of Argyll 16 April 1799 – 22 October 1839
- John Campbell, 2nd Marquess of Breadalbane 4 December 1839 – 8 November 1862
- George Campbell, 8th Duke of Argyll 15 November 1862 – 24 April 1900
- John Campbell, 9th Duke of Argyll 27 July 1900 – 2 May 1914
- Gavin Campbell, 1st Marquess of Breadalbane 17 August 1914 – 19 October 1922
- Niall Campbell, 10th Duke of Argyll 20 February 1923 – 20 August 1949
- Sir Bruce Atta Campbell 5 December 1949 – 28 August 1954
- Charles Maclean, Baron Maclean 24 November 1954 – 1975

== Deputy lieutenants ==
A deputy lieutenant of Argyllshire was commissioned by the Lord Lieutenant of Argyllshire. Deputy lieutenants support the work of the lord-lieutenant. There can be several deputy lieutenants at any time, depending on the population of the county. Their appointment does not terminate with the changing of the lord-lieutenant, but they usually retire at age 75.

=== 19th Century ===
- 24 January 1848: Charles Douglas-Compton, 3rd Marquess of Northampton
- 24 January 1848: Augustus Henry Moreton Macdonald
- 24 January 1848: Neill Malcolm
- 24 January 1848: Strachan Irvine Popham
- 24 January 1848: Lieutenant Colonel Alexander Campbell of Auchendarroch
- 24 January 1848: Archibald James Lamont
- 24 January 1848: Alexander Campbell of Monzie
- 24 January 1848: Murdoch MacLaine of Lochbuie
- 24 January 1848: Duncan McNeill, 1st Baron Colonsay

== Notes and references ==
- Sainty, J. C. "Lieutenants and Lord-Lieutenants of Counties (Scotland) 1794-".
