= Lauchlan Maclean, 2nd Laird of Brolas =

- Born: 1650
- Died: 1687 (age 37)
- Predecessor: Donald Maclean, 1st Laird of Brolas
- Successor: Donald Maclean, 3rd Laird of Brolas
- Spouse: Isabella Maclean of Torloisk
- Children: Donald Maclean, 3rd Laird of Brolas
- Parent: Donald Maclean, 1st Laird of Brolas

Lauchlan Maclean, 2nd Laird of Brolas (1650–1687) was the second Laird of Brolas.

== Biography ==
He was born in 1650 to Donald Maclean, 1st Laird of Brolas. He was a good and prudent man, of a solid judgment and excellent temper. He was slow in action, and on account of this weakness contrived to associate with him Lachlan Og MacLean, 1st Laird of Torloisk, a man full of spirit and activity. He was appointed tutor to Sir John Maclean, 4th Baronet, and associated Torloisk with him in the management of the estates, and kept Archibald Campbell, 1st Duke of Argyll from getting any solid footing in the estates of MacLean, till Argyle was glad to take Tiree in compensation for his whole claim. He was member in parliament for the shire when James II of England was commissioner for Scotland, and though he was much caressed by James, who desired to reconcile Brolas to his celebrated measures for abrogating the penal statutes, but refusing to vote against what he believed to be his duty, he absented himself from parliament when those measures were being discussed. He was married to Isabella, daughter of Hector Maclean, 2nd Laird of Torloisk. He died in the year 1687, in the thirty-seventh year of his age, and was succeeded by his son, Donald Maclean, 3rd Laird of Brolas.
