= John Garbh Maclean, 7th Laird of Coll =

Scottish official

John Garbh Maclean, 7th Laird of Coll was a Scottish official who lived in the 17th century.

== Biography ==
He succeeded to the estates of his father, was a man of great wisdom and piety, a lover of men, and given to hospitality. He was a composer of music and a performer on the harp and fife. Two of his compositions, Caoineadh Rioghail, the Royal Lament, and Toum Murron, are referred to in earlier works. The former, supposedly a lament for the execution of King Charles I of England in 1649, is preserved in Angus Fraser's manuscripts. Of the latter tune, Toum Murron, no trace seems to now exist.

The following anecdote has been handed down concerning him:

A captain, Wirttus, master of an English vessel, was wrecked on the island, and started for Coll's castle, where, seeing the laird sitting with a bible in one hand, and a harp placed by his side, was so struck by the venerable appearance of the old gentleman and his occupation, that he exclaimed with admiration, "Is this king David again restored to earth?"

He was very temperate, as appears from his refusing to visit a friend of his in the isle of Skye, who promised to give up the evidence of a debt he had against the family if he would come but one night to his house and make merry with him. Coll's friends urged him to go, but he replied that he would not become intoxicated once for any consideration, which, if he went, he could not evade without disobliging his friend. This temperance and his piety were exhibited during the whole course of his life.

He was first married to Florence, daughter of Sir Dugald Campbell of Auchnabreck, by whom he had:

- Hector Roy Maclean, The eldest son, Hector Roy, married Marian, daughter of Hector Maclean, 2nd Laird of Torloisk. He died before his father, leaving issue two sons, Lachlan Maclean, 8th Laird of Coll and Donald, and four daughters. Margaret, married first to Allan Stewart of Appin, and afterward to Donald MacLean of Kingerloch; Catherine, married to Hector MacLean of isle of Muck; Jannet, married to Hector, fifth son of Charles MacLean of Ardnacross; and Una, married to John MacLean of Achanasaul.
- Others were John of Totaranald, Hugh, killed at Inverkeithing, Florence, married to Donald Maclean, 1st Laird of Brolas, Jannet, married to Alexander MacDonald of Achdir, and Una, first married to John MacLean of Kinlochaline, and again to Duncan Stewart of Ardshie.

He was a second time married to Florence, daughter of the second Hector Og Maclean, by whom he had one daughter:

- Catherine, married to Lachlan MacQuarrie of Ulva.
