= Ken MacKinnon =

British linguist (1933–2021)

- Born: 26 August 1933; Poplar, London
- Died: 21 May 2021 (aged 87)
- Known for: Scottish Gaelic sociolinguistics
- Scientific career
- Fields: Sociolinguistics, Celtic studies
- Workplaces: Hatfield Polytechnic, University of Hertfordshire, Open University, University of Aberdeen Bòrd na Gàidhlig

Ken MacKinnon (26 August 1933 – 21 May 2021) was a British linguist who is known as the father of Scottish Gaelic sociolinguistics.

== Early life and career ==
MacKinnon was born in the Poplar in the Metropolitan Borough of Poplar on 26 August 1933 to parents whose families came from the Scottish Isle of Arran and Northern Ireland. During the London Blitz he was sent to Cornwall as many other children of the time. By 1944, he and his family had settled in the town of Leigh-on-Sea in Essex. He took a double degree in sociology and economics at the London School of Economics, followed by National Service in Germany. Following his return from Germany, he taught in Essex secondary schools and technical colleges, and was the head of department at the Barking College of Technology and subsequently was senior lecturer and reader at the Hatfield Polytechnic amongst various other appointments. He was chairman of the Southend-on-Sea council's planning committee and mayor.

== Scottish Gaelic ==
Although not a native speaker of Gaelic, he taught himself Gaelic when he took an interest in the language. He subsequently took a master's degree and was made a senior research fellow of the Social Science Research Council and used the opportunity to embark on studying the sociolinguistic situation of the Isle of Harris between 1972 and 1974 and was heavily involved in the discipline since then.

He was also a member of MAGOG between 2002 and 2004, a body providing advice on Scottish Gaelic to Scottish ministers, and which produced the Meek Report(2002), and was made a member of Bòrd na Gàidhlig in 2004. He was also on the board of MG Alba between 2008 and 2011.

He had an honorary professorship at the University of Aberdeen, and was a reader emeritus at the University of Hertfordshire. He tutored for the Open University in social sciences, education and language studies.

== Publications ==
Prof MacKinnon published numerous papers and books from the 1970s onwards, most of them on Gaelic in Scotland and Nova Scotia, minority languages and demographics, including:

- (1974) The Lions Tongue
- (1991) Gaelic A Past & Future Prospect
- (1998) Gaelic in Family, Work and Community Domains Euromosaic Project 1994 1995 in Scottish Language 1998, No. 17
- (2000) Neighbours in Persistence – Prospects for Gaelic Maintenance in a Globalising English World in McCoy, G. and Scott, M. (eds) Aithne na nGael – Gaelic Identities
