= Allan Maclean of Torloisk =

British Army general

Brigadier-General Allan Maclean
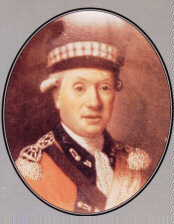
- Born: Allan Maclean; 1725; Torloisk near Kilninian, Argyll, Scotland
- Died: 18 February 1798 (aged 72–73); London
- Occupation: British Army officer
- Employer(s): Jacobites; Dutch Republic; British East India Company; Great Britain
- Known for: Jacobite Rising of 1745; War of the Austrian Succession; Seven Years' War; American Revolutionary War; Battle of Quebec (1775)
- Title: Brigadier-General
- Term: 1756–1783
- Political party: Jacobite
- Children: Son out of wedlock
- Parent(s): Donald Maclean, 5th Laird of Torloisk & Mary (Campbell) Maclean
- Relatives: Francis McLean

Allan Maclean of Torloisk (1725–1798) was a Jacobite who became a British Army general. He was born on the Isle of Mull, Scotland. He is best known for leading the 84th Regiment of Foot (Royal Highland Emigrants) in the Battle of Quebec.

== Early life ==
Allan was the third son of Donald Maclean, 5th Laird of Torloisk and Mary (Campbell) Maclean, daughter of Archibald Campbell of Sunderland. His other siblings were Hector, Lachlan, Archibald, Mary, Anna, Alicia, Christiana, Betty, and Elizabeth. His family, though titled, was quite poor, the Maclean of Torloisk's property valued at £671 6s. Maclaine begun his military training with the clan as a 17-year-old lieutenant in the Scots Brigade of the Royal Dutch Republic after a brief service as an adjutant.

== Jacobite rising and after ==
Participating in the Jacobite rising of 1746, and fighting at the Siege of Fort William and Battle of Culloden with the Maclachlans and Macleans battalion, he spent the next four years in exile, including in the service of France during War of the Austrian Succession, again in the Scots brigade in the rank of a lieutenant at Bergen Op Zoom in 1747, where he and Francis McLean were taken prisoner after they were part of the brigade that cut their way through the French lines. Lieutenants Allan and Francis Maclean were then presented before General von Lowenthal, who said to them,

Gentlemen, consider yourselves on parole. If all had conducted themselves as your brave corps have done, I should not now be master of Bergen-op-Zoom.

He returned to Edinburgh in 1750.

== Seven Years' War ==
On 8 January 1756 he was commissioned a lieutenant, and later travelled to the American colonies with the 62nd, later the 60th Royal America Regiment for two years. After being severely wounded at Ticonderoga on 8 July 1758 while with James Abercromby's troops taking part in the assault against Montcalm's forces in Fort Carillon. He served as a temporary captain under Wolfe at the taking of Quebec and on 16 January 1759 was given Captaincy of the Third New York Independent Company, being present at the siege of Niagara in July, where he was again dangerously wounded. While serving in that unit, from 1761 he also begun to participate in raising the 114th Foot (Maclean's Highlanders), helping to raise six companies when he returned to Scotland, and remaining with it as the Major Commandant until 1763. However the regiment never went on active service, and served only as a source of recruits for other Highland regiments serving in Germany and British America. A number of officers and soldiers from his regiment settled on St John's (Prince Edward) Island. While Maclean also later received a land grant on the island along with several other Maclean gentry, there is no record of him living there. In 1765 he moved to Paris where he fathered a son out of wedlock, and was recruited by the East India Company. Returning to England not in the rank of a Major, Allan begun to court Janet Maclean in Glasgow whom he had met earlier, and who came to London to be closer to him. At this time he also engaged in writing letters signed "Junius" which appeared in the Public Advertiser, advocating freedom of the press. On 4 February 1771 he wed Janet at the Monkwell Presbyterian Meeting House though she was half his age, which included a piper, at that time still forbidden in London. On 25 May of the following year he was appointed an active lieutenant-colonel in the army with full pay of one pound a day, but was not assigned a battalion, so had no duties to perform. Shortly before that his older brother Lauchlin was appointed Commissary-General of the army in Bengal, and was leaving England with his other brother Harry who had been hired as a secretary in the office of the East India Company in Calcutta. Allan had been close with both, but Lauchlin was still involved with the Jacobites, and this association could hurt his career. At this time a teenage son from Janet's father's second marriage came to live with them and, since they had not been able to conceive a child of their own, Allen revealed his son in France, and Janet agreed to foster the nine-year-old. Wanting to return to active service he eventually secured an audience with the Secretary at War, William Barrington, 2nd Viscount Barrington who refused his resignation to enable him to join the East India Company because the Crown needed officers with experience in the American colonies where trouble was expected over the Townshend Acts and the Stamp Act.

== Return to American colonies ==
Maclean's proposal to raise a Highland regiment for service in the colonies had to be sent to the King, who, as Captain-General, approves all new levies personally. The regiment was initially called the Royal Highland Emigrants and would be raised in the colonies from Highlanders settled there, commencing with New York. However, on arrival Maclean was warned that going into the city in his regimental uniform would invite attacks from the rebels, and that the British garrison had departed to Boston. He therefore sailed to that city to obtain commissions for his officers from General Gage. However, soon Gage retired due to age, and Maclean accompanied General Haldimand to New York who, although a British subject, was replaced by Sir William Howe, a brother of Viscount Howe and former colonel of 3rd Battalion, the 60th Regiment. He then proceeded to coordinate the clandestine recruiting activities of his officers, the 1st Battalion recruited in Canada and New York, and the 2nd Battalion in Nova Scotia and St John's Island, before proceeding to marshal them in Canada, himself travelling alone and in disguise of a doctor. During defence of Quebec he was appointed second-in-command by Governor Guy Carleton, often sleeping in his uniform at the Récollet cloister in Quebec City while the city was threatened by a rebel army under Benedict Arnold which had appeared on the Plains of Abraham in mid-November. Through the long siege, commanding as many as 1,178 troops, Maclean suffered a leg injury, causing a partial loss of its use for the remainder of his life. On 11 May 1776, now in the rank of Colonel, Maclean was appointed Adjutant-General of the army in Canada, which he held until 6 June 1777, when he was granted the rank of Brigadier-General, and ordered to take command of the Montreal Garrison. Due to increased danger for General Burgoyne's position, General Maclean was ordered, on 20 October, to march with the 31st Regiment and his own battalion of the Royal Highland Emigrants, to Chimney Point, Vermont, but during November was ordered to Quebec. He departed Quebec on 27 July 1776, for London in order to obtain rank and establishment for his regiment that had been promised, returning to Quebec on 28 May 1777. In 1778 he again went to England to make a personal appeal to the King on behalf of his regiment, which was successful. Sailing from Spithead on 1 May 1779, he arrived at Quebec on 16 August. Maclean finally became a regimental colonel in the active army 17 November 1780 with his regiment becoming the 84th Regiment of Foot, and with its station on the Canada–US border between Oswegatchie, New York and Fort Michilimackinac until 1782.

== After colonial service ==
Promoted to Brigadier-General for his services soon after the 1783 Treaty of Paris Maclean retired from the military service in 1784. An anomaly for his period, he was a career soldier without significant family wealth and connections, who rose high in rank on merit. A letter to Sir Henry Clinton at the end of the war reveals difficulties in recovering the expenses for the expansion of his regiment. He did not return to live in Scotland, but died in London, in March 1797. Contents of his correspondence with John Maclean of Lochbuie suggest that he died in comparative poverty.

== Commemoration ==
MacLean Memorial School is located in the town of Chibougamau in the Northern Quebec region about 230 km north from St-Félicien (Lac St-Jean).

In 2007 a cairn was unveiled at Kilninian Church in memory of Brigadier-General Allan Maclean of Torloisk, who 'saved Canada for the Empire' in 1775.
