= Sir Fitzroy Maclean, 8th Baronet =

General Sir Fitzroy Maclean Bt

24th Clan Chief 8th Baronet 4th Lord Maclean
- In office 1818–1847
- Preceded by: Sir Hector Maclean, 7th Baronet, half-brother
- Succeeded by: Sir Charles Fitzroy Maclean, 9th Baronet, son

Personal details
- Born: Fitzroy Jeffreys Grafton Maclean c. 1770
- Died: 5 July 1847 (aged 77)
- Spouse: Elizabeth Kidd
- Parent: Donald Maclean of Brolas
- Relatives: Sir Hector Maclean, 7th Baronet, brother; Donald Maclean, younger son

Sir Fitzroy Jeffreys Grafton Maclean, 8th Baronet (c. 1770 – 5 July 1847) was a British Army officer and 24th Clan Chief of Clan Maclean from 1818 to 1847. He succeeded his half brother, Sir Hector Maclean, 7th Baronet, when Hector died in 1818 without an heir.

== Biography ==
He was the half brother of Sir Hector Maclean, 7th Baronet. Both Hector and Fitzroy were the sons of Donald Maclean of Brolas who was married first to Mary Dickson, and later to Margaret Wall(?). Fitzroy is the son from the second marriage. Donald Maclean was the great grandson of Donald MacLean, 1st Laird of Brolas through Brolas' son Hector.

On 24 September 1787, he obtained his commission as ensign in the twenty-ninth regiment, and rapidly rose to the rank of General, passing through the following grades: Lieutenant, 19 June 1788; Captain, 15 July 1793; Major, March, 1795; Lieutenant-Colonel, 18 November 1795; Colonel, 25 September 1803; Major-General, 25 July. 1810; Lieutenant- General, 4 June 1814; General, 10 January 1837.

In 1793, he was at the capture of the island of Tobago and in the attack on Martinique. In 1803. he was appointed commandant of the Batavians, who were received into the British service on the surrender of the Dutch West India colonies. In the expedition for the capture of Surinam, he commanded the advanced corps of the army. In 1805, he was at the capture of the Danish islands of St. Thomas and St. John, the government of which was conferred upon him in 1808, and continued as such until 1815. His administration of the affairs of those islands, his impartial conduct, mild sway, and kind disposition, were such as to endear him to all classes of the inhabitants, and when he took his departure, it was amidst the universal regret of the people. For his gallant behavior at the capture of the island of Gaudaloupe, in 1810, he received and was permitted to wear a medal.

In June 1815 he returned to Europe, after passing, with very little interval, a period of twenty-eight years on active service in the hot climate of the West Indies. On his return he resided chiefly in London. In 1794, he married the widow of John Bishop of Barbados, the only child of Charles Kidd, and by her had several children, all of whom died in childhood except Sir Charles Fitzroy Maclean, 9th Baronet (born 1798) and Donald Maclean (born 1800). His wife died in 1832, and on 17 September 1838 he married Frances, widow of Henry Campion, of Sussex. Sir Fitzroy MacLean died on 5 July 1847 and was succeeded by his son Charles.

Military offices
Preceded by Sir Denis Pack	Colonel of the 84th (York and Lancaster) Regiment of Foot; 1823–1840	Succeeded by Sir Loftus William Otway
Baronetage of Nova Scotia
Preceded by Hector Maclean	Baronet (of Duart and Morvern); 1818–1847	Succeeded by Charles Maclean
