= Aeneas Macpherson of Invereshie =

Scottish author (1644–1705)

Sir Aeneas Macpherson of Invereshie (1645 - 1705) was a Scottish author.

== Biography ==
Coat of arms of the MacPherson of Invereshie.

He compiled Sliochd nan Triuir Bhraithrean, or Posteritie of the Three Brethren, a genealogical work compiled during the latter half of the 17th century. In the work he identifies Duncan lóm McPherson of Strathmashie, as "a great genealoger" and it is possible that he helped compile the work.

Having been a courtier to Charles II and James II Aeneas Macpherson was appointed Governor of Nevis in 1688. Following the Glorious Revolution of that year he became a leading Jacobite agent, moving to James II's court in exile in France. In 1698 he returned to Britain, where he lived incognito, and in 1701 wrote The Loyall Dissuasive in London, followed by Supplement to the Dissuasive, written in Edinburgh in 1704.
