= Donald Maclean, 1st Laird of Brolas =

Scottish Laird of Clan MacLean

Donald MacLean, 1st Laird of Brolas
- Born: c. 1600
- Died: after 1655
- Title: Laird of Brolas
- Successor: Lauchlan Maclean, 2nd Laird of Brolas, son
- Children: Lauchlan Maclean, 2nd Laird of Brolas
- Parent: Hector Og Maclean, 15th Clan Chief
- Relatives: John Hans Makeléer, brother Donald Maclean of Brolas, great-grandson

Donald MacLean, 1st Laird of Brolas (c. 1600 – after 1655), was a Scottish Laird of Clan MacLean who fought in the Battle of Inverkeithing. He was the first Laird of Brolas.

== Early years ==
His father was Hector Og Maclean, 15th Clan Chief and his mother was a daughter of Sir Archibald Acheson, 1st Baronet. Donald was the first son of Hector's second marriage. His brother was John Hans Makeléer.

== Marriage and children ==
He married Florence Maclean, the daughter of John Garbh Maclean, 7th Laird of Coll and had the following children:

- Lauchlan Maclean, 2nd Laird of Brolas, who was the Member of Parliament for Argyllshire. His descendant, Sir Allan Maclean, 6th Baronet, became the Clan Chief when the previous chief died without an heir.
- Mor Maclean of Brolas
- Hector Og Maclean of Brolas, who married Janet, daughter of MacNeil of Barra. He had a son, John Maclean of Brolas who married Finovia of Garmony. John Maclean of Brolas then had as his son, Donald Maclean of Brolas who married and had Sir Hector Maclean, 7th Baronet. Donald married a second time and had Sir Fitzroy Jeffreys Grafton Maclean, 8th Baronet.

== Ancestors ==
Donald Maclean, 1st Laird of Brolas's ancestors in three generations
Donald Maclean, 1st Laird of Brolas	Father: Hector Og Maclean, 15th Clan Chief	Paternal Grandfather: Sir Lachlan Mor Maclean	Paternal Great-Grandfather: Eachuinn Og Maclean
Donald Maclean, 1st Laird of Brolas	Father: Hector Og Maclean, 15th Clan Chief	Paternal Grandfather: Sir Lachlan Mor Maclean	Paternal Great-grandmother: Janet, daughter of Archibald Campbell, 4th Earl of Argyll
Donald Maclean, 1st Laird of Brolas	Father: Hector Og Maclean, 15th Clan Chief	Paternal Grandmother: Margaret Cunningham of Glencairn	Paternal Great-Grandfather: William Cunningham, 6th Earl of Glencairn
Donald Maclean, 1st Laird of Brolas	Father: Hector Og Maclean, 15th Clan Chief	Paternal Grandmother: Margaret Cunningham of Glencairn	Paternal Great-Grandmother: Janet, daughter of Sir John Gordon of Lochinvar
Donald Maclean, 1st Laird of Brolas	Mother: Isabella Acheson of Gosford	Maternal Grandfather: Sir Archibald Acheson, 1st Baronet	Maternal Great-Grandfather: Captain Patrick Acheson
Donald Maclean, 1st Laird of Brolas	Mother: Isabella Acheson of Gosford	Maternal Grandfather: Sir Archibald Acheson, 1st Baronet	Maternal Great-Grandmother:
Donald Maclean, 1st Laird of Brolas	Mother: Isabella Acheson of Gosford	Maternal Grandmother: Agnes Vernor or Margaret Hamilton	Maternal Great-grandfather:
Donald Maclean, 1st Laird of Brolas	Mother: Isabella Acheson of Gosford	Maternal Grandmother: Agnes Vernor or Margaret Hamilton	Maternal Great-Grandmother:
