= Sir Fitzroy Maclean, 10th Baronet =

26th Chief of Clan Maclean (1835–1936)

Sir Fitzroy Maclean Bt KCB

26th Clan Chief 10th Baronet of Morvern
- In office 1883–1936
- Preceded by: Sir Charles Fitzroy Maclean, 9th Baronet
- Succeeded by: Sir Charles Hector Fitzroy Maclean, 11th Baronet

Personal details
- Born: Fitzroy Donald Maclean; 18 May 1835 near Shorne, County Kent
- Died: 22 November 1936 (aged 101) Duart Castle
- Spouse: Constance Marianne Ackers (m. 1872-1920; her death)
- Children: 5, including Major Hector Fitzroy Maclean (1873–1932)
- Parent(s): Sir Charles Fitzroy Maclean, 9th Baronet; Emily Marsham
- Relatives: Sir Charles Hector Fitzroy Maclean, 11th Baronet (grandson)

Colonel Sir Fitzroy Donald Maclean, 10th Baronet of Morvern, KCB, DL (18 May 1835 – 22 November 1936) was a Scottish officer who served as the 26th Clan Chief of Clan Maclean from 1883 to 1936, for fifty-three years. He lived to be 101 years old. He bought and restored Duart Castle in 1911 as the seat of the Maclean clan.

== Biography ==
He was born on 18 May 1835 near Shorne, County Kent, the only son of Sir Charles Fitzroy Maclean, 9th Baronet, the 25th Chief of Clan Maclean.

He started his military career as a cornet at the 7th Dragoon Guards. On 12 October 1852, he was promoted to lieutenant of the 13th Light Dragoons. In 1854, he was promoted to captain and in 1856 was promoted to major. In 1861, he was promoted to lieutenant-colonel. By 1871, he was commanding the 13th Hussars. He was promoted to colonel and commanded the Queen's Own West Kent Yeomanry Cavalry in 1880. In 1854–1855, he served in Bulgaria and the Crimea, and was with his regiment at the landing at Yevpatoria. He also fought at the Battle of the Alma and the Siege of Sevastopol. He was not able to participate in the Charge of the Light Brigade due to becoming sick shortly before the engagement.

Sir Fitzroy married Constance Marianne Ackers (c. 1840–1920) on 17 January 1872. She was the younger daughter of George Holland Ackers, the High Sheriff of Cheshire. Their children were:

- Major Hector Fitzroy Maclean (17 Feb 1873 – 25 July 1932), the father of Sir Charles Hector Fitzroy Maclean, 11th Baronet. He married Winifred Joan Wilding, the daughter of J. H. Wilding, on 3 September 1907. Died at the age of 59.
- Charles Lachlan Maclean (20 September 1874 – 27 August 1958)
- Fitzroy Holland Maclean (10 May 1876 – 13 April 1881)
- John Marsham Maclean (24 October 1879 – 4 November 1901), killed in action in the Boer War at the age of 22.
- Finovola Marianne Eleanor Maclean (14 February 1887 – 1985), married Captain Roger Cordy-Simpson on 7 April 1908. After he died in 1919, she married secondly Brigadier Francis William Bullock-Marsham (1883–1971) on 19 April 1922.

He became the 10th Baronet of Morvern and 26th Clan Chief in 1883 on the death of his father, Sir Charles Fitzroy Maclean, 9th Baronet, who was the 25th Chief of Clan Maclean.

He was invested as a Companion of the Order of the Bath (CB) on 22 June 1897. On 24 June 1904, he was knighted in the same order (KCB), and in December 1910, was appointed a deputy lieutenant of Kent.

He bought Duart Castle in September 1911 and restored it. On his 100th birthday he planted a rowan tree in the castle grounds to ward off evil spirits. He lived to be 101 years old. On his death on 22 November 1936 his title went to his grandson, Sir Charles Hector Fitzroy Maclean, 11th Baronet, who became the 27th Clan Chief.

He was Grand President of the Clan Gillean Association, honorary president of the Mull and Iona Association, vice-president and formerly president of the Highland Society of London. He was appointed a deputy lieutenant for Argyllshire in 1932.

== Heraldry ==
Coat of arms of Sir Fitzroy Maclean, 10th Baronet
Notes The quartering of the lymphad, embattled tower, salmon, and eagles' heads are characteristic of west highland heraldry. It has been suggested that the eagles' heads may represent the hawks which Maclean chiefs supplied to kings of Scots on certain occasions. The rock may represent Cairnburgh, in the Treshnish Isles. Crest A tower embattled argent. Torse Gules doubled argent. Helm A helmet befitting his degree. Escutcheon Quarterly, 1st, argent a rock gules; 2nd, argent, a dexter hand fesswise couped gules, holding a cross crosslet fitche in pale azure; 3rd, Or, a lymphad oars in saltire sails furled sable flagged gules; 4th argent, a salmon naiant proper in chief two eagles heads erased respectant gules. Supporters Dexter, a seal proper. Sinister, an ostrich with a horseshoe in its beak proper. Motto Virtue mine honour (on an escrol over the crest).

Baronetage of Nova Scotia
Preceded by Charles Fitzroy Maclean	Baronet (of Duart and Morvern); 1883–1936	Succeeded by Charles Fitzroy Maclean
