= Hector Maclean, 2nd Laird of Torloisk =

Hector MacLean, 2nd Laird of Torloisk
- Born: Hector MacLean
- Title: Laird of Torloisk
- Predecessor: Lachlan Og MacLean, 1st Laird of Torloisk, father
- Successor: Lachlan Maclean, 3rd Laird of Torloisk
- Parent: Lachlan Og MacLean, 1st Laird of Torloisk

Hector MacLean, 2nd Laird of Torloisk was the second Laird of Torloisk.

== Biography ==
He was the son of Lachlan Og MacLean, 1st Laird of Torloisk

He was first married to Jannet, daughter of Allan Maclean of Ardtornish, by whom he had three daughters:

- Margaret Maclean of Torloisk, married to Lachlan Maclean of Lochbuie
- Marian Maclean of Torloisk, married to Hector Roy MacLean of Coll, son of John Garbh Maclean, 7th Laird of Coll
- Mary Maclean of Torloisk, married to Duncan Campbell of Sandaig.

He was a second time married to Catherine, daughter of John Campbell of Lochnell, and had children:

- Lachlan Maclean, 3rd Laird of Torloisk, who succeeded him
- Hector Maclean of Torloisk, who was killed by Clan Maclachlan, a band of robbers of Fiairt, in Lesmore, who infested the neighborhood
- John of Tarbert who was married to Catherine, daughter of Donald Campbell of Comguish, by whom he had Donald Maclean, 5th Laird of Torloisk, John, and Marianne who married Charles MacLean of Kilunaig
- Isabella Maclean of Torloisk, married to Lauchlan Maclean, 2nd Laird of Brolas
- Jannet Maclean of Torloisk, married to Hector MacLean 2nd Laird of Kinlochaline.
