= Lachlan Og Maclean, 1st Laird of Torloisk =

Lachlan Og MacLean, 1st Laird of Torloisk
- Title: Laird of Torloisk
- Successor: Hector MacLean, 2nd Laird of Torloisk
- Spouses: Marian, daughter of Sir Duncan Campbell of Achnabreck; Margaret, daughter of Captain Stewart of Dumbarton; Marian, daughter of Donald MacDonald of Clanranald
- Parent: Sir Lachlan Mor Maclean

Lachlan Og MacLean, 1st Laird of Torloisk was the second son of Sir Lachlan Mor Maclean and the first Laird of Torloisk.

== Biography ==
He was the second son of Sir Lachlan Mor Maclean, and he received from his father a charter of the lands of Lehire-Torloisk, forfeited by the son of Ailean nan Sop, which was afterward confirmed by royal grant. He was present at the Battle of Gruinnart, and was severely wounded. He was a witness to a charter given by his father to Martin MacGillivray of Pennyghael, and subscribed himself in the Irish characters, Mise Lachin Mhac Gilleoin. He was an important man in his day, and was so influential that he was compelled to make his appearance before the privy council.

He was first married to Marian, daughter of Sir Duncan Campbell of Achnabreck and had:

- Hector MacLean, 2nd Laird of Torloisk

He was a second time married to Margaret, daughter of Captain Stewart of Dumbarton, but had no children.
He was a third time married to Marian, daughter of Donald MacDonald of Clanranald, and had:

- Hector Maclean
- Lachlan Og Maclean, who died unmarried but had a son Donald Maclean
- Lachlan Catanach Maclean was killed at Inverkeithing
- Ewen Maclean
- John Diuriach Maclean married the daughter of John Maclean, Laird of Ardgour and had Allan and several daughters

Other children include:

- Allan Maclean who died unmarried at Harris
- Neil Maclean who married a daughter of Lochbuie, by whom he had a daughter
- Lachlan, who died a lieutenant-colonel in the British service
- Jannet Maclean, married Hector, first MacLean of Kinlochaline
- Mary Maclean, married John Garbh, eldest son of John Dubh of Morvern
- Catherine Maclean, married John, brother to MacNeil of Barra
- Julian Maclean, married Allan MacLean, brother of Lochbuie
- Isabella Maclean, married Martin MacGillivray of Pennyghael

Lachlan Og lived to an advanced age, and was succeeded by his eldest son, Hector MacLean, 2nd Laird of Torloisk.
