= John McLean (disambiguation) =

John McLean (1785–1861) was an American jurist and politician.

John McLean may also refer to:

== Politics ==
- John McLean (Illinois politician) (1791–1830), Illinois politician and U.S. Senator
- John McLean Jr. (1793–1858), New York politician
- John McLean (New Zealand politician) (1818–1902), member of the New Zealand Legislative Council
- John Donald McLean (1820–1866), politician and colonial Treasurer of Queensland
- John McLean (Canadian politician) (1846–1936), Canadian politician from Prince Edward Island
- John R. McLean (Canadian politician) (1906–1964), merchant and political figure on Prince Edward Island

== Sports ==
- John McLean (athlete) (1878–1955), American Olympic athlete and head football coach at Missouri, 1903–1905
- John McLean (rower) (1859–1925), Australian sculler
- Jock McLean (John Calderwood McLean, 1908–1988), Scottish footballer
- John McLean (footballer, born 1872) (1872–?), Scottish footballer
- John McLean (footballer, born 1877) (1877–1958), Scottish footballer
- Johnny McLean (1881–?), Scottish footballer

== Other ==
- John McLean (merchant) (1761–1823), Massachusetts merchant, major donor to the Massachusetts General Hospital and Harvard University
- John McLean (furniture maker) (1770–1825), English Upholder and cabinet maker
- John McLean (explorer) (c. 1799–1890), Scoto-Canadian trapper, explorer, and author
- John McLean (bishop) (1828–1866), first Bishop of Saskatchewan
- John R. McLean (publisher) (1848–1916), owner of The Washington Post, The Cincinnati Enquirer, and the Great Falls and Old Dominion Railroad
- John Walford McLean (1925–2009), British dentist
- Jackie McLean (John Lenwood McLean, 1931–2006), American jazz saxophonist
- John McLean (1851–1928), Scoto-Canadian Methodist minister and author who later changed his name to John Maclean
- John McLean (artist) (1944–2023), New Zealand artist

== See also ==
- John McClane, fictional character played by Bruce Willis in the 1988 film Die Hard
- John McLane, American politician
- Jack McLean (disambiguation)
- John MacLean (disambiguation)
- John McClean (disambiguation)
