= Archaeology of Saskatchewan =

Archaeology in Saskatchewan, Canada, is supported by professional and amateur interest, privately funded and not-for-profit organizations, and governmental and citizen co-operation with the primary incentive to encourage archaeological awareness and interest in the heritage that defines the province to this date. The landscape of Saskatchewan hosts substantial prehistoric (pre-contact; before 1690 C.E.) and historic (after the start of European exploration; after 1690 C.E.) sites.

The majority of the information on Saskatchewan's archaeological history has been compiled into the publication in celebration of the province's centennial in 2005. It was implemented by the Ministry of Tourism, Parks, Culture and Sport (formerly the Department of Culture, Youth and Recreation) of the Government of Saskatchewan and involves the collaboration of the Saskatchewan Association of Professional Archaeologists (SAPA). The project was funded by the Saskatchewan Heritage Foundation, Golder Associates, SaskPower, Stantec Consulting Ltd., and Western Heritage Files inducted into the project are currently managed by the Saskatchewan Heritage Branch. According to this publication, human life in Saskatchewan dates back 12,000 years and, as of 2005, there were more than 20,000 officially recognized archaeological sites in Saskatchewan. Although Saskatchewan joined Confederation in 1905, its archaeological roots clearly precede and proceed its legal foundation.

The Encyclopedia of Saskatchewan affirms that in Saskatchewan today "field archaeology is controlled by the provincial government, requiring pre-development assessments. The result is that most of the field work in archaeology now is done by consultants, whose activities are regulated by the government."

== General history ==
=== 1850s to the 1900s ===
Archaeology in Saskatchewan originated in the 1850s as a scientific initiative to explore the past relationships among fur traders, explorers and aboriginal cultures. What was originally explored in the Qu'Appelle River region were phenomenon later understood to be manufactured by the Cree, including earthen mounds and stone rings that were correctly interpreted to be previous tipi sites. In 1896, Reverend John Maclean recorded a monumental site near Moose Mountain, although at the time of discovery he could not determine the purpose of the site.

=== 1900s to the 1920s ===
There was a motivational shift from scientific knowledge to personal curiosity by the early 1900s. In 1905, Charles Noddings made a notable find near Beaver Hills involving a similar set up to Maclean's stone monument find at Moose Mountain along with a number of stone carvings. Noddings was one of the first residents in Saskatchewan to advocate for the protection of an archaeological site by pressuring the provincial government at the time. This "sustain[ed] public interest in Saskatchewan archaeology until the development of an archaeological program in the 1950s." Within that same time frame, burial mounds were also being discovered in Saskatchewan. Field work and research conducted by Dr. Henry Montgomery from the University of Toronto concluded with the first scholarly publication of archaeological literature for Saskatchewan. Other than the cases of Noddings and Montgomery, curiosity, and little scientific backing, fueled archaeological interest until the end of the 1920s.

=== 1930s to the 1950s ===
The drought experienced across the plains in 1930s exposed various remnants of human occupation including but not excluded to pottery and tools of people who have inhabited the Great Plains. Developments with artifacts of the same nature in New Mexico traced human occupation back 10,000 years, resulting in the simultaneous extension of Saskatchewan archaeological finds back to 10,000 years at minimum. Artifact recovery became a popular extracurricular activity as it was not limited by the economy. A renewed public interest in archaeology prompted the founding of the Saskatchewan Archaeological Society (SAS) in 1933. By 1935, the society was based out of Regina and Saskatoon. To the best of their ability, the SAS established a newsletter to be distributed to the public and identified artifacts on minimal professional expertise and funding since the conditions of World War II hindered any institutional support for years.

Spanning from the 1920s to the 1940s, Arthur Morton merged history and archaeology in his studies of the fur trade, followed by John Archer in 1949 and Jack Herbert in 1951. Morton's actions arranged protection for the remainder of fur trade posts near Nipawin, whereas Archer and Herbert both explored historic sites and together launched a provincial historic sites service.

Archaeology in Saskatchewan from the 1950s onward was defined by the endeavors of Boyd Wettlaufer, the proclaimed "Father of Saskatchewan Archaeology." He was an influential voice in acquiring knowledge of the North Plains First Nations. Wettlaufer's key role in Saskatchewan archaeology was centered on the Long Creek sites located south of Regina near Estevan. He illustrated differences "between various hunting and gathering cultures [from] several thousand years ago." Wettlaufer was one of the first archaeologists in Canada to use radiocarbon dating, successfully fought for a lab to be established in Western Canada at the University of Saskatchewan, and the first archaeologist in Saskatchewan to conduct an archaeological survey.

=== 1960s to the present ===
Alice Beck Kehoe orchestrated the first major historic site excavation in Saskatchewan at the François-Finlay posts discovered by Morton earlier on.

Interactions from institutions such as the Royal Saskatchewan Museum (previously known as the Saskatchewan Museum of Natural History) and the University of Saskatchewan impacted the archaeological scene in Saskatchewan. The Royal Saskatchewan Museum took on mass excavation initiatives that had relations to aboriginal sites in areas such as Swift Current and the South Saskatchewan River. After the establishment of their Anthropology and Archaeology department, the University of Saskatchewan began organizing larger-scale archaeological initiatives by 1967.

In the 1970s, the Government of Saskatchewan introduced the Archaeological Resource Management (RAM) as a part of environmental impact assessment. The RAM was created to provide scientifically accurate information that has added substantial data to the overall information base, contributing to the verification of hypotheses and strengthening of theories focused on cultural movements and habitation choices. The Saskatchewan RAM has been "unusually successful in stimulating archaeological explanations" due to the work of consulting archaeologists "and the influence of regulatory agencies who have ensured explanatory requirements in contractual terms for the projects."

== Heritage Property Act ==
The Encyclopedia of Saskatchewan states that one of the biggest recent changes to archaeology in Saskatchewan has been "the enactment and enforcement of heritage legislation, beginning in 1980.

The Ministry of Tourism, Parks, Culture and Sport (TPCS) has outlined what constitutes heritage in Saskatchewan. Heritage is understood to be archaeological objects, paleontological objects, property of interest for its architectural, historical, cultural, environmental, archaeological, palaeontological, aesthetic or scientific value.

The Heritage Property Act protects, conserves and develops heritage property in Saskatchewan, giving authority to the Government of Saskatchewan and the Government of Canada to "protect and regulate" heritage property. According to the Government of Saskatchewan's website on the Act, there are a number of key provisions for protecting heritage sites. In the context of archaeology, these include:

- Covenants and Easements (s.59) entitles the municipality, the provincial government or any approved heritage organization to enter a covenant or easement - an agreement between parties where one party has rights to the land over the other to "protect and conserve natural features, wildlife habitats or other heritage values" through the Ecological Gifts Program - for the only purpose of protecting heritage property.
- Crown Ownership (s.66) defines archaeological and palaeontological objects found in Saskatchewan as important scientific and humanistic public resources that benefit all people of Saskatchewan and Canada. The Provincial Crown claims, in public trust, ownership of those items and prohibits "unauthorized sale or removal from the province."
- Sites of a Special Nature (SSNs) are afforded special protection. No person can remove, excavate or alter a site of special nature unless they have an authorized permit. SSNs are typically associated with First Nations and Metis people as they protect "ongoing traditional cultural practices and beliefs" through developments like ancient rock paintings, human burial places, boulder effigies, and medicine wheels to name a few.

* Sites like Moose Mountain and the Gray Burial Site are subject to this provision.
* Many SSNs are among Saskatchewan's most outstanding archaeological monuments.

- Impact Assessment and Mitigation (s.63) prevents any activity or operation that disturbs or damages heritage property. In order to do so, one must carry out an impact assessment study, submit that report, and take any other appropriate measures or actions to preserve a heritage property. The municipality or organization that wants to act upon heritage property must refrain from doing so until the required impact assessment has been officially completed.
- Temporary Stop Order (s.4) requires the person who is engaging in an activity that will disturb or damage heritage property to temporarily stop for up to a 60-day period. During that time, "alternatives to destruction will be investigated and acted upon" if necessary.
- Investigation Permits (s.67) "are required for any heritage research or resource management activity" and are signed by the responsible Minister if the terms and conditions are appropriate.
- Penalties include fines of up to $250,000 (in the case of a corporation) or up to $5,000 (in the case of an individual), a 6-month term of imprisonment, or both, if any person is guilty of a provisional offense of the Heritage Property Act.

== Federal involvement in Saskatchewan archaeology ==
The Canadian government is involved in archaeology within Saskatchewan in three fundamental ways.

- The Canadian Environmental Assessment Agency supports sustainable development through high-quality environmental assessments that lead to informed decision making and is held accountable to the Minister of the Environment. The Agency was established in 1994 so that the Canadian Environmental Assessment Act could be implemented in 1995.
- The Canadian Environmental Assessment Act (1995) is the legal basis for the federal environmental process. "Regulations under the Act are used to determine if the Act applies and what type of environmental assessment is required" to which governmental assessment processes, departments and agencies are coordinated under the Act and accordingly respond to various archaeological scenarios.
- Canada-Saskatchewan Historic Places Initiative allows Saskatchewan to participate in protecting Canada's historic sites within its provincial boundaries. Saskatchewan has agreed to objects and outcomes such as fostering cultural heritage conservation, private sector partnership and investment, "providing Canadians with basic tools to protect heritage, and encouraging governments to model custodians of historic places."

== Examples of archaeological sites in Saskatchewan ==
=== Gray Burial Site ===
The Gray Burial Site is a pre-contact traditional burial ground that was used by hunters who inhabited the northern Swift Current region between 3500 and 1000 B.C.E. Between 1970 and 1974, the site underwent archaeological excavations and was declared a National Historic site (1973) for it is one of the oldest burial grounds in the Plains at 5,000 years old.

=== Moose Mountain Medicine Wheel ===
Alice Kehoe Beck wrote about the Moose Mountain stone site in her book 'Controversies in Archaeology' (2008) and identified its purpose within the sub-discipline of archaeoastronomy, later confirming the purpose of the site that Maclean failed to account for.)

== See also ==
- Saskatchewan Archaeological Society
- Archaeological ethics
- Canadian Environmental Assessment Act
- Canadian Environmental Assessment Agency
- Culture of Saskatchewan
- History of Saskatchewan
- Royal Saskatchewan Museum
- Saskatchewan Archaeological Society
