= John Walford =

John Walford may refer to:

- John Walford (cricketer) (1899–1961), English cricketer
- John Walford (librarian) (1906–2000), British Librarian, bibliographer, and editor
- John Walford McLean (1925-2009), British dentist
