= Wettlaufer =

Wettlaufer is a surname. Notable people with the surname include:

- Boyd Wettlaufer (1914–2009), Canadian archaeologist
- Elizabeth Wettlaufer (born 1967), Canadian nurse and serial killer
- Paul Wettlaufer (born 1978), Canadian field hockey player
- Robin Wettlaufer, Canadian representative
- Ward Wettlaufer (born 1935), American golfer
- Wayne Wettlaufer (born 1943), Canadian politician
