= John MacLean =

John MacLean or John Maclean is the name of:

== Arts and entertainment ==
- John MacLean, known as The Juan MacLean, American musician, formerly of Six Finger Satellite
- John Maclean (film director) (born 1972), Scottish film director, screenwriter and musician, formerly of The Beta Band
- Sir John MacLean (historian) (1811–1895), British civil servant and author
- John Maclean (photographer), British photographer
- John Bayne Maclean (1862–1950), Canadian publisher
- John N. Maclean (born 1943), author of Fire on the Mountain: The True Story of the South Canyon Fire

== Politics ==
- John MacLean (Manitoba politician) (1929–1987), Canadian Member of Parliament
- John Maclean (Scottish socialist) (1879–1923), Scottish political figure
- John Duncan MacLean (1873–1948), former Premier of the Canadian province of British Columbia
- Sir John Maclean, 1st Baronet (1604–1666), Scottish naval officer and merchant who moved to Sweden and took the name John Hans Makeléer
- Sir John Maclean, 4th Baronet (1670–1716), Scottish noble who was the 20th Clan Chief of Clan Maclean from 1674 to 1716
- John Dubh Maclean, 4th Chief of Clan MacLean (14th century)
- John Dubh Maclean, 1st Laird of Morvern (16th century), founder of the Macleans of Kinlochaine, Drimnin, and Pennycross
- John Garbh Maclean, 1st Laird of Coll (1668–1756), as an independent unit
- John Garbh Maclean, 7th Laird of Coll, 17th century Scottish official
- John MacLean (honorary sheriff) (1860–1940), pioneer and sheriff in Última Esperanza Province, Chile

== Sports ==
- John Maclean (Australian cricketer) (1946–2026), Australian cricketer
- John MacLean (English cricketer) (1901–1986), English cricketer
- John MacLean (ice hockey) (born 1964), ice hockey player and coach
- John MacLean (sportscaster) (1921–1973), Major League Baseball announcer
- John Maclean (sportsperson) (born 1966), Australian triathlete, rower, and motivational speaker

== Other ==
- John Maclean Jr. (1800–1886), president of Princeton University
- John Patterson MacLean (1848–1939), American Universalist minister, archaeologist and historian
- John Maclean (pastor) (1851–1928), Canadian pastor and writer on American-Indians
- John Norman Maclean (minister) (1862–1941), Canadian-American Presbyterian minister

== See also ==
- John McClane, fictional character played by Bruce Willis in the 1988 film Die Hard
- John McLean (disambiguation)
- John McClean (disambiguation)
- John Dubh Maclean (disambiguation)
- John Garbh Maclean (disambiguation)
- Sir John Maclean (disambiguation)
