= Avonlea culture =

Pre-Columbian culture in Canada and the United States

- Horizon: Late Woodland period
- Geographical range: Saskatchewan and Alberta in Canada and Montana in the U.S.
- Dates: c. 460–1400 CE
- Type site: Avonlea site
- Preceded by: Besant culture
- Followed by: Old Women's phase

The Avonlea culture is a pre-Columbian archaeological culture of the upper Great Plains of Canada and the United States. It is defined by complexes of projectile points, pottery, and other artifacts discovered in archaeological sites concentrated in southern Alberta and Saskatchewan and in northern Montana. The culture has been dated to approximately 460 CE and lasted until about 800 to 1000 CE, making it a horizon culture for the beginning of the Late Woodland period.

Its type site is the Avonlea site in Saskatchewan, Canada. The Avonlea complex, traditionally associated with buffalo jumps and their associated occupation sites, provides some of the first evidence for large-scale bison hunting and the use of the bow and arrow on the northern Great Plains.

== Dating ==
Initial estimates of projectile points associated with the Avonlea culture placed it within the Late Woodland period. The first radiocarbon dating of charcoal samples from an associated stratigraphic layer at the Avonlea site returned a date of c. 460 CE and estimated the culture might have lasted as long as 800–1200 CE. Estimations in the 1990s suggested the culture may date to c. 100–1100 CE, but a 2004 paper limits this range to 500–1000 CE. Most archaeological material dates to c. 600–1000 CE.

== Cultural interactions ==
=== Origins ===
An origin culture for the Avonlea complex has not been conclusively determined. Early studies note that the emergence of the Avonlea complex seems to correspond with the migration of Dené populations from the north towards the upper Great Plains. These movements may have influenced the development of the Avonlea point among the indigenous Besant culture of the Middle Woodland period. Tom Kehoe, who published the earliest analyses on Avonlea material, suggested the Dené might have been the creators of the Avonlea point; however, this has been heavily disputed. Lack of early Avonlea presence on the northern reaches of the Great Plains, from the direction the Dené are believed to have travelled, as well as the earliest points being found in the southern Canadian Great Plains suggests this as the birthplace of the Avonlea complex.

In 1979, Grace Morgan introduced a theory that Avonlea was brought to the area by migrants from the Upper Mississippi River Valley to the south.

=== Spread and contacts ===
As their influence grew, the Avonlea culture spread southwards into the Wyoming Basin and the middle Missouri River Valley by 400–600 CE, and eastwards into modern-day Minnesota and Manitoba. Evidence exists of contacts between the Avonlea and Ojibwe and Cree cultures. Rather than being associated with one ethnic group, the Avonlea points may have been adopted by a wide variety of cultures. Avonlea is also closely associated with the Old Women's phase of arrowhead points, which arose out of Alberta c. 600–700 CE and persisted until about 1800 CE.

There is also evidence that the Avonlea interacted with the Laurel culture of the Saskatchewan boreal forest at the northernmost reaches of the Avonlea culture. Avonlea-associated pottery has been found at Laurel sites and vice versa. As these boundary sites were inhabited only during spring and summer, interaction would have taken place during those seasons.

In 1967, Wilfred Husted and Oscar Mallory proposed a potential contact between the Avonlea and Fremont/Shoshone cultures. At sites like Ghost Cave and the Mangus site in the Bighorn Canyon of Montana and Wyoming, Avonlea points were found amongst traditional Shoshone artifacts.

The Avonlea culture is also associated with the later Initial Middle Missouri horizon. At the Mitchell Site in South Dakota, which dates to that period, three Avonlea points have been recovered. As this site is a relative outlier to the usual Avonlea range, according to Karr et al., this might suggest "long-distance cultural exchange". Additionally, fortified sites have been uncovered elsewhere in South Dakota, Montana, and Wyoming, dating to about 800–1000 CE; a William Prentiss and James Chatters suggested that Avonlea populations moved southwards, where they engaged in conflicts against the Middle Missourians. This is further supported by evidence of increased local warfare during this period. These fortifications may have been built during the Southern Athabascan split, when tribes like the Navajo and Apache migrated south from their origins in modern-day northwestern Canada.

=== Decline ===
Over time, Avonlea points were slowly phased out in favor of newer point types. Beginning about 700 CE, the Algonquians to the east began moving into Avonlea territory and introduced the Prairie Side-notched type. The Avonlea culture lasted broadly until about 800–1000 CE, but phased out at different times in different regions. Radiocarbon dating in 1988 found that Avonlea may have persisted as late as 900 CE in central Saskatchewan, 1100 CE in eastern Montana and the Dakotas, 1300 CE in southern Saskatchewan, and 1400 CE in Montana and British Columbia. By 1300 CE, Mississippian peoples moving northwestwards onto the Great Plains had replaced the Avonlea points with the Plains Side-notched type. The Old Women's phase eventually replaced Avonlea.

== Projectile points ==
The Avonlea culture has been described as a horizon, a culture which has a broad geographical distribution and a presence well-defined by a distinct art style. Within the culture, individual points make up a complex, sometimes referred to as a horizon style; and the culture as a whole may constitute several regional variants. For the Avonlea culture, the projectile points are the single most defining feature, although other stone tools and pottery sherds are also associated with the culture.

=== Typology ===
Avonlea points were first identified as a unique complex by Boyd Wettlaufer during the late 1950s. The first detailed analysis of the Avonlea complex was made by Thomas Kehoe and Bruce McCorqudale in 1961. In 1966, Kehoe broke the Avonlea complex down into three varieties: Gull Lake, Timber Ridge Sharp-notched, and Carmichael Wide-eared. These types fall into the broader scope of late side-notched projectile points, a classification range that covers Northern Great Plains points dated from 1250 Before Present (BP) to the modern era.

The Gull Lake type is the classical and most widespread variant. It is the oldest of the three types; at the Gull Lake site for which it is named, the oldest associated stratigraphic layer was dated to about 210 ± 60 CE. It is also the most delicate, being smaller, lighter, and flatter than the other two variants.

The Carmichael Wide-eared variant is found less frequently than the Gull Lake type. As its name implies, it is distinguished by the presence of larger, wider, rounded notches and basal corners (or "ears"). Dating of associated layers returned a date of about 730 ± 80 CE.

The rarest type is the Timber Ridge Sharp-notched variant. These points account for about 3% of all Avonlea finds at the Gull Lake site but seem to be more frequent in southern sites, such as in Montana. This variety is longer but thinner than the Carmichael type and has a distinctly sharp-cornered base. It is dated to around 660–800 CE based on dating at two different sites.

A fourth type, the Head-Smashed-In variant, was defined in 1983. Unlike every other type, these points contain corner notches, rather than side notches.

==== Type system ====
Kehoe also suggested sorting these small projectile points of the upper Great Plains into a type system reflecting the shared overall function of the points—that is, large game hunting—which he called the Plains Small Side-notched Point System. Associated types included the Prairie Side-notched and Plains Side-notched; Avonlea points are differentiated from these due to the placement of the latter's notches lower on the corners of the points. Together, this complex represents an array of point types which emphasizes basal concavity, where earlier Middle Woodland period points trended towards convex bases; a base approximately as wide as the blade, as opposed to earlier complexes' universally wider blades; the diminishing thickness of the base; and several other distinguishing characteristics.

=== Description ===
Avonlea-associated projectile points are characterized by distinctions in their diminutive size, side notches, and triangular shape, and they are the earliest such examples to be recorded on the northern Great Plains.

The initial batch of 176 points studied by Kehoe and McCorquodale found the points had an average size of 12 mm (0.47 in), width of 13.4 mm (0.53 in), thickness of 2.47 mm (0.097 in), and weight of 0.6 grams (0.021 oz). The most popular materials were chert, quartzite, and flint. This differs from later cultures' inclination towards petrified wood and chalcedony, although these stones are still represented among Avonlea lithics. Material sources seem to have been local, and makers did not travel far or trade for their preferred stone. They also were apparently unaware of, or at least did not use, the flint quarries along the Knife River to the south, which had been worked by both earlier and later cultures.

During the knapping process, Avonlea points are produced from thin blanks, which in turn produces a very shallow slope down to the sides when it is flaked. Two symmetrical V- or U-shaped notches, one on each side, are chiseled low on the base of the point. Of the 176 samples studied by Kehoe and McCorqudale, placement of the notches averaged about 3 mm (0.12 in) from the base. These notches reached an average width of 2.76 mm (0.109 in) and an average depth of 1.36 mm (0.054 in) towards the point's midline. The base is lightly grinded and usually concave, (Note: In about 22% of cases studied by Kehoe and McCorqudale, the base was left flat.) resulting in small, often rounded corner points. The width of the neck connecting the base to the body, varies, and can be narrower, wider, or the same width as the tip.

== Pottery ==
The first studies of Avonlea points noted that little pottery had been recovered in associated Avonlea layers and did not explore possible connections of what material had been recovered. Kehoe used this absence of pottery as evidence for a Dené association, as contemporary populations did not make extensive use of vessels. By the early 1980s, however, archaeologists generally accepted that pottery was indeed part of Avonlea culture.

The most notable ceramic type found in association with the Avonlea projectile points is the Rock Lake Net/Fabric-Impressed type. These wares first appear in Saskatchewan at the Sjovold site and date to 1630±200 BP, making them contemporary with Avonlea, and are very similar to samples recovered in Minnesota. Radiocarbon dates at Rock Lake-associated sites range from 400 to 1100–1200 CE, although most sites date to 700–900 CE.

Other pottery types include the Truman Parallel-Grooved and Ethridge Cord-Roughened, as well as an undefined simple ware type. The Truman Parallel-Grooved type has been found at other non-Avonlea sites, including the Truman Mounds site in South Dakota, although it is heavily associated with the culture. These vessels date between 400–800 CE.

== Human remains ==
As of 2018, only one Avonlea-associated burial in Canada has been recorded. At Bethune, Saskatchewan, the skeleton of an adult male was recovered. The man had sustained a left-side head injury over his eye.

== Diet and bison hunting ==
The Avonlea point is closely associated with bison hunting. All of the Avonlea complex sites included in the first published study are either buffalo jumps or camps associated with buffalo hunting, and the points continue to be heavily associated as such. Prior to the introduction of the bow and arrow, bison hunting was typically carried out with an atlatl.

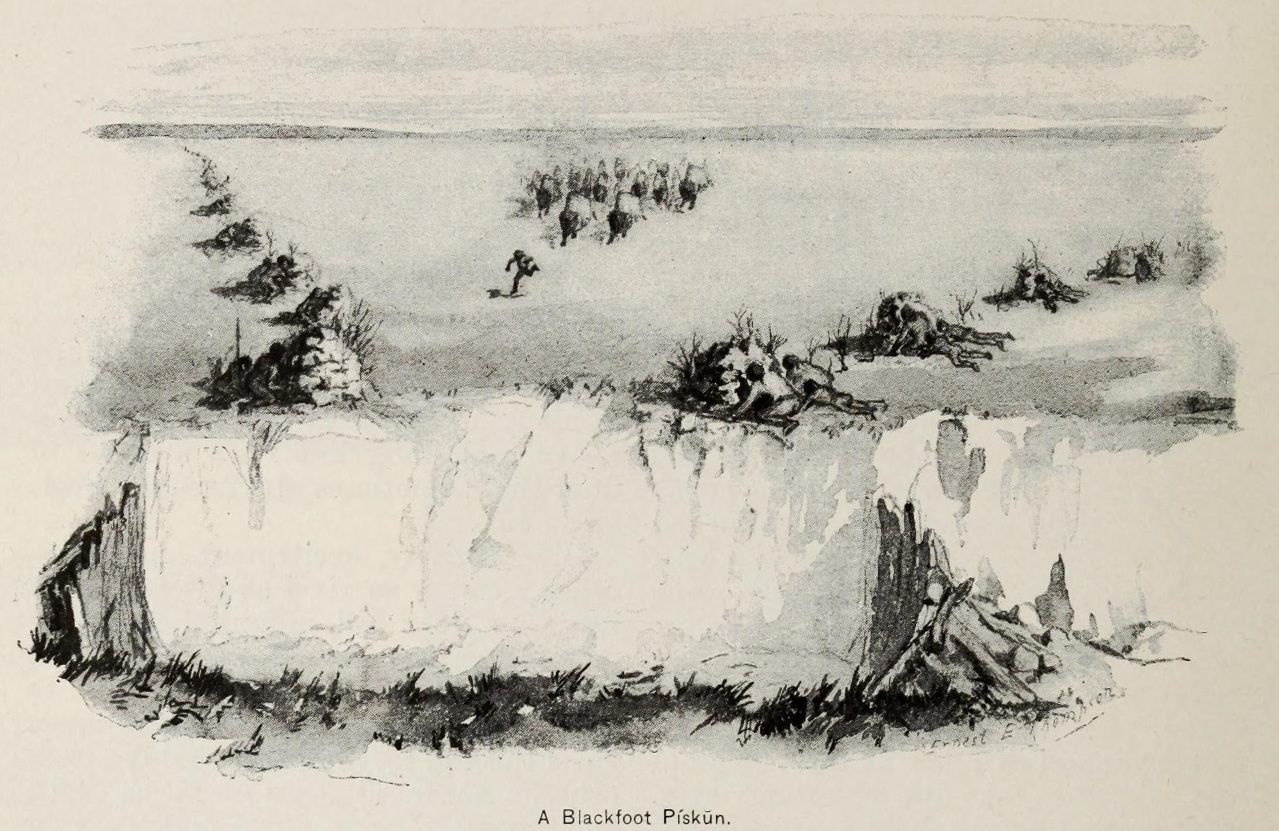
Depiction of a Blackfoot piskun, in which a buffalo herd is guided into a corralled buffalo jump

The contemporary glaciated landscape provided plenty of water sources and grasslands; vast buffalo herds flourished at this time. Several local natural barriers to buffalo movement kept them local; forests on the west, north, and east of the Avonlea distribution prevented easy migration, and the more arid grasslands to the south did not have as many reliable water sources. Additionally, multiple features such as coulees and ridges provided natural features against—or over—which buffalo could be herded, and any survivors confined to corrals. Kehoe and McCorquodale suggest the Avonlea point was favorable for close-range dispatching of these corraled and felled buffalo. By 700 CE, this method of jumping and corraling bison in tandem with bow-and-arrow hunting became the dominant method of hunting bison on the Great Plains.

Early publications describe the appearance of the Avonlea complex as evidence of the first large-scale buffalo hunts, as the Dené were accomplished caribou hunters; as well as the earliest evidence for the bow and arrow on the northern Great Plains. However, later evidence revealed that coordinated bison drives had been practiced at least as early as the preceding Besant and Pelican Lake cultures, albeit not on the scale of the Late Precontact period. Additionally, the bow and arrow has now been dated back to the Pelican Lake culture, predating the newest estimations of Dené arrival by several hundred years. The Avonlea culture did, however, cause the widespread replacement of the atlatl with the bow and arrow.

In 1988, an Avonlea fishing site, the Lebret site, was described in Saskatchewan. Additionally, fish bones were found in the Avonlea assemblages at the Yellow Sky site at Turtle Lake and the Wallington Flats site. These sites are unique in that they depart from the Avonlea's typical association with bison hunting.

== Distribution ==
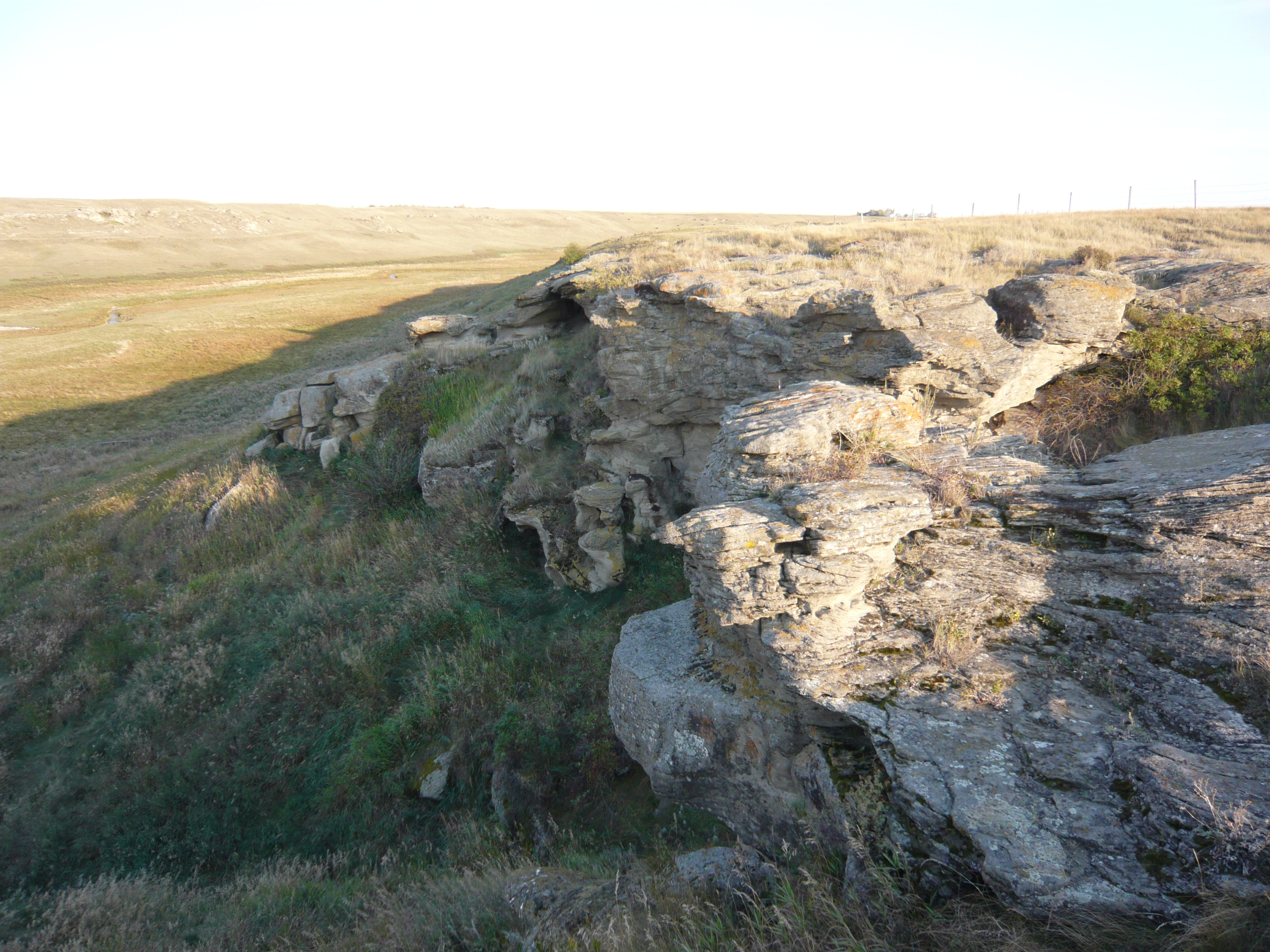
Old Women's Buffalo Jump, where Avonlea points have been found

The Avonlea complex is located in the upper Great Plains, in both the United States and Canada. Its epicenter includes the southern reaches of Saskatchewan and Alberta, northern Montana, and northwestern North Dakota, but it has been found to a lesser extent in southwestern Manitoba, western Minnesota, northern Iowa, South Dakota, northeastern Wyoming, southeastern Montana, and the rest of North Dakota.

=== Associated sites ===
The type site for the culture, the Avonlea site, is a buffalo jump located in the Avonlea Creek valley of southern Saskatchewan.

==== Canada ====
Saskatchewan

- Avonlea site (EaNg-1), the type site
- Bakkan-Wright Bison Drive
- Besant site, also known as the Mortlach site (EcNl-1)
- Broadview site
- Cherry Lake site, near Indian Head
- Davies site, Moose Jaw
- EgNp-15 (Note: This site was inundated by the construction of a dam on the Saskatchewan River.)
- Garratt site (EcNj-7), Moose Jaw
- Goosen Pasture site, near Saskatoon
- Gravel Pit site, near Nipawin
- Gull Lake site, near Gull Lake
- Klein site, near Melfort
- Lebret site (EeMw-26)
- Long Creek site
- Mann site, near Parry
- Mineral Creek site, near Nipawin
- Sjovold site (EiNs-4)
- Tipperary Creek site, near Saskatoon
- Wallington Flat fite, near Nipawin
- Walter Felt site
- Yellow Sky site, Turtle Lake

Alberta

- EcOs-41, near Medicine Hat
- EePk-190
- EePj-19
- H.M.S. Balzac site, near Calgary
- Herb Johnson site (DlPc-1)
- MacLean site, near Fort Macleod
- Manyfingers site
- Morkin site (DlPk-2)
- Old Women's Buffalo Jump
- Riverland site (DlPc-4)
- Ross site (DlPd-3)
- Trout Creek site
- Upper Kill site (DlPd-1)
- Windy Flats (DlPd-17)

Manitoba

- Miniota site

==== United States ====
Montana

- Boarding School Bison Drive
- Corey Ranch site (24TT83)
- Fantasy site (24PH1324)
- Goheen site (24WX30)
- Hagen site
- Henry Smith site (24PH794)
- Lost Terrace site
- Pictograph Cave
- Rinehardt Bison Drive, near Shelby
- TRJ site (24PH1569)

South Dakota

- Ludlow Cave, Harding County
- Mitchell Site

Wyoming

- Mangus site

== See also ==
- Archaeology of Saskatchewan
- Indigenous peoples in Canada
