= History of Saskatchewan =

History of a Canadian province

Map of Canada showing Rupert's Land boundaries by 1870.

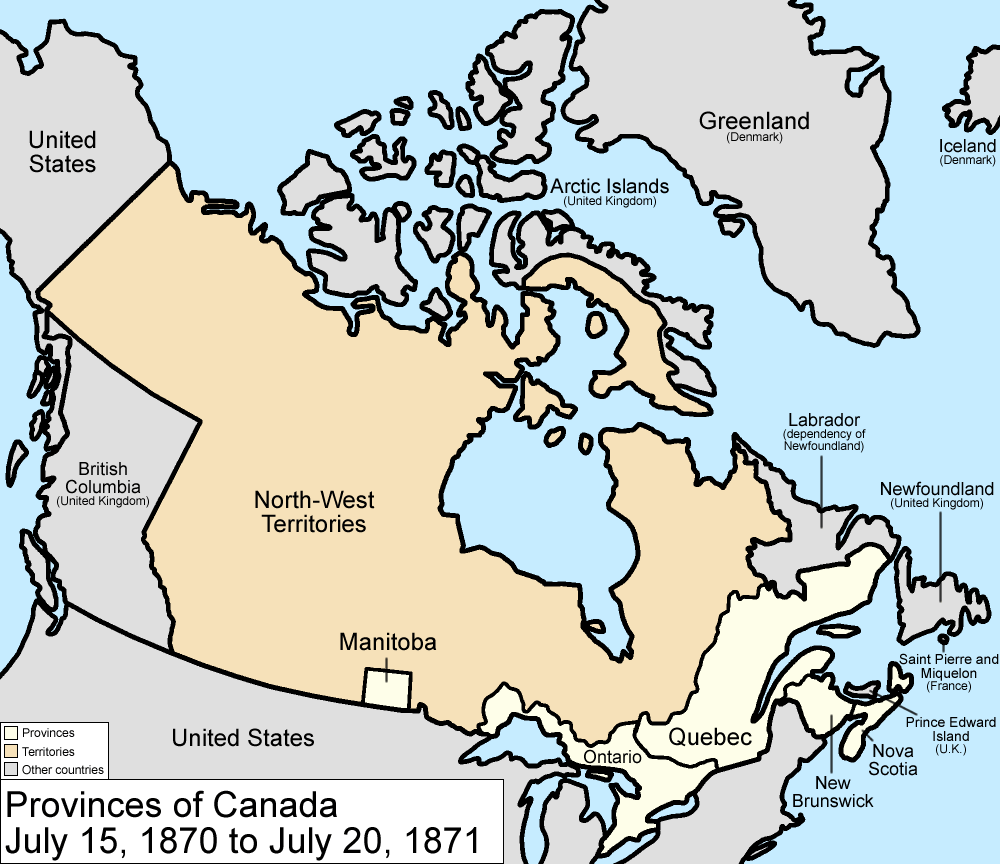
Map of Canada showing boundaries of the North-West Territories which was divided into provisional districts 1870.

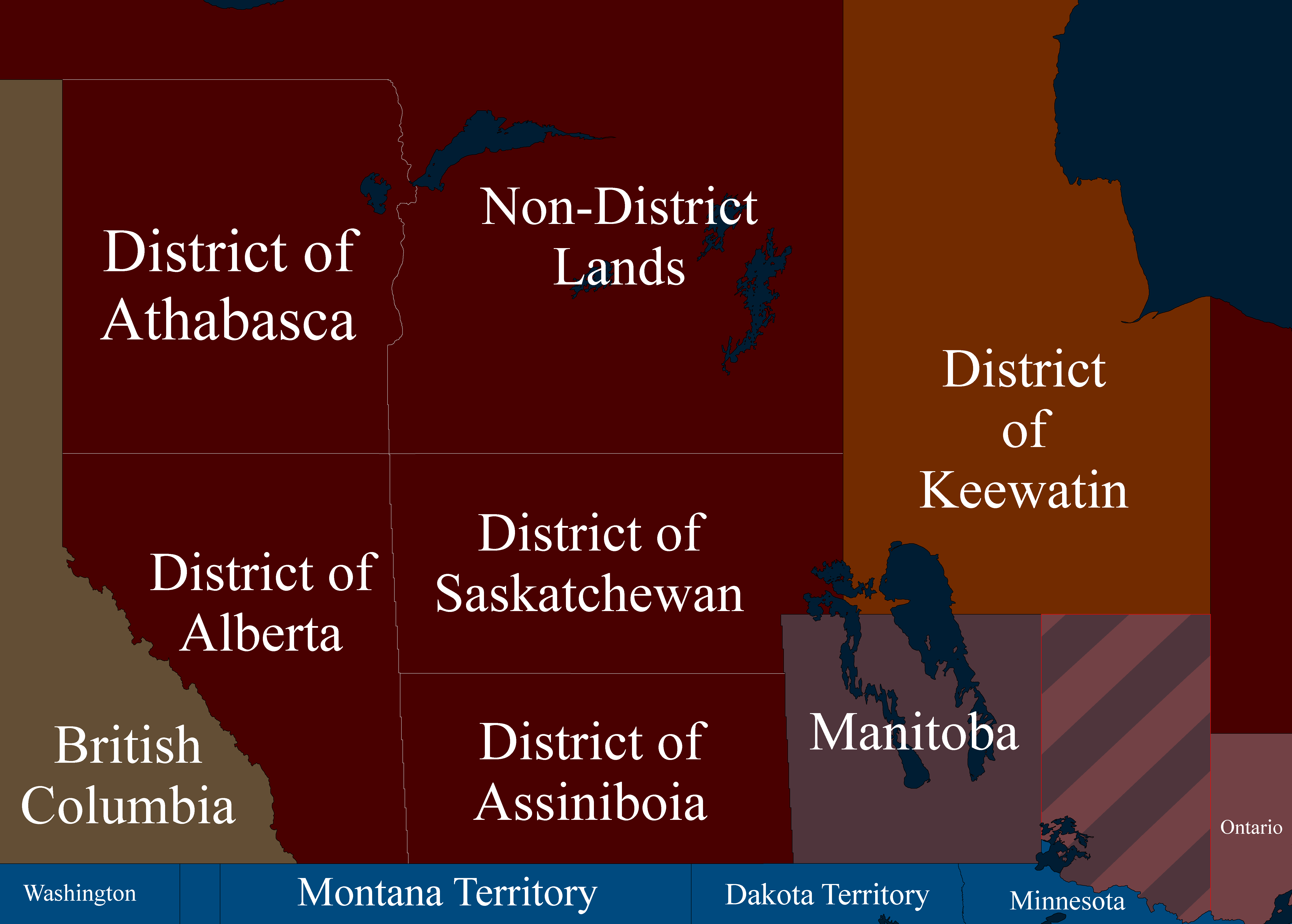
The Provisional Districts of Alberta, Assiniboia, Athabasca, and Saskatchewan were Districts of the North-West Territories created in 1882. They were named provisional districts to distinguish them from the District of Keewatin which had a more autonomous relationship from the NWT administration.

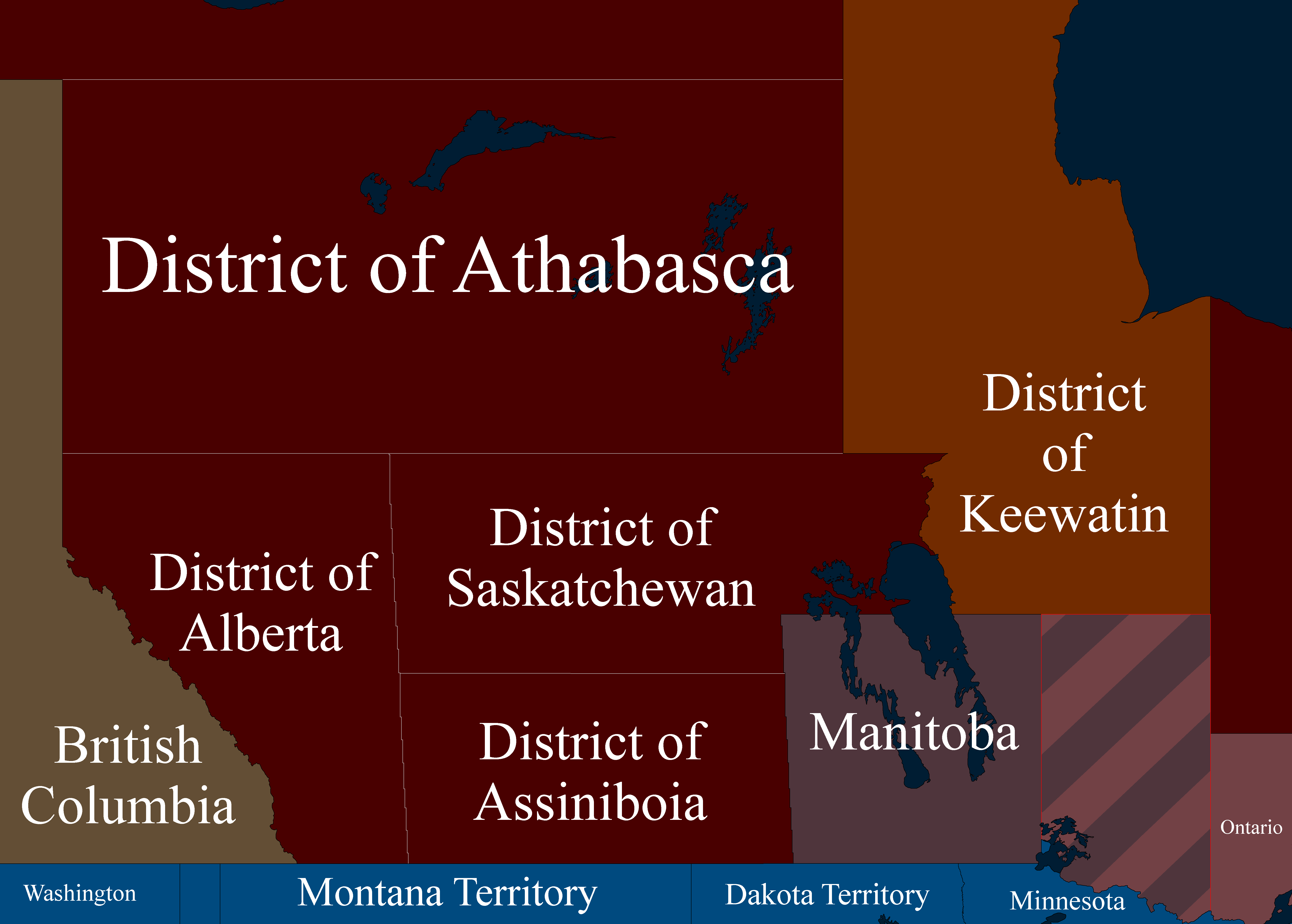
Due to the vastness of the North-West Territories, it was divided into more administrative districts. 1895 saw the formation of the District of Franklin, District of Ungava, and the District of Mackenzie which were all part of the NWT. By this date, the Provisional District of Athabasca had extended as far east as the first meridian.

Map of Canada showing provincial and territorial boundaries set out April 1, 1999

History of Saskatchewan encompasses the study of past human events and activities of the Canadian province of Saskatchewan, the middle of Canada's three prairie provinces. Archaeological studies give some clues as to the history and lifestyles of the Palaeo-Indian, Taltheilei, and Shield Archaic traditions who were the first occupants of the prehistoric era of this geographical area. They evolved into the history of the First Nations people who kept their history alive in oral tradition. The First Nation bands that were a part of this area were the Chipewyan, Cree, Saulteaux, Assiniboine, Atsina, and Sioux.

Henry Kelsey (1667–1724), was the first European (an Englishman) to visit this area, and arrived in 1690. Other European explorers also soon arrived followed by fur traders such as the Governor and Company of Adventurers of England trading into Hudson's Bay (Hudson's Bay Company) and North West Company. Clifford Sifton, Minister of the Interior in charge of immigration, (1896–1905) induced a variety of agriculturally inclined European emigrants to Canada to settle prairie land around the transcontinental railway. The political boundaries of this area have changed several times evolving through Rupert's Land, Provisional Districts of the North-West Territories, and finally a province. Saskatchewan has been a province of Canada since 1905.

== Natural history ==
The history of this plains area actually began 2,000–2,100 million years ago wherein there were two continents separated by an ocean. The "Churchill Continent" which would be Manitoba and Saskatchewan, and the "Superior Continent" which would comprise Manitoba and Ontario. 1,830 – 1,800 million years ago these two land masses collided. The Northern shield area and western Rockies formed higher land from the collision.

The lower lands of today's parkland were covered by a shallow sea even in the Palaeozoic Era. It was not until the Cretaceous Period 144 – 66 million years ago that the inland sea began to drain. Here we begin to find the paleontological artifacts of various dinosaur species. The ice age of the Quaternary Period totally again re-shaped and re-shifted the landscape of Saskatchewan, occurring 2 million years ago.

Following these geological changes to this area, and the formation of the continent of North America as we know it, pre-history to the history of contemporary day can begin.

== Pre-European ==
Archaeologists divide the time frame to study ancient findings into contemporary which would be from the 20th century on, Protohistoric archaeology from 1620 to contemporary, and Prehistoric archaeology is the study before early exploration to the area.

The prehistoric archaeology studies the findings and further classifies them according to traditions followed by the ancient peoples.

Palaeo-Indian Tradition of the Agate Basin finds date to as early as c. 6000 BC, Taltheilei Tradition c. 500 BC and Shield Archaic tradition c. 4000 BC.

The Athapaskans, Dene, or Chipewyan First Nation lived in the shield area, and were caribou hunters. Their early archaeological history is documented around 1615.

Samuel Hearne was one of the first early explorers to make contact with the Dene. Algonkian or Woodland Cree (Kristinaux) lived above the treeline, whereas plains Cree lived in the open parkland area. Prairie buffalo hunters pre-dominated in southern Saskatchewan and were mainly of the first nation Siouan or Assiniboine (Nakota). Atsina or Dakota (Sioux) were living on the outskirts of the area now known as Saskatchewan.

== Early explorers ==
Some early explorers who made inroads to the West are:

- Louis de la Corne, Chevalier de la Corne
- Peter Fidler
- Samuel Hearne
- Anthony Henday
- Henry Kelsey
- Pierre La Vérendrye
- Peter Pond
- John Palliser
- David Thompson
- Philip Turnor

== Fur trade era ==
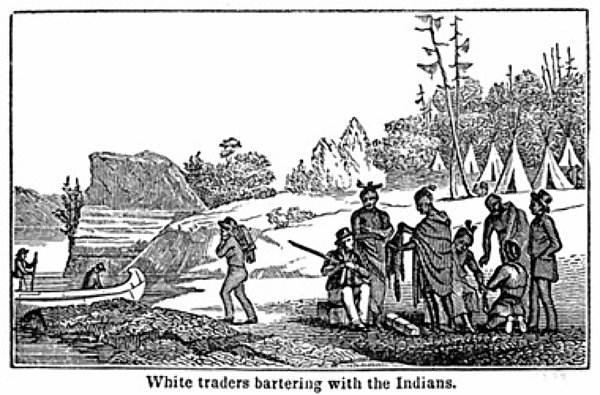
First Nations trading furs for goods from fur traders.

In May 1670, King Charles II of England declared sovereignty over the lands which drained into the Hudson Bay watershed and granted those lands to "the Governor and Company of Adventurers of England trading into Hudson's Bay", which later became the Hudson's Bay Company (HBC). The lands became known as Rupert's Land after the founder of the company. In 1774, Cumberland House, the company's first trading post, was erected.

Travelling inland were the French Canadian voyageurs of the North West Company arriving from Eastern Canada, and from 1740 to about 1820 the Cree peoples were migrating westward as well, coming into contact with the Haaninin and Siksika nations already inhabiting the Saskatchewan river basins as they continued their role as intermediaries in the fur trade. Canadian, European, and American fur traders set up forts and trading posts and continued commerce with the indigenous people, however conflicts between the local Haaninin and the incoming Cree and Assiniboine were exacerbated because of the preference Europeans showed toward trading with the latter indigenous groups over the locals, culminating in attacks in 1794 against both North West Company and Hudson's Bay Company forts.

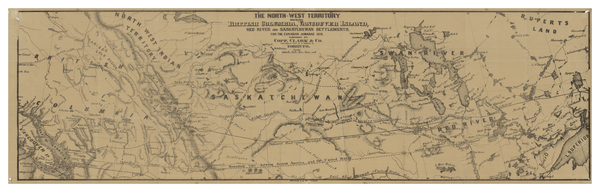
The North-West Territory shewing British Columbia, Vancouver Island, Red River and Saskatchewan Settlements, for the Canadian Almanac 1870.

Local indigenous peoples including the Métis, Haaninin, and Siksika were accustomed to the buffalo hunt, however, some Métis had arrived from the Red River Valley in the 1840s-60 precisely because the hunt was declining in that region, a sign of things to come further west. When Manitoba was established in 1870, many Métis were disappointed with what they felt was a disenfranchisement of their laws and way of life in the new province and migrated into the Saskatchewan River basin, establishing a settlement there and electing Gabriel Dumont as the first president of the council of St Laurent in 1872, charged with governing the annual buffalo hunts and other local laws.

In 1875 local Métis hunters led by an HBC employee broke the hunting laws established by this council to protect the buffalo by hunting ahead of the main caravan. A fine was imposed by the local council on the hunters, who appealed to the local magistrate, Lawrence Clarke. Clarke was, in fact, an officer of the HBC, so in siding with the hunters, he appealed for assistance from the North-West Mounted Police, who sent fifty officers to intimidate and undermine the authority of the local councils in favour of the HBC. Soon after, the seat of the government of the North-West Territories was transferred to Battleford and a North-West Mounted Police fort was established at Duck Lake.

In 1876 a treaty was concluded between the Government of Canada and the local Cree peoples (Treaty 6), and though restrictions on the buffalo hunt and land ownership were tabled by some, they ultimately failed to materialize in the written version of the treaty.

== The North-West Rebellion ==
In 1877, at the first council meeting in the new seat of government in Battleford, many of the laws of the previous council of St Laurent were adopted to protect the buffalo, however these hunting restrictions did not apply to non-Métis indigenous people as per the arrangement of Treaty 6, nor were they an effective means to reduce hunting by and for American markets. According to Gabriel Dumont, the leader of the South Saskatchewan River caravan, bison had become extinct in the region by 1878.

In the late 1870s and early 1880s, several appeals were made by Métis people to be better represented in government. The treaties established with aboriginal groups in the area gave a sense of voice at that time, and territorial government was dominated by the euro-Canadian minority, referring to themselves as 'white' in contrast to the Métis majority in many regions. In April 1883, a local council voted against a proposition to send a delegation to Ottawa to demand their rights, and instead supported an effort to bring Louis Riel back to Canada.

Before the arrival of Louis Riel, a petition was sent from Bishop Gardin to Prime Minister Macdonald that presented all of the grievances and demands of the Métis in the South Saskatchewan river basin including the establishment of the province of Saskatchewan, proper surveying of the traditional river lots of the Métis, and the appointment of Riel as a member of the Territorial Council or Canadian Senate.

Louis Riel arrived in Saskatchewan in July 1884. A feast day was established on September 24 (later moved to July 24) along with the establishment of a patron saint of the Métis and Riel met with many councils and individuals before declaring the establishment of the Provisional Government of Saskatchewan on March 19, 1885. On March 26 Gabriel Dumont, adjunct-general of this provisional government captured Duck Lake with a small army, forcing back the North-West Mounted Police, thus began the North-West Rebellion.

== Political boundaries ==
Rupert's Land became the first western area under English control in 1670 when King Charles II of England granted the lands draining into Hudson's Bay to The Governor and Company of Adventurers Trading into Hudson's Bay (i.e., the Hudson's Bay Company). This area of land became known as "Rupert's Land" after King Charles' cousin, Prince Rupert of the Rhine, who was the first governor of the company.

The North-West Territories was divided into districts in 1870. The Provisional Districts of Alberta, Assiniboia, Athabasca, and Saskatchewan were districts of the Northwest Territories created in 1882. They were named provisional districts to distinguish them from the District of Keewatin which had a more autonomous relationship from the NWT administration. Due to the vastness of the NWT, it was divided into more administrative districts. 1895 saw the formation of the District of Franklin, District of Ungava and the District of Mackenzie which were all part of the NWT. By this date, the Provisional District of Athabasca had extended as far west as the first meridian.

== Immigration and settlement era ==
The settlements patterns were closely tied to the availability of transportation (especially railways) and the fertility of the soil. Ethnic groups tended to settle together, so they could build support networks for religion, language, customs, and finding marriage partners.

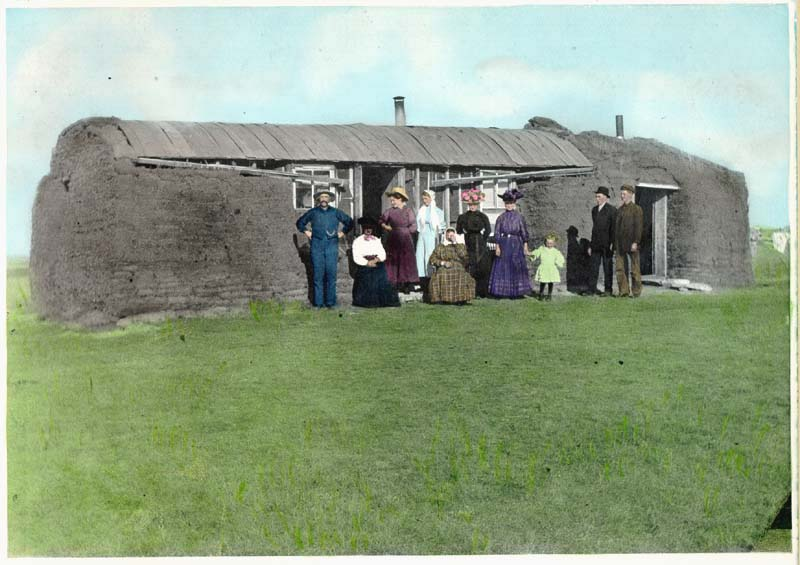
Early sod house

=== Travel routes ===
When the surveyors for the railways came through, they at first proposed a route following the early telegraph line. However, a number of historic factors changed this route. Travel from Winnipeg through to Calgary was easier through the southern prairies rather than going upwards to Battleford and Edmonton. The southern route of the railway, went through the village of Pile O' Bones in 1882. By 1903, the influx of settlers via the railway increased the population to city status, and Pile O' Bones was now known as Regina. In 1905, when Saskatchewan became a province, Regina was named the capital city. Immigration was advertised in a massive campaign put forth by Clifford Sifton, Minister of the Interior in charge of immigration, (1896–1905) who brought into being Canada's homestead act, the Dominion Lands Act in 1872. The railway brought life to settlements, which quickly grew to villages, and towns. Typically many small communities sprung up 10–12 miles apart a distance easily travelled by horse and cart in a day.

=== Immigration policy ===
Settlement policy, set by the federal government, the Canadian Pacific Railway, the Hudson's Bay Company and associated land companies encouraged immigration. The key event was the decision to emulate the American Homestead Law by offering, at no cost, 160 acres of farmland to any man over 18 (or to a woman head of family) who settled there. Dramatic advertising campaigns promoted the benefits of prairie living. Potential immigrants read leaflets information painted Canada as a veritable garden of Eden, and downplayed the need for agricultural expertise. Ads in The Nor'-West Farmer by the Commissioner of Immigration implied that western land held water, wood, gold, silver, iron, copper, and cheap coal for fuel, all of which were readily at hand. Reality was far harsher, especially for the first arrivals who lived in sod houses. However eastern money poured in and by 1913, long term mortgage loans to Saskatchewan farmers had reached $65 million.

=== Ethnicity ===
The dominant groups comprised British settlers from eastern Canada and Britain, who comprised about 50% of the population during the late 19th and early 20th centuries. They played the leading role in establishing the basic institutions of plains society, economy, and government. About a tenth of the people were Irish, with the more numerous Protestants integrating with English and Scottish Protestants, and the less numerous Catholics taking control of the Catholic Church in the province.

==== Blocs and colonies ====
By 1930 there were 19 major ethno-religious bloc settlements in Saskatchewan, chiefly in the north-central region. Seven were French, one German Catholic, two Mennonite, two Hutterite, three Ukrainian-Polish, one Russian Doukhobor, and two were Scandinavian. They differed greatly in size, from the small Hutterite colonies with a population of 75–150 each to St. Peter's Colony, which encompassed fifty-six townships (over two thousand square miles) and included about 9,500 Catholics of German descent.

In the north-west of the provisional district of Saskatchewan, NWT, Interior Minister Clifton Sifton set up bloc colonies for 7400 Doukhobor settlers from Russia in 1899. Peter Verigin arrived in 1902 and became the leader. After their bizarre behaviour alienated public opinion (such as nude protest marches), the government in 1907 took away much of the land they had been awarded. Verigin led most of them to British Columbia.

The French Counts of St Hubert established Rolanderie Ranch and a gentleman lifestyle at Whitewood in 1884. The Counts sought to establish a number of commercial ventures, including a chicory processing factory, a Gruyere cheese factory, a sugar beet venture, and a horse breeding operation. They occasionally socialized with the English colonial outpost of Cannington Manor. In the 1880s Edward Pierce tried to transplant early Victorian living at Cannington Manor in the 1880s, now preserved as Cannington Manor Provincial Park.

The Barr Colonists ventured north in 1903 and settled in Brittania now known as Lloydminster, Saskatchewan.

==== Germans ====
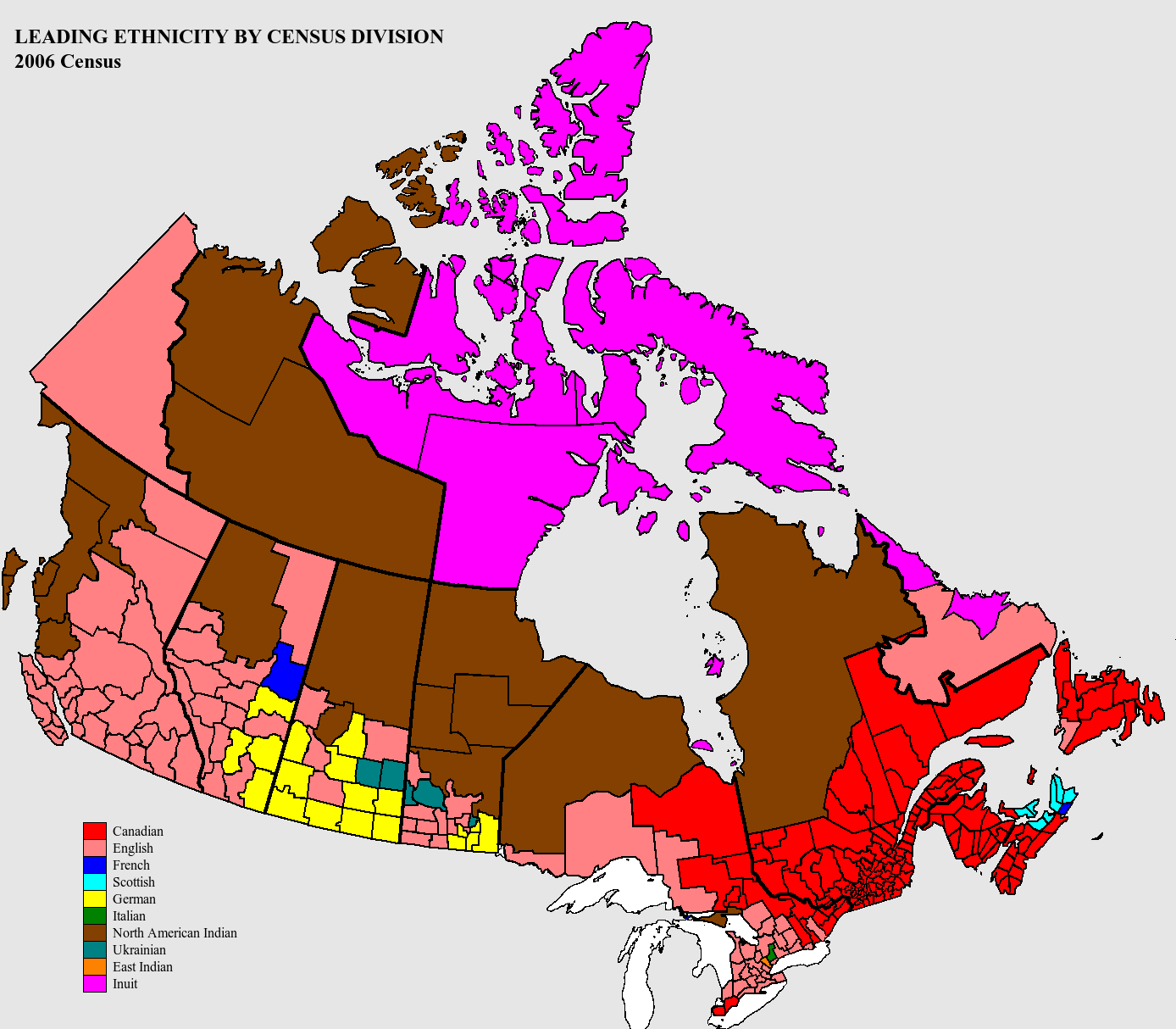
Canadians in 2006 with German ancestry are the majority in parts of the Prairie provinces (areas coloured in yellow); Ukrainian strongholds are in green, British in pink, First Nations in brown. See a more detailed map of Saskatchewan.

The German settlers came primarily from Russia, and after 1914 from German-American settlements in North and South Dakota. They came not as large groups but as part of a chain of family members, where the first immigrants would find suitable locations and send for the others. They formed compact German-speaking communities built around their Catholic or Lutheran churches, and continuing old-world customs. They were farmers who grew wheat. Arrivals from Russia, Bukovina, and Romanian Dobruja established their villages in a 40-mile-wide tract east of Regina.

The Germans operated parochial schools primarily to maintain their religious faith; often they offered only an hour of German language instruction a week, but they always had extensive coverage of religion. Most German Catholic children by 1910 attended schools taught entirely in English. In the 199x–1930 era, German Catholics generally voted for the Liberal ticket (rather than the Provincial Rights and Conservative tickets), seeing Liberals as more willing to protect religious minorities. Occasionally they voted for Conservatives or independent candidates who offered greater support for public funding of parochial schools. Nazi Germany made a systematic effort to proselytize among Saskatchewan's Germans in the 1930s. Fewer that 1% endorsed their message, but some did migrate back to Germany before anti-Nazi sentiment became overwhelming in 1939.

==== Ukrainians ====
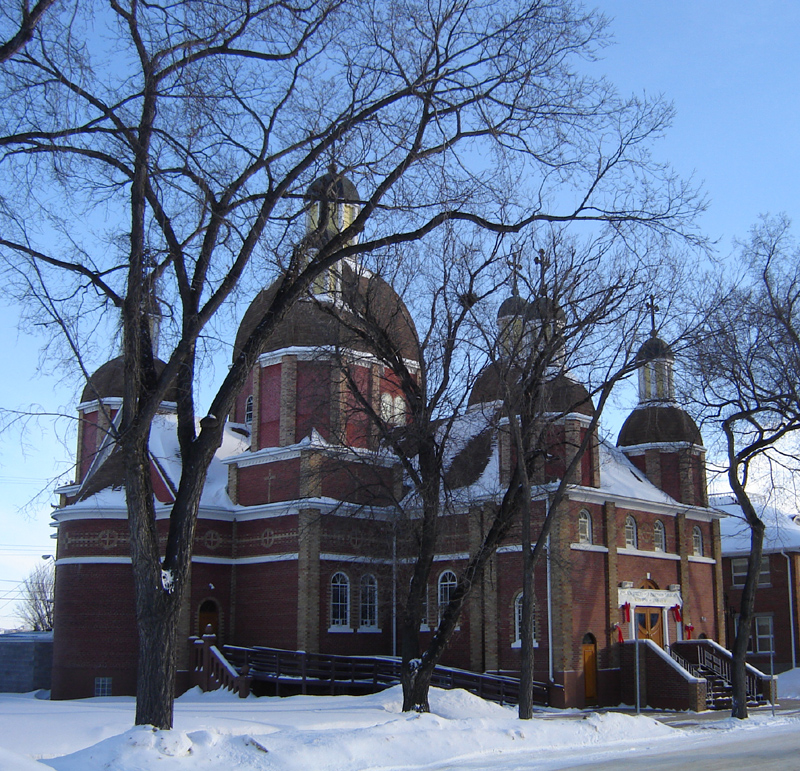
St. George's Ukrainian Catholic Cathedral, Saskatoon

In 1911, 22,300 Ukrainians lived in Saskatchewan, and 28,100 in 1921. Only Manitoba had larger numbers. The 107,000 Ukrainians in 1921, nationwide, grew to 530,000 in 1981, including 101,000 in Saskatchewan.

Ukrainians—often called "Ruthenians" at the time—began arriving in numbers in the 1890s. They came as farmers, and actively built churches. Their requests for Ukrainian language public schools were often rejected by local officials.

Ukrainian men in 1914 were not Canadian citizens but were subjects of Austria-Hungary, an enemy nation. Many were unemployed. The government interned about 5,000 men, mostly those who were caught trying to cross the border into the U.S. (It was illegal for an enemy alien to leave the country). They were assigned work on federal and provincial public work projects as well as for the railways.

Religiously the Ukrainians were split between two Catholic and two Orthodox denominations. One of the latter was the "Ukrainian Orthodox Church of Canada", established in 1918 with the goal of defending the interests of the people as a bulwark against discrimination and oppression of the sort that Ukrainians had just experienced.

Since World War Two, Ukrainians have largely assimilated into Canadian culture.

==== Assimilation and nativism ====
In the 1910–1930 era, the provincial department of education led systematic efforts to place English-speaking teachers in every school to Canadianize the ethnic groups through the use of the English language and the teaching of British values. He envisioned the role of the teacher to be an educator, missionary, and model Canadian citizen.

The Ku Klux Klan moved north into the prairies in 1926, and was especially strong among British residents of Saskatchewan. It built on ethnic prejudices, but had few major successes. Its peak came in 1927–30 when it shaped the vocabulary used to discuss issues of language, sectarianism, immigration, and control of natural resources. It over and over again warned of "Catholic plots," but faded away when the Great Depression hit and the conspiracy-minded turned their attention to eastern cities and bankers.

=== Families ===
Gender roles were sharply defined. Men were primarily responsible for breaking the land; planting and harvesting; building the house; buying, operating and repairing machinery; and handling finances. At first there were many single men on the prairie, or husbands whose wives were still back east, but they had a hard time. They realized the need for a wife. In 1901, there were 19,200 families, but this surged to 150,300 families only 15 years later. Wives played a central role in settlement of the prairie region. Their labour, skills, and ability to adapt to the harsh environment proved decisive in meeting the challenges. They prepared bannock, beans and bacon, mended clothes, raised children, cleaned, tended the garden, helped at harvest time and nursed everyone back to health. While prevailing patriarchal attitudes, legislation, and economic principles obscured women's contributions, the flexibility exhibited by farm women in performing productive and nonproductive labour was critical to the survival of family farms, and thus to the success of the wheat economy.

== Population history ==
When Saskatchewan became a province in 1905, boosters and politicians proclaimed its destiny was to become Canada's most powerful province. Saskatchewan embarked on an ambitious province-building program based on its Anglo-Canadian culture and wheat production for the export market. Population quintupled from 91,000 in 1901 to 492,000 to 1911, thanks to heavy immigration of farmers from the U.S., Germany and Scandinavia. Efforts were made to assimilate the newcomers to British Canadian culture and values.

The population reached 758,000 in 1921 and peaked at 922,000 in 1931. It lost population in the Great Depression and war years, dropping to 830,000 in 1951, then slowly climbed back up, holding steady at about one million since 1986.

The ethnic history of the province was reflected in the ancestry data in 2006. The largest ethnic groups were German (30.0%), followed by English (26.5%), Scottish (19.2%), Irish (15.3%), Ukrainian (13.6%), French (12.4%), First Nations (12.1%), Norwegians (7.2%), Polish (6.0%), Métis (4.4%), Dutch (3.7%), Russian (3.7%) and Swedish (3.5%). Some 18.1% of all respondents also identified their ethnicity as "Canadian".

Saskatchewan's population since 1901

The largest denominations in 2001 were the Roman Catholic Church with 286,815 (30%); the United Church of Canada with 187,450 (20%); and the Lutherans with 78,520 (8%). 148,535 (15.4%) responded "no religion".

== 1905–1930 ==
=== Government structure ===
The provisional districts of Assiniboia, Saskatchewan and Athabaska of the North-West Territories amalgamated into the province of Saskatchewan in 1905. The boundaries consist of: on the west is the 4th Meridian [of the Dominion Land Survey], south 49th parallel US-Canada boundary line, to the north the North-West Territories-Saskatchewan boundary line, and just about on the 2nd Meridian on the eastern boundary with the province of Manitoba.

The early government formed local improvement districts (later re-organized into rural municipalities) initially to protect against prairie fires, establish roads and bridges. As homesteads were established, and agricultural methods perfected the community, slowly evolved. With supplemental monetary resources rural municipalities could now develop and establish schools for education, churches, cemeteries, and health care for their residents.

=== Political history 1905–1919 ===
The long-term prosperity of the province depended on the world price of wheat, which headed steadily upward from the 1880s to 1920, then plunged down. Wheat output was increased by new strains, such as the "Marquis" strain which matured 8 days sooner and yielded 7 more bushels per acre than the previous standard, "Red Fife". The national output of wheat soared from 8 million bushels in 1896, to 26 million in 1901, reaching 151 million by 1921.

In the 1905 provincial elections, Liberals won 16 of 25 seats in Saskatchewan. The Saskatchewan government bought out Bell Telephone Company in 1909, with the government owning the long-distance lines and left local service to small companies organized at the municipal level. Premier Thomas Walter Scott preferred government assistance to outright ownership because he thought enterprises worked better if citizens had a stake in running them; he set up the Saskatchewan Cooperative Elevator Company in 1911. Despite pressure from farm groups for direct government involvement in the grain handling business, the Scott government opted to loan money to a farmer-owned elevator company. Saskatchewan in 1909 provided bond guarantees to railway companies for the construction of branch lines, alleviating the concerns of farmers who had trouble getting their wheat to market by wagon.

Urban reform movements in Regina in the years just prior to the start of the First World War in 1914 depended on support from business and professional groups. City planning, reform of local government, and municipal ownership of utilities were more widely supported by these two groups, often through such organizations as the Board of Trade. Protestant church-related and other altruistic organizations generally supported social welfare and housing reforms, but they were usually less successful in getting their reforms enacted. In the 1910s Saskatchewan, under its chief officer of health, Maurice Macdonald Seymour (1857–1929), became the nation's leader in public health programs.

The province responded to the First World War in 1914 with patriotic enthusiasm and enjoyed the resultant economic boom. The price of wheat tripled and acreage seeded doubled. The wartime spirit of sacrifice intensified social reform movements that had predated the war and now came to fruition. Saskatchewan gave women the right to vote in 1916. Also in 1916 it passed a referendum to prohibit the sale of alcohol, as the women had demanded.

Patriotism also created a demand for a common language—English—for everyone in the province. The war brought to the forefront a fear of ethnicities, and a survival instinct developed the need for a Canadian identity.

=== 1919–1939 ===
The economic crash after the war created an angry agrarian protest movement. Prairie farmers had long considered themselves the victims of powerful corporations—grain companies, banks, and railways—all based in Toronto and Montreal. Attacks on industrialists and financiers blamed high tariffs designed to protect manufacturers at the expense of farmers. During the war farmers felt doubly betrayed. The federal government first promised to exempt their sons from compulsory military service, then cancelled the exemption. It imposed a ceiling on wheat prices when they were high, but removed the floor when they were low. The farmers' pent-up frustration led to the formation of the Progressive Party in several provinces; it sent 64 to Ottawa in the 1921 general election.

Eager to control the price of wheat, 46,000 farmers joined in 1923–24 to set up the "Saskatchewan Co-operative Wheat Producers"—the Saskatchewan Wheat Pool—that bought nearly everyone's wheat and held it in elevators for the best price. The pool collapsed financially in 1931 and the federal government had to cover the losses; the co-op continued as a network of elevators owned by the farmers. It advanced the reform agenda for agricultural development, with full-time district representatives, or fieldmen, who promoted education, demonstrations of farm equipment, community picnics and rallies, and cooperative insurance, among other programs.

The Roaring Twenties saw ethnic tensions and unprecedented prosperity. Bootlegging activities, gangsters such as Al Capone, and the underground trade of whisky smuggling used the caves around Cypress Hills, and the Soo Line Railroad which ended in Moose Jaw, the "Sin City of the north", or "Little Chicago". The Bronfman family became rich during Prohibition by shipping liquor into the United States, where it was illegal. Under the leadership of brothers Sam and Harry, the family based most of its operations out of Yorkton and Regina, while maintaining a warehouse in Moose Jaw.

The Saskatchewan Grain Growers' Association worked with the provincial Liberals and kept them in office until 1929, when a Conservative-led coalition was elected for a term. As wheat prices recovered the late 1920s were golden years. By 1927 Saskatchewan ranked first among the provinces in the production of wheat, oats, rye, and flax, and in sundry other areas. Most important, it ranked first in per capita wealth. With a population of 922,000 in 1931 ranked third in size, behind only Ontario and Quebec.

The Great Depression hit the prairies hard, especially when combined with the drought of the Dirty Thirties. The world market for wheat collapsed and per capita money income fell 75%. Thousands emigrated away from the family homestead as it could no longer support the family nor the community. Relief expenditures in the province in 1937 exceeded $40 million, dwarfing the entire 1939 provincial budget of $23 million. The hard-pressed government imposed a new 2% sales tax to cover the promissory notes that had been given to teachers in lieu of salaries.

In 1930, Saskatoon initiated a series of "work for wages" schemes designed to provide the unemployed with unskilled manual jobs. Financed from municipal, provincial, and federal sources, but operated by the city, the projects kept unemployment to manageable levels at first. Before 1932, most experts saw the depression as a temporary anomaly, a short-term emergency requiring no more than short-term emergency measures. By 1932 the depression was getting much worse with no end in sight. By spring 1932, the federal and provincial governments, short of revenue, were forced to abandon expensive public works in favour of the cheaper, more efficient direct relief of giving out cash and foot baskets. Radical activism in the cities led to the Estevan Riot and the Regina Riot.

Finally prosperity returned after 1939, as farm prices rose and Saskatchewan plunged into the war effort.

=== Social structure, 1940s–1950s ===
As late as 1940, the province was heavily rural, dotted with many small service villages and towns. Two thirds of the people lived on farms. A tenth lived in towns or villages of more than 1,000 population. Another 15% lived in four small cities: Regina, the capital, with a population of 58,000; Moose Jaw, forty miles west of Regina, with 20,000; Saskatoon, the home of the university, with 43,000; and Prince Albert in the north, with 13,000. The cities were merely larger versions of the country towns; they were primarily trading centres serving rural areas. Railroads, wholesale trade and retail trade employed most of the urban workers.

Little economic decision-making power was concentrated in the cities. The small urban upper-middle class was composed of professionals and branch managers of national banks and corporations or heads of small local manufacturing or trading organizations. The banks were mostly branch offices with headquarters far to the east; the leading stores were branches of national chains, especially Eaton's, Simpson's, the Hudson's Bay Company. To the farmer and urbanite alike, the names symbolize the world of eastern business that controls their fate, and became the target of political fears.

A pervasive social and economic equality characterized the rural areas. Sharp variations existed between the rich south and the poor north. Farmers in districts of good soil were generally wealthier; large farms of 640 acres (2.6 km^{2}) to 1,200 acres (4.9 km^{2}) dominated the rich Regina plains and in the Rosetown district west of Saskatoon; small farms of 160 acres (0.65 km^{2}) to 320 acres (1.3 km^{2}) typified the poor-soil regions of the north with small outputs even in years with good weather. Within the province the average assessment per acre of land varied from an index of 9 for the poorest rural municipality to 76 for the wealthiest. Within any one rural community, however, variations in the value of land are small, for the great majority of farms have the same conditions of soil and rainfall. Differences in income did exist within individual rural communities, but they were not large enough to result in the emergence of distinct social classes. There were few hired hands, and tenant farmers were mostly men under age 40 who expected to eventually buy or inherit land.

Mechanization after 1945 thus changed the face of Saskatchewan. Combines and mechanized farming were now available, farms became larger, and more folk moved into urban centres. The one-room school house closed down to make way for the more industrial or consolidated school in town which provided more resources for more technological development. Growth and improvements in technology paved the way for the contemporary society of Saskatchewan.

== Tommy Douglas and CCF ==
A new political movement emerged, the Cooperative Commonwealth Federation (CCF); its 1933 manifesto promised to eradicate capitalism and put in place a "full program of socialized planning which will lead to the establishment in Canada of the Co-operative Commonwealth." Tommy Douglas (1904–86), a Baptist minister from working class origins, led the CCF to power in 1944 and kept it in power to 1961. Douglas headed the first socialist government elected in Canada, and is recognized as the father of socialized medicine and the leader who put democratic socialism in the mainstream of Canadian politics.

The Saskatchewan CCF won in June 1944 with a "Pocket Platform" calling for home ownership and debt reduction; increased old age pensions, mothers' allowances, and disability care; public medical, dental, and hospital services; equal education; free speech, and religion; collective bargaining; and the encouragement of economic co-operatives. The CCF, while rhetorically socialist, did not nationalize banking or industry; it sought a mixed economy, including public, private, and cooperative sectors, with a strong role for private ownership in innovation and competition, however with new controls. For example, In its first term the CCF passed a farm security act preventing banks and mortgage companies from foreclosing on family farms.

The CCF government also introduced the most pro-labour trade union act in North America. Saskatchewan became the first province to allow civil servants to organize unions (1944), the first to enshrine a bill of rights prohibiting discrimination on the basis of race, colour, or creed (1947), the first to implement compulsory government automobile insurance (1946), and the first to institute a hospital insurance plan (1947).

The CCF was committed to efficiency-oriented planning. Douglas set up an Economic Advisory and Planning Board (EAPB), a cabinet committee with a supporting secretariat, charged with planning economic development strategies for the province and evaluating overall policies and programs. The EAPB evolved into two new agencies: the Budget Bureau and the Government Finance Office. The former was the secretariat for the Treasury Board, the committee of cabinet in charge of allocating budgetary expenditures. In addition, the Budget Bureau had an Organization and Methods unit, which surveyed the operations of various government departments and made recommendations on how they could be managed more effectively. Budgeting became more than the mechanical exercise of allocating money; it became the meeting point of the decision-making process, where all the Douglas government's diverse priorities were integrated.

The CCF set up eleven small Crown corporations including power and telephone utilities, bus and airline companies, and ventures into sodium sulfate mining, a woolen mill, and a shoe factory. By 1949, most of the non-utility corporations had been unable to turn a profit and ceased operations.

Prosperity returned after 1945, and the population increased gradually. More dramatic was the movement from farms to towns and cities as farming became more mechanized and capital intensive. Increased production of oil, gas, and uranium, and the beginnings of a potash industry helped diversify the economy beyond just wheat.

=== Native policies ===
Douglas brought First Nations delegates together in 1946 to form a single organization to represent Indian interests. Three existing organizations merged into the Union of Saskatchewan Indians, which later became the Federation of Saskatchewan Indian Nations (FSIN). Douglas's EAPB prepared an in-depth analysis of the demographic, social, and economic challenges facing the First Nation population. In the 21st century the FSIN is a strong policy-making and program-delivery organization, arguably one of the most effective of its kind in Canada.

CCF initiatives included encouraging northern aboriginals to trade their semi-nomadic lifestyles for lives in urban settings. The establishment of Kinoosao on Reindeer Lake provides an example of how CCF planners established new villages; community development processes excluded local people. Yet, in spite of considerable resistance, various incentives and coercive measures resulted in the movement of nearly all northerners to permanent settlements.

=== Socialized medicine ===
In 1959, Douglas promised universal medical care insurance, based on pre-payment, quality service and government administration, and through a scheme acceptable to both doctors and patients. The election of 1960 was fought on this issue; the doctors campaigning against it, but the CCF won.

The CCF comprised two contradictory traditions – a group aligned with a rational, bureaucratic, statist approach to government and a faction dedicated to the populist ideals of democratic participation. The struggle between these two sometimes overlapping factions ended, at least temporarily, with the resignation of Douglas and the succession of Woodrow S. Lloyd (1913–72) as premier in November 1961. Lloyd's statist approach to government dominated the CCF and its policies during the critical period of the introduction of a province-wide system of state-sponsored medical insurance. No referendum or local control through community clinics was permitted in the implementation of the medical insurance plan (in part due to doctors' opposition to community clinics). The plan was presented to the public not for its approval but for its acceptance. The CCF did consider community involvement necessary. After twenty years in office, a centrist-bureaucratic ideology dominated the party and the anti-statist decentralist in the Saskatchewan CCF was in retreat.

The Saskatchewan Medical Care Insurance Bill became law in November 1961, and the medical society announced doctors would refuse to participate, complaining that it would bring regimentation and would interfere with the doctor-patient relationship. The doctors even went on strike for a few weeks in July 1962, but returned when new legislation allowed them to practise outside the system. Eventually the Saskatchewan plan was so popular that in 1968 the federal government extended it nationwide.

Douglas became leader of the federal New Democratic Party (formed by a merger of the CCF and organized labour). The party was unsuccessful in its first election, the federal election of 1962, due to the backlash against the CCF's medical care program and to Canadians' general historic reluctance to vote for progressive change.

In the 1964 Saskatchewan provincial election, the Liberal party, led by Ross Thatcher (1917–71), swept to victory, ending 20 years of CCF government. The Liberals had launched a strong party membership drive and engaged in vigorous campaigning on a platform demanding more private enterprise and industrial development; it promised substantial tax cuts. The CCF's internal factionalism, together with lingering reaction to the medical care crisis of 1962 and the separate school issue, contributed to the CCF defeat.

The impact of the Douglas government on the rest of the country was profound, both in public policy and the bureaucratic machinery devised to implement it. After the defeat in 1964, the former administration's influence continued to ripple out from Regina, as senior civil servants left the province and became influential elsewhere.

== Recent history ==
=== NDP government 1971–1982 ===
Thatcher and his Liberals were re-elected in 1967, but were defeated in a landslide by Allan E. Blakeney (1925–2011) and the NDP in 1971. The NDP was re-elected in 1975, as the long-dormant Progressive Conservative party made a comeback.

Blakeney's government practised state-led economic intervention in the economy. The farmers were a high priority, as globalization began transforming agriculture, weakening the traditional family farm through consolidation, mechanization, and corporatization. The NDP promised a "revitalized rural Saskatchewan," and Blakeney's introduced programs to stabilize crop prices, retain transportation links, and modernize rural life. Looking back he lamented his lack of success: "We were, it seems, King Canute trying to hold back the tide."

The NDP decided to nationalize the potash industry in 1976–78 by buying out 45% of the mining interests. The government created a Crown corporation in the potash industry in an attempt to further diversify the province's agrarian economy and threatened expropriation of private potash mines within the province. Blakeney pointed out that the sums paid for these mines were slightly in excess of their appraised "book" value. However, the mere threat of expropriation created a political firestorm that involved even the U.S. government. By 1979 the Crown Investments Corporation, the holding company for the crowns, had assets of $3.5 billion and revenues of over $1 billion.

Blakeney also created a state-owned oil and gas corporation (SaskOil) to handle oil exploration and production. The private oil industry had essentially abandoned Saskatchewan following the NDP's imposition of high royalty rate policy of the early 1970s. Prime Minister Pierre Trudeau's policies (to centralize control of natural resources in Ottawa) outraged Blakeney, and he moved closer to Alberta's position of open hostility. Blakeney joined Alberta Progressive Conservative Premier Peter Lougheed in a fight for provincial rights over minerals, oil and gas.

Nationalization was the central issue in the 1978 elections; the NDP held its own but the Liberals were wiped out and the Progressive Conservative party grew. Prosperity was at hand, with good prices for wheat and expansion of oil and uranium. The NDP spent resource revenues to build on the social welfare legacy of the CCF. It introduced a guaranteed income supplement for senior citizens, a family income plan for the working poor, a children's dental service, and a prescription drug plan.

=== Since 1982 ===
Voters went to the polls in 1982 as the economy started slipping, with falling prices for wheat, oil, potash, and uranium. The NDP was routed after a dozen years in power, dropping from 45 seats to 9 while the Progressive Conservative Party took all the other 55 seats. The new premier was 37-year-old economist Grant Devine (1944– ), who won with a simple populist message: the people should share in the wealth of the province rather than watch it contribute to the expansion of the 24 Crown corporations. The new government ended the 20% tax on gasoline and lower interest rates on mortgages. It was re-elected in 1986 and began selling off crown corporations. The government said the companies would operate more profitably as private businesses. The opposition NDP warned that the sales would result in loss of control over the province's key economic sectors.

After taking over balanced books in 1982, the Progressive Conservatives spent liberally on a number of voter-friendly initiatives, including tax rebates and mortgage subsidies, as well as investing millions in several money-losing megaprojects. The provincial deficit peaked at $1.2 billion in 1986–87, and the accumulated debt rose from $3.5 billion to $15 billion. The Progressive Conservatives, based in rural areas and small towns, lost many rural voters after pushing through the unpopular U.S.-Canada Free Trade Agreement in 1989. As a result, the NDP was returned to power in 1991.

Scandals involving top officials ruined the Progressive Conservative party, which suspended operations in 1997; conservative voters moved to the new Saskatchewan party at the provincial level, and to the Reform Party of Canada at the national level. The NDP won re-election in 1995 and 1999, and (in coalition with the Liberals) again in 2003. Lorne Calvert (1952– ), an ordained minister, served as NDP premier 2001–2007.

Brad Wall (1965– ) became premier as his centre-right Saskatchewan Party took over from the NDP after a landslide victory in the November 2007 election. The landslide grew after 4 years of solid economic management, nearly wiping out the NDP (losing 11 of 20 seats) in the 2011 election in which NDP party leader Dwain Lingenfelter even failed to retain his own seat (what was once considered a "safe seat" for the NDP, Regina-Elphinstone). Lingenfelter resigned immediately, and the party elected Cam Broten as leader in 2013. He was first elected as an MLA in 2007 and re-elected in 2011. He was elected as Leader of Saskatchewan's New Democrats on March 9, 2013

== Social and economic trends ==
In 2005 two-thirds of the province's population lived in urban areas, there was a diverse economic base, and citizens enjoyed a rich cultural life. The economic future based on high-priced oil and wheat looks bright. Saskatchewan is the ninth biggest supplier of oil to the U.S., shipping them more than Kuwait. The province has 1.2 billion barrels of recoverable conventional oil and an estimated 1.5 billion barrels of potential oil sands reserves (which create troublesome high carbon emissions when processed).

The rural towns have evolved from a very large number of widely dispersed grain delivery points in 1900, through a period of expansion over the first thirty years of the 20th century, to a pattern of relatively concentrated population and businesses in an urban-based economy by 2000. Mechanization, especially the rapid replacement of horses by tractors after 1945, meant one family could operate a much larger farm, so some farmers bought out their neighbors, who then moved to town along with the surplus children. The rural economy diversified far beyond its exclusively agricultural base, with service employment in education and medicine important, as well as small-scale factories. Better highways, along with cell phones and internet coverage encouraged a concentration in fewer, larger centres, which drew customers and clients from a wide radius. Most rural communities declined continuously over the second half of the 20th century, but some grew in population, expanded their economic base, and experienced an increase in their market areas for a limited range of goods and services. These communities also became centres of employment for their own and surrounding (farm and nonfarm) population.

The Wheat Pool continues in operation as Viterra, having taken over Agricore United (based in Manitoba) in 2007. With soaring wheat prices, Viterra's revenues in the first quarter (three months) of 2008 reached $1.3 billion, triple the total the year before.

== Military history ==
Military history of Saskatchewan includes the early conflicts between conflicting First Nations. Prior to European settlement many battles were fought between the Blackfoot, Atsina, Cree, Assiniboine, Saulteaux, Sioux, and Dene. Many place names hearken back to these early conflicts such as the Battle River: so named due to Cree-Blackfoot fighting in the area. The Blackfoot Confederacy, and Atsina or Gros Ventre were pushed out of Saskatchewan following decades of warfare with the Cree, Saulteaux, and Assiniboine. In the boreal forest conflicts raged between the Woods Cree and Dene or Chipewyan up until the late 19th century.

The creation of the Métis added a new dimension to conflicts in what is now Saskatchewan. In addition to violence related to the fur trade between the North West Company and Hudson's Bay Company (which ended with the merger of the two in 1821), the Métis took part in battles with the Sioux and Gros Ventre across the plains. The last battles fought in Saskatchewan, and the last battles fought in what is now Canada occurred in 1885 during the North-West Rebellion. Although small by global standards this short war had a profound effect on Canadian French-English relations, and was a defining moment in the history of the West and the Métis.

Since Saskatchewan became a province in 1905, its people have contributed heavily to wars fought by the Canadian state. Saskatchewan Regiments were raised for the second Boer War, First World War, Second World War, and Korean War. In addition many Saskatchewan citizens have served in United Nations peacekeeping operations, and in the Afghan War.

Some current Saskatchewan regiments in the Primary Reserve of the Canadian Forces include the North Saskatchewan, and the Royal Regina Rifles.

== Inland waterways ==
Travel by boat and canoe along the waterways of what is now Saskatchewan was historically an important mode of transport. During the early fur trading era from the 17th century through to the 19th century, travel to the inland of North America could be facilitated by waterways as there were no roads nor railways at this time. The First Nations and French fur traders from the East relied on birch bark canoes to traverse the main rivers, and the English fur trader from the Hudson's Bay Company travelled by York boat.

During the late 19th century steamboats were used to navigate immigrants and goods along the Saskatchewan River. This only continued until 1896 when the last steamboat ceased operations. The ice flows of the winter months and the shallow sand bars made this form of navigation impractical. The most notable highlight of the steamboat era was the impact steamboats made upon the North-West Rebellion.

Since this time the main use of travel by boat are the 13 seasonal ferries which are still operational and started use in Saskatchewan in the late 19th century. Barges are used to transport freight on the larger northern lakes, Wollaston and Athabasca for the northern mining industry.

== Archontology of Saskatchewan ==
Archontology is the study of historical Saskatchewan offices and important positions in various organizations and societies. This list cannot be comprehensive but rather an introduction to those who have contributed to the shaping of Saskatchewan. There are a few who are highlighted through the events of history, who have helped to mould and build Saskatchewan as it is today.

see also Category:People from Saskatchewan

Louis Riel – (October 22, 1844 – November 16, 1885) was a Canadian politician, a founder of the province of Manitoba, and leader of the Métis people of the Canadian prairies.

Honourable Sir Frederick William Alpin Gordon Haultain K.B., November 25, 1857 – January 30, 1942. Sir Frederick W. A. G. Haultain, Chief Justice of Saskatchewan, and Commissioner of Education, who developed the early school system on the rugged frontier.

The Right Reverend George Lloud MA DD, Bishop of the Diocese of Saskatchewan (January 6, 1861, leader of the British Barr Colony, and founder of Emmanuel College, Saskatoon.

Edgar Dewdney moved the NWT capital from Battleford to Regina.

Reverend James Nisbet, (September 8, 1823 – September 30, 1874) settled in the Prince Albert area and was founder of First Presbyterian Church (1872) where English and Cree Sunday School services were provided.

William Richard Motherwell who was Saskatchewan's first minister of agriculture as well as federal minister of agriculture for the Mackenzie King administration.

Thomas Clement Douglas, PC, CC, SOM, MA, LL.D (hc) (October 20, 1904 – February 24, 1986) was a leader of the Saskatchewan Co-operative Commonwealth Federation (CCF) from 1942 and the seventh Premier of Saskatchewan from 1944 to 1961, who led the first socialist government in North America and introduced universal public medicare to Canada.

John George Diefenbaker, CH, PC, QC, BA, MA, LL.B, LL.D, DCL, FRSC, FRSA, D.Litt, DSL, (18 September 1895 – 16 August 1979) was the 13th Prime Minister of Canada (1957–1963).

== Art history ==
Art history of Saskatchewan is complex and diverse as it follows the changes and social context of art in this prairie province. Petroglyphs are the earliest studied artforms which are located in archaeological sites of Saskatchewan. As early as the 17th century, explorers depicted the early North West in both written, painted and drawn artforms. Frederick Verner, W.G.R. Hind, Peter Rindisbacher, Edward Roper and Paul Kane are some of the earliest artists. Followed by William Kurelek, C. W. Jefferys, Robert Hurley and Dorothy Knowles. Margaret Laurence, W. O. Mitchell, Nellie McClung captured the prairie spirit in words.

In the 1920s, the Group of Seven formed a group of Canadian landscape painters, made up of Franklin Carmichael, Lawren Harris, A. Y. Jackson, Frank Johnston, Arthur Lismer, J. E. H. MacDonald, Frederick Varley, A. J. Casson, Edwin Holgate, LeMoine Fitzgerald and Tom Thomson. Augustus Kenderdine, landscape painter started art instruction at Murray Point on Emma Lake. Imagery changed of the grasslands shown in the early drawings where the wild west was a romantic adventure of first nation and Buffalo. The prairie scenery then highlighted building a Nation, a prairie utopia, through to the realism of the settlement experience.

Paul Kane, (September 3, 1810 – February 20, 1871) was an Irish-Canadian painter, famous for his paintings of First Nations peoples in the Canadian West and other Native Americans in the Oregon Country.

Henry Youle Hind (1 June 1823 – 8 August 1908), Canadian geologist and explorer detailed his travels in both images and these writings Narrative of the Canadian Red River Exploring Expedition of 1857 and Reports of Progress on the Assiniboine and Saskatchewan Exploring Expedition.

Count Imhoff (1865–1939) painted magnificent religious murals within churches at St. Walburg, Muenster, St. Benedict, Bruno, Denzil, Reward, St. Leo, Humboldt, Paradise Hill, North Battleford etc.

Joni Mitchell CC (born Roberta Joan Anderson on November 7, 1943) is a noted Canadian musician, songwriter, and painter.

William Ormond Mitchell PC OC (W. O. Mitchell) (March 13, 1914 – February 25, 1998) born in Weyburn, Saskatchewan, was an author of novels, short stories, and plays such as Who Has Seen The Wind.

Joe Fafard CM SOM (born September 2, 1942) is a Canadian sculptor also taught sculpture at the University of Saskatchewan.

== See also ==
- Harris Saskatchewan Ruby rush of 1914
- Natural Resources Acts
- Politics of Saskatchewan
- Qu'Appelle, Saskatchewan capital for a day
- List of National Historic Sites of Canada in Saskatchewan

== Bibliography ==
- Encyclopedia of Saskatchewan (University of Regina Library – Canadian Plains Research Centre, 2005), online.
- "Saskatchewan" in Canadian Annual Review of Politics and Public Affairs (University of Toronto Press, annual)
- Anderson, A.B. Settling Saskatchewan (University of Regina Press, 2013).
- Archer, John H. "Saskatchewan: A Political History." Canadian Parliamentary Review 8 (1985): 7-12. online
- Archer, John H. Saskatchewan: A History. Saskatoon: Western Producer Prairie Books, 1980. 422 pp.
- Barnhart, Gordon L., ed. Saskatchewan Premiers of the Twentieth Century. Regina: Canadian Plains Research Centre, 2004. 418 pp.
- Black, Norman Fergus. History of Saskatchewan and the old North West (1913) online.
- Boswell, Randy, and Lynn McAuley Province with a heart: celebrating 100 years in Saskatchewan CanWest Books, 2005 ISBN 0-9736719-0-4; popular history
- Burbank, Garin. “Agrarian Socialism in Saskatchewan and Oklahoma: Short-Run Radicalism, Long-Run Conservatism.” Agricultural History, vol. 51, no. 1, 1977, pp. 173–80. online
- Conway, Aidan D., and J.F. Conway. “Saskatchewan: From Cradle of Social Democracy to Neoliberalism’s Sandbox.” in Transforming Provincial Politics: The Political Economy of Canada’s Provinces and Territories in the Neoliberal Era, edited by Bryan M. Evans and Charles W, Smith. (U of Toronto Press, 2015), pp. 226–54. online
- Courville, L.D. "The Conservatism of the Saskatchewan Progressives" Historical Papers / Communications historiques , vol. 9#1 1974, p. 157–181. online
- Danysk, Cecilia. Hired hands: labour and the development of prairie agriculture, 1880–1930 McClelland & Stewart, 1995 ISBN 0-7710-2552-1
- Friesen, Gerald. The Canadian Prairies: A History (2nd ed. 1987)
- Heidt, Daniel. ed. “Creating New Provinces: Saskatchewan and Alberta.” in Reconsidering Confederation: Canada’s Founding Debates, 1864-1999 (U of Calgary Press, 2018), pp. 213–36. online
- Jeannotte, M. Sharon, and Joy Cohnstaedt. “Saskatchewan’s Cultural ‘GDP’: Geography, Demographics, and Politics and the Shaping of Cultural Policy.” in Cultural Policy: Origins, Evolution, and Implementation in Canada’s Provinces and Territories, edited by Diane Saint-Pierre and Monica Gattinger, (University of Ottawa Press, 2021) pp. 385–438. online
- Johnson, A. W. Dream No Little Dreams: A Biography of the Douglas Government of Saskatchewan, 1944–1961 (University of Toronto Press, 2004). JSTOR 10.3138/j.ctt1287srz
- Lam, Vincent. Extraordinary Canadians: Tommy Douglas (2011) online, popular biography
- Leeson, Howard A., ed. Saskatchewan politics: Into the twenty-first century (University of Regina Press, 2001) online.
- Lipset, Seymour Martin Agrarian Socialism (1950), in-depth study of Saskatchewan politics
- Noonan, Brian W., Dianne M. Hallman, and Murray Scharf, eds. A history of education in Saskatchewan: Selected readings (University of Regina Press, 2006). online
- Pitsula, James M. For All We Have and Are: Regina and the Experience of the Great War (2008) online review om 1914-1918
- Porter, Jene M. Perspectives of Saskatchewan University of Manitoba Press, 2008 ISBN 978-0-88755-183-3
- Ray, Arthur J., James Rodger Miller, and Frank Tough. Bounty and benevolence: A history of Saskatchewan treaties (McGill-Queen's Press-MQUP, 2000) online.
- Richards, J. Howard and K.I. Fung, eds. Atlas of Saskatchewan (1969)
- Sinclair, Peter R. "The Saskatchewan CCF: ascent to power and the decline of socialism." Canadian Historical Review 54.4 (1973): 419-433. [
- Stewart, Walter. The Life and Political Times of Tommy Douglas ( 2004)
- Thompson, Christian, ed. Saskatchewan First Nations: Lives Past and Present (University of Regina Press, 2004) online
- Thompson, John Herd. The Harvests of War: The Prairie West, 1914-1918 (1978)
- Waiser, Bill. Saskatchewan: A New History Fifth House (2005), ISBN 1-894856-75-9
- Waiser, Bill. A World We Have Lost: Saskatchewan before 1905 (Fifth House Publishers, 2016)
- Warren, Jim William, and James Warren. On the Side of the People: A History of Labour in Saskatchewan (Coteau Books, 2005) online.
- Whitcomb, Dr. Ed. A Short History of Saskatchewan. (Ottawa: From Sea To Sea Enterprises, 2005). ISBN 0-9694667-3-0
- Widdis, Randy William. "Saskatchewan bound: Migration to a new Canadian frontier." Great Plains Quarterly (1992): 254-268. online
- Young, Walter D. The Anatomy of a Party: The National CCF, 1932–61 (University of Toronto Press, 1969).

=== Historiography ===
- Eisler, Dale. "The Saskatchewan Myth." in The heavy hand of history: Interpreting Saskatchewan’s past (2005): 67-85. online
- Porter, Gemma. "National History and Identity in Saskatchewan Social Studies Curriculum 1970-2008: Narratives of Diversity, Tolerance, Accommodation, and Negotiation" (Dissertation, University of Saskatchewan, 2020) online.
- Waiser, Bill. "Teaching the West and Confederation: A Saskatchewan Perspective." Canadian Historical Review 98.4 (2017): 742–764.
- Wardhaugh, Robert Alexander, Alison Calder History, literature, and the writing of the Canadian Prairies University of Manitoba Press, 2005 ISBN 0-88755-682-5

=== Primary sources ===
- Smith, D.E. ed. Building a Province: A History of Saskatchewan in Documents (Saskatoon: Fifth House, 1992)
