= John McClean =

John McClean may refer to:

- John McClean (bishop) (1914–1978), Bishop of Middlesbrough, 1967–78
- John Robinson McClean (1813–1873), British civil engineer and Liberal Party politician

== See also ==
- John McLean (disambiguation)
- John MacLean (disambiguation)
- Jack McLean (disambiguation)
- John McLane (1852–1911), furniture maker and politician from Milford, New Hampshire
- John McClane, fictional protagonist of the Die Hard film series portrayed by Bruce Willis
