= Heritage Property Act =

Heritage Property Act may refer to:

- Heritage Property Act (Nova Scotia)
- Heritage Property Act (Saskatchewan)

== See also ==
- Historic preservation legislation
