= John Dubh Maclean =

John Dubh Maclean or Ian Dubh Maclean may refer to:

- John Dubh Maclean, 4th Clan Chief
- John Dubh Maclean, 1st Laird of Morvern, founder of the Macleans of Kinlochaine, Drimnin, and Pennycross

== See also ==
- John Maclean (disambiguation)
