= John Garbh Maclean =

John Garbh Maclean may refer to:

- John Garbh Maclean, 1st Laird of Coll (15th century)
- John Garbh Maclean, 7th Laird of Coll (17th century)

== See also ==
- John Maclean (disambiguation)
