= Alice Beck Kehoe =

American anthropologist

Alice Beck Kehoe (born September 18, 1934) is a feminist anthropologist and archaeologist. She has done considerable field research among Native American peoples in the upper plains of the US and Canada and has authored research volumes on Native American archaeology and Native American history. She is also the author of several general anthropology and archaeology textbooks.

== Early life ==
Alice Beck Kehoe was born on September 18, 1934 in New York City to Roman and Lena Beck. Her father was a lawyer, and her mother was a homemaker. She is of Ashkenazi Jewish descent.

== Education ==
Kehoe received a Bachelor of Arts in 1956 from Barnard College, where she graduated Magna cum Laude. In 1964, she received her Phd in anthropology from Harvard University. While a student at Barnard, she was influenced by James Ford, Gordon Ekholm, and Junius Bird; she worked summers at the American Museum of Natural History Anthropology Department. While at Harvard, she worked with Gordon Willey and Evon Vogt. Many of her influences have been colleagues such as David H. Kelley, Jane Kelley, Jennifer Brown, Robert L. Hall, Carl Johannesen and George F. Carter and his student Stephen C. Jett.

== Career ==
Kehoe started her career at the Museum of the Plains Indian in Browning, Montana between the years of 1956 and 1958 as an assistant summer curator. Following her doctoral graduation, she accepted a role as a lecturer at the University of Saskatchewan, Regina Campus. She held this position for one year, from 1964 to 1965. Kehoe held an assistant professor role at the University of Nebraska–Lincoln before earning an associate professor role at Marquette University, both in anthropology. She also was a visiting lecturer in the summer of 1979 at the Institüt für Ethnologie at the University of Tübingen in Tübingen, Germany. She retired in 2000 as professor emeritus after holding a full professorship from 1980 to 1999. She currently resides in Milwaukee, Wisconsin, where she has worked as an adjunct professor since her retirement.

Kehoe has held offices with the American Anthropological Association (AAA), the Society for American Archaeology (SAA), and the Archaeological Institute of America. She was president of both the Central States Anthropological Society (CSAS) and the Association of Senior Anthropologists. She also has held membership status in the American Ethnological Society, American Society for Ethnohistory, Wisconsin Archaeological Survey, Saskatchewan Association of Professional Archaeologists, and the Saskatchewan Archaeological Society.

Kehoe has studied many aspects of Native America and is a strong believer in the theoretical link between the Southeastern Ceremonial Complex (SECC) (of the Native southeastern U.S.) and Mesoamerica (Mexico and Central America). Her principal area of interest is the archaeology and cultures of the northwestern plains of the U.S. While searching for an ethnographic research topic for her dissertation, she happened upon the Saskatchewan Dakota New Tidings Ghost Dance. Kehoe has worked many years with the Blackfeet of the Blackfeet Indian Reservation, an Algonquian Native American group of Browning, Montana, with whom she visits each year to study their history and culture. She has studied Native American spiritual healers ("medicine people") and worked with Piakwutch, "an elderly deeply respected Cree man who served his Saskatchewan Cree community...". She has also worked among Native Americans of Bolivia at Lake Titicaca, where she chewed coca leaves with Native women of the region.

Kehoe has taken some contrarian or controversial positions throughout her career. One of the original proponents of feminist archaeology, she coedited with Sarah Milledge Nelson one of the first collections of feminist archaeology papers, Powers of Observation in 1990. An interest in pre-Columbian transoceanic contacts led to her meeting Richard Nielsen, who asked her to advise on archaeological aspects while testing the Kensington Runestone of Minnesota. Though a majority of relevant scholars have concluded the Runestone is a 19th Century hoax, nevertheless there remains a community convinced of the stone's authenticity. Kehoe has stated that "The significance of a study of the [Kensington Runestone] is its illumination of struggle between popular knowledge and scientific research. For those who can look at the case, as did Newton Winchell, Robert A. Hall, Jr., and Richard Nielsen, the probability that those Norse were at [Kensington] is a fruitful hypothesis, collating data in new configurations and opening up intriguing new research questions."

In 2014, Kehoe published A Passion for the True and Just: Felix and Lucy Kramer Cohen and the Indian New Deal, a dual biography of Felix S. Cohen and Lucy Kramer Cohen. The Cohens, a lawyer and an anthropologist respectively, were instrumental in the research and drafting of the Indian Reorganization Act and The Handbook of Federal Indian Law, two landmarks in Native American law in the United States.

Her memoir of her career as a woman in American archaeology, Girl Archaeologist: Sisterhood in a Sexist Profession, was published in 2022 by University of Nebraska Press.

== Research focus and fieldwork ==
Kehoe has conducted extensive archaeological and ethnographic research across North America. Much of her scholarship focuses on the northwestern Plains, where she combined archaeological field surveys with ethnohistorical research and oral history. Her studies of Blackfeet history and culture draw on decades of fieldwork at the Blackfeet Indian Reservation in Montana, where she conducted interviews, participated in community events, and collaborated with tribal members. Kehoe also investigated revitalization movements, most notably the Saskatchewan Dakota New Tidings Ghost Dance, which informed her doctoral work and later publications. In addition to Plains fieldwork, she conducted research in Bolivia at Lake Titicaca and Tiwanaku and participated in interdisciplinary studies that connected archaeology with Indigenous agriculture, political history, and environmental knowledge.

== Contributions to shamanism studies ==
In Shamans and Religion: An Anthropological Exploration in Critical Thinking (2000), she challenged universalizing definitions such as those proposed by Mircea Eliade, arguing that the term “shaman” has been applied too broadly and often reflects Eurocentric and romanticized interpretations of Indigenous ritual specialists. She explains that the word saman comes from the Tungus/Evenki traditions of Siberia and is thus a culturally-bound term. This means that anthropologists cannot use the term shaman as a blanket term across cultures. Kehoe emphasized historically grounded, community-specific analyses and rejected portrayals of shamans as “exotic” spiritual figures. Her work helped influence later methodological critiques that call for greater attention to Indigenous cosmologies, historical context, and ethnographic specificity when describing religious practitioners.

== Feminist archaeology ==
Kehoe is considered one of the early contributors to feminist archaeology. With Sarah M. Nelson, she coedited Powers of Observation: Alternative Views in Archaeology (1990) one of the first edited volumes to explicitly address feminist perspectives within the discipline. Her 2022 memoir addresses sexism and gender inequality in the field. Kehoe has written extensively about structural inequities in anthropological training and fieldwork practices, emphasizing how gender shaped access to mentorship, research funding, and publication opportunities during the mid-twentieth century. She has argued that women archaeologists were often excluded from leadership roles and that their contributions were frequently undervalued in comparison to those of their male colleagues. Kehoe’s analyses have been cited in broader discussions within feminist science studies and the history of anthropology, particularly for their attention to the lived experiences of women working in remote field sites and male-dominated academic departments. Her work continues to be referenced in scholarship on gender and disciplinary reform.

== Views on archaeology and disciplinary critiques ==
Kehoe has written extensively on the history and politics of American archaeology. Kehoe has advocated for greater inclusion of Indigenous perspectives in archaeological research and for more critical examination of long-standing assumptions about North American prehistory. Her work frequently emphasizes the importance of historical contingency, the influence of colonialism on archaeological narratives, and the need for reflexive scholarship that acknowledges the discipline’s power dynamics. In addition to critiquing archaeological narratives, Kehoe has examined how funding structures, museum practices, and university politics influence what kinds of archaeological questions are pursued. She has argued that professional gatekeeping can limit the range of acceptable interpretations and has encouraged archaeologists to adopt more collaborative approaches with descendant communities. Her later works highlight the ways Indigenous ecological knowledge, oral traditions, and land stewardship practices can complement archaeological data, challenging assumptions embedded in earlier research paradigms. Kehoe’s critiques form part of a larger movement within North American archaeology calling for increased reflexivity, transparency, and ethical accountability.

== Reception and influence ==
Kehoe’s work has been noted for its critical stance toward archaeological and anthropological orthodoxies. Reviews of her publications have highlighted her efforts to situate North American archaeology within Indigenous histories and to question assumptions about “prehistory” and scientific authority. Her book Shamans and Religion: An Anthropological Exploration in Critical Thinking has been cited in debates about the usefulness of “shamanism” as a cross-cultural category, and Powers of Observation: Alternative Views in Archaeology was recognized as an early contribution to feminist perspectives in archaeology. Kehoe’s later works on topics such as ancient transoceanic voyages and the politics of American archaeology continue to be discussed in relation to broader controversies in the discipline.

== Personal life ==
Alice Beck Kehoe married Thomas F. Kehoe on September 18, 1956. They have since divorced. They have three children together, David, Daniel, and Cormac.

== Awards and recognition ==
Alice Beck Kehoe has received many awards and honors, including a Choice Outstanding Academic Book designation in 2001 for her book, Shamans and Religion: An Anthropological Exploration in Critical Thinking. In 2022, her memoir, Girl Archaeologist: Sisterhood in a Sexist Profession, was selected as a Choice Outstanding Academic Title.

In 2016, Kehoe was honored by the Plains Anthropological Association with its Distinguished Service Award. The plaque Kehoe received cited her "enduring work in Anthropology and Archaeology of the Great Plains."

== Works ==
- Kehoe, Alice Beck (1989). The Ghost Dance: Ethnohistory and Revitalization. New York: Holt, Rinehart, and Winston. ISBN 978-1577664536.
- Nelson, Sarah M. and Kehoe, Alice Beck, eds. (1990) Powers of Observation: Alternative Views of Archaeology. Archaeological Papers of AAA Archaeology Division 2. Washington: American Anthropological Association.
- Kehoe, Alice B. (1992). North American Indians: A Comprehensive Account (3rd ed.). Englewood Cliffs, NJ: Prentice Hall. ISBN 978-0131928763.
- Kehoe, Alice Beck (1998). Humans: An Introduction to Four-Field Anthropology. New York: Routledge. ISBN 978-0415919845.
- Kehoe, Alice Beck (1998). The Land of Prehistory: A Critical History of American Archaeology. New York: Routledge. ISBN 978-0415920544.
- Kehoe, Alice Beck; Emmerichs, Mary Beth, eds. (1999). Assembling the Past: Studies in the Professionalization of Archaeology. Albuquerque: University of New Mexico Press. ISBN 978-0826319395.
- Kehoe, Alice Beck (2000). Shamans and Religion: An Anthropological Exploration in Critical Thinking. Prospect Heights, Ill.: Waveland Press. ISBN 978-1577661627.
- Sterk, Helen M.; Hay, Carla H.; Kehoe, Alice B.; Ratcliffe, Krista; VendeVusse, Leona G. (2002). Who's Having this Baby? Perspectives on Birthing. East Lansing: Michigan State University Press. ISBN 978-0870136153.
- Kehoe, Alice Beck (2002). America Before the European Invasions. New York: Longman. ISBN 978-0582414860. Second edition titled North America Before the European Invasions, published 2017 by Routledge, New York.
- Kehoe, Alice Beck (2005). The Kensington Runestone: Approaching a Research Question Holistically. Long Grove, Ill.: Waveland Press. ISBN 978-1577663713.
- Kehoe, Alice Beck; Pleger, Thomas C. (2007). Archaeology: A Concise Introduction. Long Grove, Ill.: Waveland Press. ISBN 978-1577664505.
- Kehoe, Alice Beck (2008). Controversies in Archaeology. Walnut Creek, Calif.: Left Coast Press. ISBN 978-1598740615.
- Kehoe, Alice Beck (2012). Militant Christianity: An Anthropological History. New York: Palgrave Macmillan. ISBN 978-1137282149.
- Wissler, Clark; Kehoe, Alice Beck; Miller, Stewart E. (2012). Amskapi Pikuni: The Blackfeet People. Albany: State University of New York Press. ISBN 978-1438443355.
- Kehoe, Alice (2014). A Passion for the True and Just: Felix and Lucy Kramer Cohen and the Indian New Deal. Tucson: University of Arizona Press. ISBN 978-0816530939.
- Kehoe, Alice (2016). Traveling Prehistoric Seas: Critical Thinking on Ancient Transoceanic Voyages. Walnut Creek, Calif.: Left Coast Press. ISBN 978-1-62958-067-8.
- Kehoe, Alice (2022). Girl Archaeologist: Sisterhood in a Sexist Profession. Lincoln, Nebraska: University of Nebraska Press. ISBN 978-1496229366.
- Kehoe, Alice (2024). Truth and Power in American Archaeology. Lincoln, Nebraska: University of Nebraska Press. ISBN 978-1-4962-4108-5.

== See also ==
- Indigenous archaeology
