= Sir John Maclean =

Sir John Maclean may refer to:

- Sir John Maclean, 4th Baronet (1670–1716), Scottish noble who was the 20th Clan Chief of Clan Maclean from 1674 to 1716
- Sir John Maclean, 1st Baronet (1604–1666), Scottish noble who moved to Sweden and took the name John Hans Makeléer and married Anna Gubbertz
- Sir John MacLean (historian) (1811–1895), British civil servant, genealogist and author

== See also ==
- John MacLean (disambiguation)
- John Makeleer
