= Robin Wettlaufer =

Canadian diplomat

Robin Wettlaufer is a Canadian career diplomat named by the Hill Times in 2021 as one of the most influential voices in Canadian foreign policy, and by La Presse in 2023 as an embodiment of "brave diplomacy"

Since late 2022, she has led Canada's Centre for International Digital Policy, and chairs the G7 Rapid Response Mechanism Canada, countering threats to democracy

Prior to this, she has served most of her career on issues relating to conflict and mediation in the Arab and Muslim worlds. Most recently, she served as the Canadian Representative to the Palestinian Authority between 2019 and 2022 .

From 2014 to 2019, she served as Canada's Special Representative for Syria, for which she is best known for leading the operation to evacuate more than 400 Syrians from the White Helmets and members of their families from southern Syria, as Syrian government forces advanced. The White Helmets had been frequently targeted by the Syrian government and those who were captured, risked imprisonment at the hands of government security

She was awarded the Governor General's Meritorious Service Cross in 2021 for this work Earlier in her tenure on Syria, she also received the prestigious Foreign Service Officer award from the Canadian foreign service union.

In addition to supporting Syria peace efforts, she also served as a senior advisor for the UN-AU-led Darfur Peace Process, and supported the efforts of Canada's former Special Coordinator for the Middle East Peace Process from 2005 to 2008. Previous field assignments include serving as Head of Advocacy and Dialogue, responsible for outreach with muslim communities in Pakistan, and a previous assignment in Ramallah.

At Global Affairs Canada headquarters, she has worked as Deputy Director of the Sudan/South Sudan Task Force, and previously on Iraq, on security sector reform in Afghanistan, as a conflict prevention advisor for the G8, on Indo-Pacific regional security, and on bilateral relations with Japan.

Wettlaufer earned a BA in International Relations from the University of British Columbia in 1998 and an MA in Political Science from York University in 2000. She studied Arabic at both Middlebury College and the American University in Cairo, and is a United World College alumnus.
