= John Walford (librarian) =

British Librarian, bibliographer, and editor (1906 – 2000)

John Walford MBE FRHistS FLA
- Born: Albert John Walford; August 3, 1906; Bermondsey, London, United Kingdom
- Died: January 7, 2000 (aged 93)
- Education: University College London
- Occupations: Librarian; bibliographer; editor
- Notable work: The Guide to Reference Material
- Spouse: Jean Binder (m. 1959)
- Children: 2

Albert John Walford MBE FRHistS FLA (August 3, 1906 – January 7, 2000), frequently published under the name A. J. Walford, was a British librarian, bibliographer, and editor. He is best known for his three-volume Guide to Reference Material, a comprehensive, annotated bibliography of reference works intended for libraries in the United Kingdom. The Guide became an essential reference work in itself and Walford gained the reputation as the most well known British librarian in the world. In addition, Walford served as editor and columnist for the journal Library Association Record.

== Early career and education ==
John Walford was born on August 3, 1906 in Bermondsey, London. Walford's library career began in 1924 as a senior assistant at Stoke Newington Public Library. In 1929, he became of a fellow of the Library Association. From 1932 to 1946, he was chief assistant of Lambeth Public Libraries. During this time, he attended University College London's School of Librarianship part-time, worked towards his BA in History from Birkbeck College by taking evening classes, and attended University College for his MA and Doctorate in Latin American studies under the tutelage of Robin Humphreys. Walford remained interested in this subject throughout his life, leading to his membership in the Royal Historical Society.

Walford served in the British Army during World War II. He was supervisor of the command library network in Italy and North Africa towards the end of the war. In 1946, he began working for the Ministry of Defense where he was in charge of the Joint Intelligence Bureau library, a job he would maintain until 1973.

== Library Association and later career ==
Walford's involvement with the Library Association Record began in 1947 when took up authorship of the column "Reference Libraries". He served as the journal's editor from 1953 to 1959. His tenure as editor saw the publication of Liaison, an inset which focused on timely library news, written in a more accessible, journalistic style. He was also responsible for implementing the Library Association's annual prize essay competition. During this time, Walford became chair of the LA's Reference, Special and Information Section (RSIS), having served as a committee member since its inception in 1951. Walford served on the LA Council from 1962 to 1964. He also served on the judging panel for the Library Association's Besterman and McColvin medals.

In addition to his work with the Library Association, Walford served the profession as a lecturer and secretary to the Aslib Economics Group. He served on several groups and panels of the British Standard Institution working to create standards on documentation.

After leaving the Ministry of Defense, Walford worked as librarian of PEAU Library, part of Commercial Union Assurance Company, until his retirement in 1978.

== The Guide to Reference Material ==
Walford began working on the Guide to Reference Material in 1955 as a cooperative project involving some 70 to 80 contributors, inspired by John Minto's Reference Books (Library Association, 1929). It first was published in 1959 as a single volume, but was so successful that the second edition was expanded into three volumes. Walford's Guide (or just Walford, as it would come to be known) was the first of its kind in the UK—a comprehensive list of all major reference works that would be of greatest use in either public or academic libraries. The United States' equivalent, the American Library Association's Guide to Reference Books, had been around since 1902.

Despite Walford's generosity in attribution and acknowledgement of his co-contributors, he was well-known as being the sole compiler of later editions of the Guide, particularly in the 1960s and 1970s. Colleagues described his dedication for pursuing new titles for the guide even while on vacation, as well as his extensive knowledge of reference sources. According to his own estimate, Walford spent about 1,000 hours a year working on the Guide in addition to his work at the Ministry of Defense. His process involved recording information on slips of scrap paper and organizing them according to Universal Decimal Classification.

In the late 1980s, Walford began to gradually relinquish his compilation duties to a team of editors. The last volume that he oversaw was the fifth edition of Volume 1: Science and Technology, published in 1989. Walford remained peripherally involved with the Guide, often mailing additional scraps of paper with source information to the editing team.

Sales of the Guide were largely responsible for sustaining the Library Association publishing division.

In 2005, Facet Publishing announced The New Walford, a successor series to the original Guide, with a re-imagined structure and content to accommodate the ubiquity of internet resources.

== Personal life ==
In 1959, Walford married Jean Binder, a reference librarian working in London. The two met while serving on Library Association reference committees. They had two sons.

== Death and legacy ==
John Walford died on January 7, 2000 at Watford General Hospital. His death was announced in the February issue of the Library Association Record. His obituary was published in the following issue.

It has been claimed that Walford was perhaps the most famous British librarian in the world during the heyday of the Guide.

In 1991, the Library Association instituted the Walford Medal "to recognise continued and sustained work in the field of bibliography". It is still awarded yearly by the organization.

== Awards and honors ==
- Member of the Most Excellent Order of the British Empire (1964)
- Honorary Fellowship of the Library Association (1972)
- Besterman Medal (1982)

== Selected publications as editor ==
- Guide to Reference Material, Four editions, (1959-1987)
- A Guide to Foreign Language Grammars and Dictionaries (1964). Second (revised and expanded) edition: A Guide to Foreign Language Courses and Dictionaries (1967)
- Basic Stock for the Reference Library (with Charles A. Toase), Four editions (1964-1981)
- Walford's Concise Guide to Reference Materials (1981)
- Walford's Guide to Current Periodicals in the Humanities and Social Sciences (1985)
- Reviews and Reviewing: A Guide (1986)
- The Working Languages of the European Community: A Guide to Learning Resources (1991)
