= Jack McLean =

Jack McLean may refer to:

- Jack McLean (ice hockey) (1923–2003), Canadian ice hockey player
- Jack McLean (mayor) (born 1949/1950), American politician and mayor
- Jack McLean (rugby, born 1923) (1923–2005), New Zealand rugby (union and league) footballer
- Jack McLean (rugby union, born 1922) (1922–1974), Australian rugby union player
- Jack McLean (journalist) (died 2023), Scottish journalist

== See also ==
- John McLean (disambiguation)
