= John McLean (furniture maker) =

John McLean (born 1770; died 1825) was an English furniture and cabinetry maker and designer. He was recognized as one of the best of his era, representing the best in English cabinetmaking. Examples of his furniture can be found in the Victorian and Albert Museum, The California Palace of the Legion of Honor and the Library at Saltram, Devon.

The origins of the McLean firm is somewhat confused by the many variations in spelling the name 'McLean'. "John MacKlane, upholder and cabinet maker in Little Newport Street, off Leicester Square" is listed in 1774. As many as eight different variations of name spellings have been recorded, the problem arising because many people in those days were illiterate and names were written phonetically at the whim of whoever was writing the name at the time.

== History ==
The first appearance of the name 'McLean' can be found on the south side of Little Newport Street, Leicester Square in June 1770, where a "Jn. McLean" rented a "Ho & workshops" until 1783. A trade card for the Newport Street Address advertises that he was a "Cabinet, Chair Maker and Upholder". The rent of the Little Newport premises was valued at £36; because this rent was considerable and the premises were new, this indicates that McLean was already established in business before 1770.

No records have yet been found establishing McLean's whereabouts between 1783 and 1790. From 1790 until the firm's demise in 1825, they are recorded at 55/58 Upper Marylebone Street (now New Cavendish Street) and from c. 1799-1805, later expanding to occupy premises in both Pancras Street and Upper Terrace and continuing in business until 1825. McLean and Son also gained a notable mention in Thomas Sheraton's Cabinet Dictionary in 1803. One of the "fashionable Pieces of Cabinet Furniture" included a "Pouch Table", whose design was taken and "executed by Mr. M'Lean in Mary-le-bone street, near Tottenham court road, who finishes these small articles in the neatest manner".

That John McLean and Son were cabinet-makers of the highest calibre is confirmed by being patronised by such leading connoisseurs as the 5th Earl of Jersey, for whom they worked extensively at Middleton Park, Oxfordshire, and the Earl's London mansion in Berkeley Square. The firm of John McLean and Son advertised that it specialised in "Elegant Parisian Furniture" and although the six surviving pieces that bear his trade label are undoubtedly English, they do owe much to Gallic influence not only in their design.

Trade directories from 1809 give "John McLean & Son, upholders" as from 58 Upper Marylebone Street with his son William McLean at the same address. The business was in serious decline from 1825 as the Marylebone Rate Books reveal rate arrears and bankruptcy. A final journal entry in the same year states, "Died so poor that his body was sent in a box by wagon into the country to relations". The causes for the decline are not clear, although it was common that the notoriously slow payments by clients for completed work caused financial embarrassment to many tradesmen in the eighteenth and nineteenth centuries.
