= Heritage Property Act (Saskatchewan) =

Canadian provincial statute

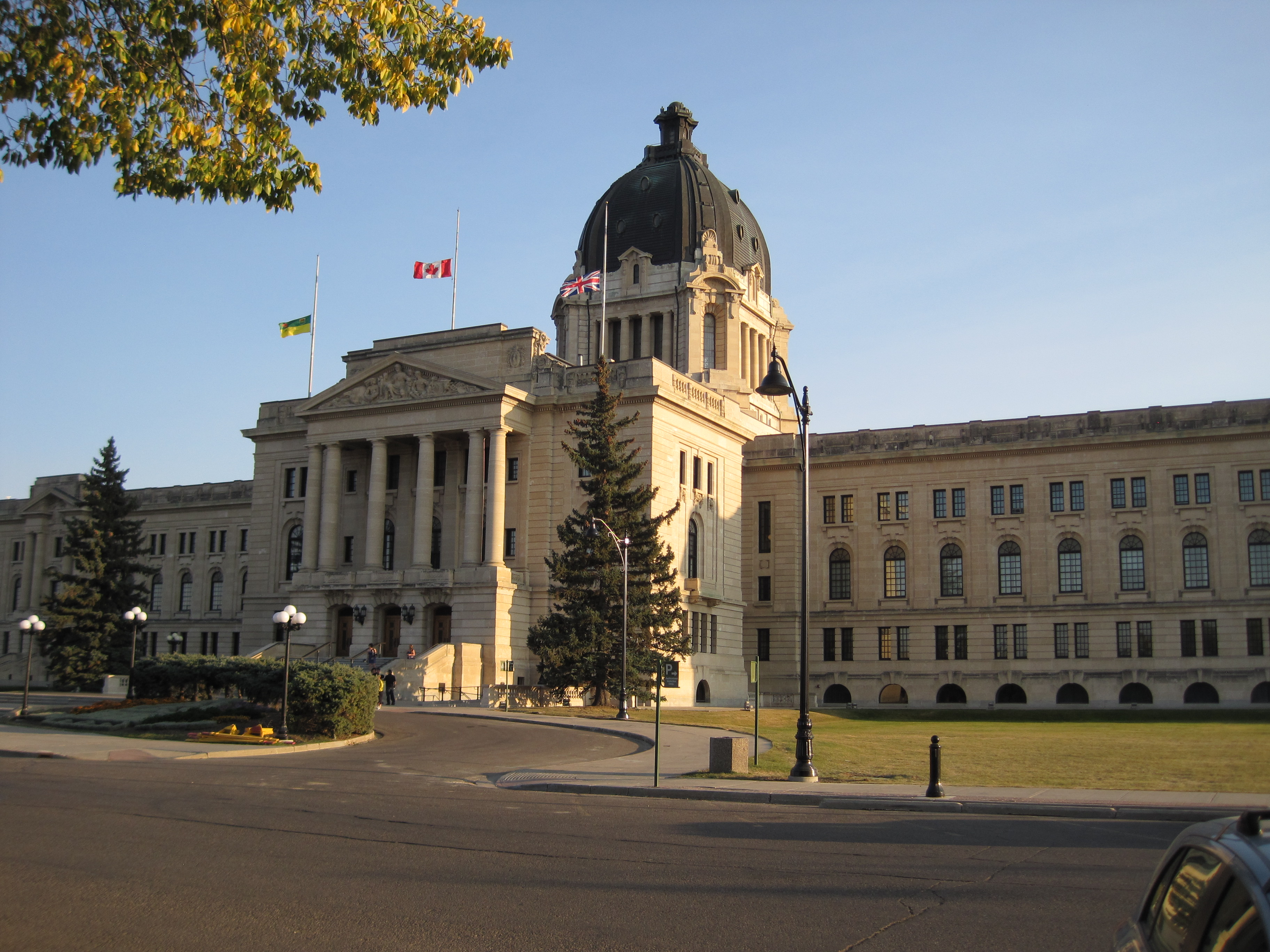
- The Saskatchewan Legislative Building and its grounds were designated a Provincial Heritage Property in 1978

Legislative Assembly of Saskatchewan
- Long title: An Act to provide for the Preservation, Interpretation and Development of Certain Aspects of Heritage Property in Saskatchewan, to provide for the continuance of the Saskatchewan Heritage Foundation and to provide for the naming of Geographic Features'
- Citation: SS 1979-80, c H-2.2
- Territorial extent: Saskatchewan
- Enacted by: Legislative Assembly of Saskatchewan
- Enacted: November 28, 1980
- Status: In force

The Heritage Property Act (the Act) is a provincial statute which allows for the preservation of cultural heritage properties, archaeological sites and palaeontological sites in the province of Saskatchewan, Canada.

== Cultural heritage properties ==
The Act offers two types of protection:

=== Provincial Heritage Properties ===
Provincial Heritage Properties are provincially significant places designated by the Minister of Tourism, Parks, Culture and Sport. As of March 2013, there are 50 such sites in Saskatchewan. Once designated, the property's heritage character-defining elements cannot be altered without the written consent from the Minister, and the site is also eligible for financial assistance from the Saskatchewan Heritage Foundation towards its preservation or restoration.

=== Municipal Heritage Properties ===
Locally or regionally significant places can be designated by a city, town, village or rural municipality. Designation legally protects the property and makes it eligible for financial assistance from the Saskatchewan Heritage Foundation. There are over 750 Municipal Heritage Properties in the province.

The Act also permits municipalities to designate Municipal Heritage Conservation Districts, larger areas whose heritage value lies in their overall area character rather than in individual properties.

== Archaeological and palaeontological sites ==
The Act protects archaeological and palaeontological sites and objects in Saskatchewan. In particular, every archaeological or palaeontological object found in, or taken from, land in Saskatchewan is deemed to be the property of the Crown, and no person may disturb or dislocate such objects without a valid permit issued under the Act.

Also protected are Sites of Special Interest, consisting of First Nations or Métis sites which the Act defines as properties containing any pictographs, petroglyphs, human skeletal material, burial objects, burial places or mounds, boulder effigies or medicine wheels. No one may destroy, deface, excavate or alter such sites.

== Other provisions ==
The Act also provides for:

- the establishment of the Saskatchewan Heritage Foundation, a provincial agency whose primary mandate is to provide financial support to heritage projects within the province;
- the establishment of the Saskatchewan Geographic Names Program;
- the issuance of temporary stop orders requiring a person to cease an activity for up to 60 days where that activity that is likely to result in damage or destruction to any heritage property;
- the voluntary registration of heritage easements and covenants, pursuant to which a landowner agrees to terms and conditions with the province, a municipality or any other heritage organization approved by the Minister ensuring the protection of the heritage property; and
- the imposition of penalties (including fines and imprisonment) for violations of the Act.

== See also ==
- Heritage conservation in Canada
- List of historic places in Saskatchewan
- List of National Historic Sites of Canada in Saskatchewan
