= John MacLean (honorary sheriff) =

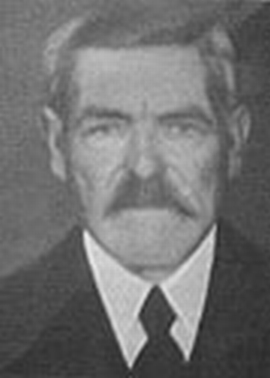
Portrait of Mr. John MacLean

John MacLean (1860–1940) was a pioneer and sheriff in Última Esperanza Province, Magallanes and Antártica Chilena Region, Chile. He was born in Poolewe, Wester Ross, Scotland, emigrating at the age of 23 to the Falklands and Southern Patagonia in 1883. Four years later, he was able to buy property in Punta Arenas and rent public lands at Punta del Monte (north-east Magallanes Territory) in order to raise sheep in 1891. Three years later, John married Mary Ann Cameron, daughter of neighbour and fellow Highlander John Cameron. They had 13 children over the next 26 years. MacLean hand wrote 102 letters as part of his official business, mostly in broken Spanish—it is assumed he was self-taught. The letters were very likely delivered through private arrangements due to the lack of infrastructure in the region at that time. His letters shed light on an otherwise unwritten period in Patagonian history.
