= Johnny McLean =

Scottish footballer

Personal information
- Full name: John A McLean
- Date of birth: 26 March 1881
- Place of birth: Govan, Scotland
- Position: Outside right

Senior career*
Years	Team	Apps	(Gls)
1900–1912	Queen's Park	100	(25)
1903–1904	→ Ayr Parkhouse (loan)	5	(0)
- * Club domestic league appearances and goals

John A. McLean was a Scottish amateur footballer who made 100 appearances in the Scottish League for Queen's Park as an outside right.

== Personal life ==
McLean served as a gunner in the Royal Field Artillery during the First World War.

== Career statistics ==
Appearances and goals by club, season and competition
Club	Season	League			Scottish Cup		Other		Total	
Club	Season	Division	Apps	Goals	Apps	Goals	Apps	Goals	Apps	Goals
Queen's Park	1900–01	Scottish First Division	6	2	2	2	1 (Note: Appearances in Glasgow Merchants Charity Cup)	0	9	4
Queen's Park	1901–02	Scottish First Division	7	2	3	2	1 (Note: Appearance in Glasgow International Exhibition Cup)	0	11	4
Queen's Park	1903–04	Scottish First Division	4	2	1	0	1	0	6	2
Queen's Park	1904–05	Scottish First Division	20	1	1	0	2 (Note: 1 appearance in Glasgow Cup, 1 appearance in Glasgow Merchants Charity Cup)	0	23	1
Queen's Park	1905–06	Scottish First Division	10	4	2	0	2	1	14	5
Queen's Park	1906–07	Scottish First Division	15	5	5	4	1	1	21	10
Queen's Park	1907–08	Scottish First Division	19	3	5	2	3 (Note: 2 appearances in Glasgow Merchants Charity Cup, 1 appearance in Glasgow Cup)	0	27	5
Queen's Park	1908–09	Scottish First Division	19	6	3	2	2 (Note: Appearances in Glasgow Cup)	1	24	9
Queen's Park	Total		100	25	22	12	13	3	135	40
Ayr Parkhouse (loan)	1904–05	Scottish Second Division	5	0	—		—		5	0
Career total			105	25	22	12	13	3	140	40
