= John Walford McLean =

British dentist (1925–2009)

John Walford McLean OBE RNVR (28 February 1925 – 29 June 2009) was a British dentist and dental historian. He was known, in the words of the British Dental Journal, for his "groundbreaking developments in high strength dental ceramics and, in particular, to the introduction of glass-ionomer cements, not to forget his seminal work on the bonding of resins to remaining tooth tissues." He was elected President of the British Society of Restorative Dentistry in 1973 and president of the British Dental Association in 1984, and received the John Tomes Prize for research and the American Prosthodontic Society's Golden Medallion.

McLean was born in Rhiwbina, a suburb of Cardiff, and educated at Westminster Abbey Choir School where he was the head chorister. He was appointed an Officer of the Order of the British Empire for his contribution to dental research.

He received a master's in dentistry from the University of London. For two decades, he was a consulting professor at Louisiana State University's School of Dentistry.

== Selected publications ==
- The science and art of dental ceramics
