= Saskatchewan Archaeological Society =

Society of amateur and professional archaeologists in Saskatchewan, Canada

The Saskatchewan Archaeological Society is a society of amateur and professional archaeologists who encourage the preservation of archaeological artifacts and sites, publish, educate, and assist the public in the interest of archaeological activities in Saskatchewan, Canada. The Saskatchewan Archaeological Society also helps to form local branches of archaeological communities, such as the Regina Archaeological Society. Many of the archaeology sites of Saskatchewan are of aboriginal ancestry and include rock paintings, habitation sites, medicine wheels, as well as kill and processing sites. Archaeology focuses on the anthropological study of human history and lifestyle using artifacts.

== Saskatchewan archaeological sites ==
According to the 'Map of Saskatchewan Archaeology', there are more than 20,000 archaeological sites in Saskatchewan. The Saskatchewan Heritage Branch of the Saskatchewan Government manages the archaeological site files. An introduction to some of the archaeological sites around and about Saskatchewan are:

- Stanley Mission — Aboriginal history
- The Aboriginal Rock Paintings of the Churchill River — Aboriginal history
- Waterway sites such as the Sjovold Site south of Outlook
- Ancient Echoes Interpretive Centre at Herschel that consists of petroglyphs, paleontology, aboriginal, and pre-historic/dinosaur finds
- Wanuskewin Heritage Park — archaeological interest near Saskatoon
- St. Victor Petroglyphs Provincial Park
- Bushfield West site near Nipawin
- Fort Pelly and other historic trading post sites
- Rescue Archaeology excavation of the Doukhobor Kirilovka village site

== See also ==
- List of archaeological sites sorted by country
- List of archaeological periods
- GIS in archaeology
- Excavation
- Virtual artifact
- Boyd Wettlaufer, Father of Saskatchewan archaeology
