= John Maclean (pastor) =

Canadian pastor and writer on American-Indians

John Maclean (1851–1928), born John McLean, was a Wesleyan Methodist pastor amongst the Indians of the Canadian Northwest, holding pastorates in various towns of western Canada, including Port Arthur, Ontario July 1892-June 1896. He was born 30 October 1851 in Kilmarnock, Scotland, then moved to Canada. He died 7 March 1928 at Winnipeg, Manitoba.

He learned the languages and customs of the Indians. He published: Lone Land lights, (1890); James Evans, Inventor of the Syllabic System of the Cree Language, (1890); The Indians of Canada, (1892); Canadian Savage Folk, (1896); Language and Religion, (1899); Life among the Ojibwa and Cree Indians, (1903); Life of William Black, (1907); Winning the Front Place, (1908).

He edited the Wesleyan (1902–06) and attained several important offices in his denomination.
