= Boyd Wettlaufer =

Boyd Nicholas David Wettlaufer, CM (2 May 1914 – 27 November 2009) was a Canadian archaeologist, considered as 'the Father of Saskatchewan Archaeology.' His groundbreaking archaeological work in western Canada is considered the foundation of our knowledge of the Northern Plains First Nations people.

Wettlaufer was born in Asquith, Saskatchewan, Canada. He joined the Royal Canadian Air Force in 1938 and was stationed in Alberta, Canada when he discovered the Belly River meteorite. He subsequently attended the University of New Mexico in Albuquerque, New Mexico, where he studied archaeology.

During the 1940s and 1950s, Wettlaufer played a key role in the excavations of the Head-Smashed-In Buffalo Jump site in Alberta and the Mortlach and Long Creek sites in Saskatchewan. Wettlaufer's work at Head-Smashed-In Buffalo Jump would lead eventually to its designation as a UNESCO World Heritage Site in 1981. He was one of the first archaeologists in Canada to use the radiocarbon dating method to establish the ages of various layers of settlements. His reports provided invaluable information on the differences between various hunting and gathering cultures dating back several thousand years.

Wettlaufer died in 2009 in Victoria, British Columbia, aged 95.
