= Hector MacLean =

Hector MacLean may refer to:

== Clan chiefs ==
Many chiefs of Clan Maclean have been called Hector or Eachann, including:

- Red Hector of the Battles Maclean (1368–1411), 6th Clan Chief, killed at the Battle of Harlaw, also known as "Red Hector"
- Hector Odhar Maclean (?–1513), 9th Clan Chief, also known as "Hector the Sallow"
- Hector Mor Maclean, 12th Chief (1497–1568), 12th Clan Chief, also known as "Hector the Great"
- Hector Og Maclean, 13th Chief (c. 1540–1573), also known as "Hector the Younger"
- Hector Odhar MacLean of Lochbuie, 9th Chief (1575–1628)
- Sir Hector Og Maclean, 15th Chief (1583–1623), 15th Clan Chief
- Hector Og Maclean of Brolas (1600s), son of Donald Maclean, 1st Laird of Brolas and grandson of Hector Og Maclean, 15th Chief
- Hector Mor Maclean, 16th Chief (c. 1600–1626), 16th Clan Chief
- Sir Hector Maclean, 2nd Baronet (c. 1620–1651), 18th Clan Chief, killed at the Battle of Inverkeithing
- Sir Hector Maclean, 5th Baronet (c. 1700–1750/1), 21st Clan Chief
- Sir Hector Maclean, 7th Baronet (1783–1818), 23rd Clan Chief
- Hector Maclean, 4th Laird of Coll (fl. 1560)
- Hector Roy Maclean, 5th Laird of Coll, son of the 4th laird of Coll
- Hector Roy MacLean of Coll (1600s), son of John Garbh Maclean, 7th Laird of Coll
- Hector Maclean, 2nd Laird of Torloisk
- Hector Reaganach Maclean, 1st Laird of Lochbuie

== Others ==
- Hector Maclean (politician) (1751–after 1799), English-born soldier, farmer and political figure in Nova Scotia
- Angus Duncan Hector Maclean (1818–1893), story collector, see Calum Maclean
- Hector Lachlan Stewart MacLean (1870–1897), Scottish recipient of the Victoria Cross
- Hector MacLean (RAF officer) (1913–2007), Battle of Britain fighter pilot

== See also ==
- Hector McLean (1864–1888), Australian-born rower
