= Sir Hector Og Maclean, 15th Chief =

Sir Hector Og MacLean of Duart, 15th Clan Chief

15th Clan Chief 11th Laird of Duart
- Preceded by: Lachlan Mor Maclean, 14th Chief, father
- Succeeded by: Hector Mor Maclean of Dowart, 16th Clan Chief, son

Personal details
- Born: Hector Og MacLean; 1583
- Died: 1623 (age 40)
- Spouse(s): Janet Mackenzie of Kintail; Isabella Acheson of Gosford
- Children: Hector Mor Maclean of Dowart, 16th Clan Chief; Lachlan Maclean of Morvaren, 17th Clan Chief; Donald MacLean, 1st Laird of Brolas; Sir John Maclean, 1st Baronet
- Parent: Sir Lachlan Mor Maclean
- Nickname(s): Hector the Younger; Hector Maclean of Duart; Eachann Og MacGill-Eain (Gaelic); Eachann Og Maclean

Sir Hector Og Maclean (1583–1623), or Eachann Óg Maclean in Scottish Gaelic, was the 15th Clan Chief of Clan Maclean in Scotland.

== Early years ==
He was born in 1583, the son of Sir Lachlan Mor Maclean the 14th Clan Chief. His father, Sir Lachlan, was killed in the Battle of Traigh Ghruinneart. Hector, then twenty years old, was then made Chief of Clan Maclean. His first act was to retaliate against Clan MacDonald for the death of his father.

== Battle of Benbigrie ==
He obtained a commission of fire and sword against the MacDonalds of Islay, and summoned the Chief of the Clan Mackinnon, MacLeod of Dunvegan, and MacNeil of Barra to his assistance in 1598 at the Battle of Benbigrie.

The Chief of the Camerons of Lochiel joined this force with his clan. The united clans, fully equipped, proceeded to Islay. Sir James MacDonald, 9th of Dunnyveg, in anticipation of this movement on the part of the young Lord of Duard, mustered together the whole gathering of Islay and Kintyre, and prepared himself for a conflict which he had reason to believe would be of a sanguinary nature. The hostile parties met at a place called Benbigrie, and as neither felt disposed to offer nor to accept terms, the result was an immediate battle. The followers of the Chief of Clan MacLean, upon this occasion, considerably outnumbered the MacDonalds; but Sir James MacDonald, 9th of Dunnyveg, well aware that he need hope for no reconciliation with his enraged kinsman, told his followers that in a resolute resistance alone existed any hope of safety to themselves or of protection to their homes. The MacDonalds, goaded to desperation by a knowledge of these facts, fought with uncontrollable fury, and it was not until the heights of Benbigrie were covered with their slain, and their chief carried off the field dangerously wounded, that their assailants succeeded in routing them. Overwhelmed by numbers the unfortunate MacDonalds were at length obliged to give way and fly in the utmost confusion, not knowing whither, neither mountain nor valley afforded them shelter from their victorious pursuers. A few, however, carrying with them their wounded chief, made their way to Kintyre, leaving Islay a prey to the ruthless invaders.

For three days the allied clans pursued the work of destruction with remorseless barbarity throughout the island. Every human habitation was burned to the ground; and the poor inhabitants were left to seek their only shelter in caves and clefts of rocks among the mountains, without fuel and without food. The career of the merciless victors only ceased when the work of destruction was complete. The Chief of the Camerons of Lochiel had the satisfaction of taking Hector MacLean of Lochbuie, 9th Chief, who aided the MacDonalds against his own chief, with several of his followers, prisoners of war, and detained them in chains for six months. Hector MacLean of Lochbuy, however, soon after had ample opportunity of being even with the Chief of the Camerons of Lochiel. Of all the conflicts between these two clans, this, the last, was the most sanguinary and destructive. The MacLeans and their confederates no doubt felt themselves justified in executing signal vengeance upon their enemies, for the treachery displayed during the Battle of Traigh Ghruinneart, and the loss there of so distinguished a chief. They were also forced to make the destruction as complete as possible, for the conduct of Sir James MacDonald, 9th of Dunnyveg had made him popular with his clan, and his actions had met their approval. However deplorable may have been the loss of life, and the sufferings endured by the innocent and helpless, the result was to put a final and effectual end to the struggle between the contending clans. Ever after the Battle of Benbigrie the MacLeans and MacDonalds laid aside their animosities, and lived on the happiest terms of friendship and reciprocal good will. In the year 1599, James VI of Scotland, finding the Royal Exchequer still in a depleted condition, again turned his eyes toward the Western Isles, and decided that the chiefs should be mulcted in a sufficient amount to meet his demands, so he appointed a new commission of lieutenandry over the whole Isles and Highlands of Inverness-shire, which was granted to the Ludovic Stewart, 2nd Duke of Lennox and George Gordon, 1st Marquess of Huntly, the latter having been recently restored to favor. Although the official document, which sets forth the reasons for the action of the king, gives a shocking picture of the Islesmen, yet this clause establishes the true import of the commission: "And besides all their other crimes, they rebelliously withhold from his Majesty a great part of the patrimony and proper rent of the crown, deprive the country of the benefit which might redound thereto, by the trade of fishing, and of other commodities which these bounds render." And now, at last, a great part of them have banded, conspired, and daily practice, by force and policy, in their barbarous and rebellious form, to disappoint his Majesty's service in the Lewis. As to the extent which this lieutenandry was acted upon is now uncertain. It is positive, however, that as a matter of justice, but little was due the crown from rents, and the amount demanded was beyond the ability of the chiefs to meet. In 1601, another commission of lieutenandry was granted to the same parties; the South of Argyleshire Isles included under the immediate charge of Lennox. These lieutenants were charged to assist certain colonists who would be better able greatly to augment the king's rents. Power was given them to use force and pursue the Islesmen with fire and sword. Rewards were offered these commissioners for the faithful performance of the duty assigned to them.

== Forfeiture of his estates ==
Acting upon his authority, the George Gordon, 1st Marquess of Huntly, who had charge of the northern districts, summoned a convention of estates, to meet at Stirling, Scotland within a given period, under a penalty of forfeiture against an absentee, but many of the northern chiefs, from the distance they had to travel, and the limited period allowed for their appearance, were unable to be in attendance on the day appointed. As Hector Og Maclean owned the lands of Garbhghambluch, in Lochaber, he started at once for Stirling. On arriving there, he met George Gordon, 1st Marquess of Huntly on the street early on the morning that his name was to be called. After George Gordon, 1st Marquess of Huntly had saluted him, MacLean asked him if he thought he would have time to change his clothes before the roll would be called. Huntly answered he had plenty of time. On repairing to his lodging, Hector learned the convention was in session, and immediately hurried to the assembly, and on arriving there found his name had been called. On parting with Hector in the street, Huntly went direct to the convention, and determined at once to put in execution the threat he had uttered against Sir Lachlan Mor Maclean, on account of the latter's proposal to bring George Gordon, 1st Marquess of Huntly dead or alive, the night after the Battle of Glenlivat; so he ordered MacLean's name called at once, and as the latter was not present, Huntly immediately applied for the forfeit, procured it, and is still in the possession of it. All the friends and interest that Hector could make, or bring to bear on the king, were never able to reverse the sentence, as Huntly always made great opposition. Thus he felt himself amply revenged on the son of Sir Lachlan Mor Maclean. Hector Og Maclean died in 1623.

== Marriage and children ==
Maclean's first marriage was to Janet Mackenzie of Kintail, the second daughter of Colin Cam Mackenzie of Kintail They had two sons:

- Hector Mor Maclean, 16th Clan Chief (circa 1600–1626), his eldest son, who succeeded his father as clan chief.
- Sir Lachlan Maclean, 1st Baronet (circa 1600–1649), succeeded his elder brother as the 17th Clan Chief after his brother's death in 1626 until his own death in 1649.

Maclean's second marriage was to Isabella Acheson of Gosford. She was the daughter of Sir Archibald Acheson, 1st Baronet. They also had two sons:

- Donald MacLean, 1st Laird of Brolas (circa 1600–after 1655) His great-grandson, Sir Allan Maclean, 6th Baronet became the 22nd Clan Chief when the 21st Chief died without an heir.
- Sir John Maclean, 1st Baronet (1604-1666). He moved to Sweden and took the name John Hans Makeléer and married Anna Gubbertz (circa 1605-1653)

== Ancestry and descendants ==
Ancestors of Hector Og Maclean

Lachlan Cattanach Maclean, 11th Clan Chief
Hector Mor Maclean, 12th Clan Chief
Marion Maclean
Hector Og Maclean, 13th Clan Chief
Alexander Mac Ian Cathanach, Lord of Islay and Glenns
Mary MacDonnell
Katherine MacDonnell
Sir Lachlan Mor Maclean, 14th Clan Chief
Colin Campbell, 3rd Earl of Argyll
Archibald Campbell, 4th Earl of Argyll
Jean Gordon of Huntly
Lady Janet Campbell of Argyll
William Graham, 3rd Earl of Menteith
Lady Margaret Graham of Menteith
Margaret Mowbray
Hector Og Maclean, 15th Chief
William Cunningham, 4th Earl of Glencairn
Alexander Cunningham, 5th Earl of Glencairn
Katherine Borthwick
William Cunningham, 6th Earl of Glencairn
James Hamilton, 1st Earl of Arran
Janet Hamilton of Arran
Janet Beaton
Lady Margaret Cunningham of Glencairn
Sir Robert Gordon of Lochinvar
Sir James Gordon of Lochinvar
Marion Accarson
Janet Gordon of Lochinvar
Robert Crichton of Kirkpatrick
Margaret Crichton
Egidia Grierson

Descendants of Hector Og Maclean

Maclean's first marriage was to Janet Mackenzie of Kintail, the second daughter of Colin Cam Mackenzie of Kintail They had two sons:

1. Hector Mor Maclean, 16th Clan Chief (circa 1600–1626), his eldest son, who succeeded his father as clan chief
2. Sir Lachlan Maclean, 1st Baronet (circa 1600–1649), succeeded his elder brother as the 17th Clan Chief after his brother's death in 1626 until his own death in 1649. He married Mary MacLeod, the second daughter of Sir Roderick Macleod of Macleod, 15th Chief, by whom he had two sons and three daughters:
  1. Isabella Maclean (c1630-?), who married Sir Ewen Cameron of Lochiel (1629–1719)
  2. Mary Maclean, who married Lachlan MacKinnon
  3. Marian Maclean, who died young and unmarried
  4. Sir Hector Maclean, 2nd Baronet (c1640-1651), his heir and successor
  5. Sir Allan Maclean, 3rd Baronet (1645-1674)
    1. Sir John Maclean, 4th Baronet (1670–1716)
      1. Sir Hector Maclean, 5th Baronet of Morvern (c.1700-1750/1751). He died without any children and the title went to his cousin: Sir Allan Maclean, 6th Baronet

Maclean's second marriage was to Isabella Acheson of Gosford. She was the daughter of Sir Archibald Acheson, 1st Baronet. They also had two sons:

1. Donald MacLean, 1st Laird of Brolas (circa 1600–after 1655) He married Florence Maclean, the daughter of John Garbh Maclean, 7th Laird of Coll and had the following children:
  1. Lauchlan Maclean, 2nd Laird of Brolas (1650–1687), who was the Member of Parliament for Argyllshire.
    1. Donald Maclean, 3rd Laird of Brolas (circa 1670-1725)
      1. Sir Allan Maclean, 6th Baronet (1710–1783), he became the 6th Baronet when his cousin, the 5th Baronet died without an heir. He only had daughters with Anne (Una, 1728-1760), daughter of Hector Maclean, 11th of Coll (c. 1689-1754), also referred to as 14th Laird of Coll or 12th of Coll, so the title then passed to his cousin. His children were:
        1. Maria Maclean, married Charles Maclean of Kinlochaline
        2. Sibella Maclean, married John Maclean of Inverscadell
        3. Ann Maclean, married Dr. Mackenzie Grieve of Edinburgh
  2. Mor Maclean of Brolas
  3. Hector Og Maclean of Brolas, who married Janet, daughter of MacNeil of Barra. He had a son: John Maclean of Brolas who married Finovia of Garmony. John Maclean of Brolas then had as his son:
    1. Donald Maclean of Brolas who had:
      1. Sir Hector Maclean, 7th Baronet
      2. Sir Fitzroy Jeffreys Grafton Maclean, 8th Baronet
2. John Hans Maclean, 1st Baronet (1604-1666). He moved to Sweden and took the name John Hans Makeléer and married Anna Gubbertz (circa 1605-1653)
  1. Charles Makeléer who died young
  2. Jacob Makeléer (1632-1663) was in the service of Charles XI of Sweden in England. He married Catherine Cochrane, the daughter of Colonel John Cochrane. Jacob may have taken his own life during an illness
  3. Johan Makeléer, 2nd Baronet (c1630-1696), of the Gothenburg Court of Justice, who married Anna Margareta Gordon and had as their children:
    1. Sir Johan Jacob Makeléer, 3rd Baronet
    2. Sir Gustav Makeléer, 4th Baronet. Gustav was the father of:
      1. Sir Johan Gabriel Macklear, 5th Baronet who married Hedwig Rosenquist
  4. Peter Makeléer was colonel and commandant in Stralsund, and he married Abolla Sophia Vanplassen
  5. Gustavus Makeléer was colonel in the Swedish army and commandant in Gothenburg
  6. Carl Leonard Makeléer (1633-1663)
  7. Maria Makeléer who married General David Duncan who was in the service of the king of Denmark
  8. Catharina Makeléer (1637-1709) who married, first, Colonel David Sinclair, and secondly, General Malcolm Hamilton
  9. Eliza Makeléer, who was married to Major Cailenkerheilm
  10. Anna Makeléer (1638-1646)
  11. Lunetta Makeléer (1639-1693) who married Joakim Cronman (c.1640-1703). He was a Colonel and the Commandant at Neumünde. This is the Ruuth-Näslund-Winblad line.
  12. Maria Sophia Makeléer (1640-1721)
  13. Gustaf Adolf Makeléer (1641-1706) who was a Captain in the Swedish Army who married Sara Carlberg (1647-1701)
  14. Elsa Beata Makeléer (1643-1730) who married Major Marten Christensson
  15. David Makeléer (1645-1708), a General in the army and the first governor of Älvsborg County, Sweden from 1693 to 1708 who married the countess of Arenberg. General David left five sons and two daughters, of whom John Aldolphus MacLean was general in the army and colonel of the king's life guards.
    1. Baron Rutger Macklier (1688-1748) who married baroness Vilhelmina Eleonora Coyet and had as their sons:
      1. David Macklean
      2. Baron Rutger Macklean
    2. Count John Adolphus Maclean was general in the army and colonel of the king's life guards.
