= Sir Lachlan Maclean, 1st Baronet =

Scottish clan chief (c. 1600 – 1649)

Sir Lachlan Maclean
- 1st Baronet, of Morvern; 13th of Duart
- Tenure: 1626–1649
- Predecessor: Hector Mor Maclean, 16th Chief (brother)
- Successor: Sir Hector Maclean, 2nd Baronet (son)
- Born: Lachlan Maclean c. 1600
- Died: 18 April 1649
- Spouse: Mary MacLeod (daughter of Sir Rory Mor Macleod)
- Issue: Sir Hector Maclean, 2nd Baronet; Sir Allan Maclean, 3rd Baronet
- Parents: Hector Og Maclean, 15th Clan Chief; Janet Mackenzie of Kintail

Sir Lachlan Maclean, 1st Baronet of Morvern, (c. 1600 – 18 April 1649) was a Scottish nobleman and the 17th Chief of Clan Maclean. He was granted his Baronet title by Charles I and he became the Clan Chief on the death of his brother in 1626. He fought as a Royalist under James Graham, 1st Marquess of Montrose during the Wars of the Three Kingdoms at the Battle of Inverlochy, Battle of Auldearn and Battle of Kilsyth. From 1628 to 1633 he sat in the Parliament of Scotland as shire commissioner for Tarbert. From his rule onward, all Maclean clan chiefs are successive Baronets of Movern.

== Biography ==
He was the second son of Hector Og Maclean, 15th Clan Chief. His mother was the daughter of Colin Mackenzie of Kintail. He became Clan Chief at the death of his brother in 1626. He was originally contacted by Archibald Campbell, 1st Marquess of Argyll at the beginning of the Wars of the Three Kingdoms (1644–1651), but he sided with the Royalists.

The evening before the Battle of Inverlochy he met with Montrose in Lochaber. [He was] present at the battle accompanied with 30 men only. After which coming home he raised his whole Clan, and joined Montrose immediately after the Battle of Alford, and continued with him till after the Battle of Kilsyth. When coming home he and the brave Alasdair MacColla defeated a party of Argyle's consisting of seven hundred men at Laggan mor in Lorn, they having but about two hundred, the rest of their men being severed from them by the darkness of the preceding night. He made ready a second time for joining Montrose, and, after he began his march, he was acquainted that the King had ordered Montrose to disband his Army. Upon [which] Maclean kept himself quietly at home. Sometime after Sir David Leslie coming to the Island of Mull with a strong party of horse and foot obliged him to deliver eight Irish gentlemen, who sheltered themselves with him. Seven of whom were executed at Aros, the eighth making his escape by the swiftness of his horse.

Sir Lachlan Maclean was married to Mary MacLeod, the second daughter of Sir Roderick Macleod of Macleod, 15th Chief, by whom he had two sons and three daughters:

- Isobel Maclean (circa 1630-?), who married Sir Ewen Cameron of Lochiel (1629–1719)
- Mary Maclean, who married Sir Lachlan "Mor" Mackinnon (28th clan chief)
- Marian Maclean, who died young and unmarried
- Sir Hector Maclean, 2nd Baronet (c1640-1651), his heir and successor
- Sir Allan Maclean, 3rd Baronet (1645–1674)

He had ruled for twenty three years before his own death in 1649. He was succeeded by his eldest son, Sir Hector Maclean, 2nd Baronet.

== Ancestors ==
Sir Lachlan Maclean, 1st Baronet's ancestors in three generations
Sir Lachlan Maclean, 1st Baronet	Father: Hector Og Maclean	Paternal Grandfather: Sir Lachlan Mor Maclean	Paternal Great-Grandfather: Eachuinn Og Maclean
Sir Lachlan Maclean, 1st Baronet	Father: Hector Og Maclean	Paternal Grandfather: Sir Lachlan Mor Maclean	Paternal Great-grandmother: Janet, daughter of Archibald Campbell, 4th Earl of Argyll
Sir Lachlan Maclean, 1st Baronet	Father: Hector Og Maclean	Paternal Grandmother: Margaret Cunningham of Glencairn	Paternal Great-Grandfather: William Cunningham, 6th Earl of Glencairn
Sir Lachlan Maclean, 1st Baronet	Father: Hector Og Maclean	Paternal Grandmother: Margaret Cunningham of Glencairn	Paternal Great-Grandmother: Janet, daughter of Sir John Gordon of Lochinvar
Sir Lachlan Maclean, 1st Baronet	Mother: Janet MacKenzie of Kintail	Maternal Grandfather: Colin Mackenzie of Kintail	Maternal Great-Grandfather: Kenneth Mackenzie of Kintail
Sir Lachlan Maclean, 1st Baronet	Mother: Janet MacKenzie of Kintail	Maternal Grandfather: Colin Mackenzie of Kintail	Maternal Great-Grandmother: Elizabeth, daughter of John Stewart, 2nd Earl of Atholl
Sir Lachlan Maclean, 1st Baronet	Mother: Janet MacKenzie of Kintail	Maternal Grandmother: Barbara Grant	Maternal Great-grandfather: John Grant of Grant
Sir Lachlan Maclean, 1st Baronet	Mother: Janet MacKenzie of Kintail	Maternal Grandmother: Barbara Grant	Maternal Great-Grandmother: Lady Marjory Stewart

Baronetage of Nova Scotia
New creation	Baronet (of Duart and Morvern); 1631–1649	Succeeded by Hector Maclean
