= Lachlan Maclean, 6th Laird of Coll =

17th-century Scottish noble

Lachlan Maclean, 6th Laird of Coll succeeded his father Hector to this title to lands on the Scottish island of Coll. He was succeeded by his son John at some point in the 17th century.

== Biography ==
He was the son of Hector Roy Maclean, 5th Laird of Coll who died before December 1596. Lachlan was quite a prominent figure in his day. Although there is no documentary evidence, one legend recounts that a Grand Uncle during his minority Niall Mor Maclean acted as his guardian. At this time Sir Lachlan Mor Maclean renewed the old quarrel with Coll, in order to compel obedience to his chiefship. The invaders were met by Niall Mor Maclean, but on his way to the encounter found that the flag had been forgotten. After some annoyance, an old warrior named Domhnall Mugach, seeing the perplexity of his leader, stepped forward, took off his bonnet, and pointing to his bald head exclaimed: "This will do for our standard, and I promise it will not go back a foot till night."

The two parties met at Struthan nan Ceann, at Totaranald, where the invaders were defeated with great slaughter. Shortly after, Sir Lachlan Mor Maclean sent a more numerous force and subjugated the island. Niall Mor Maclean fled with Sir Lachlan's men in pursuit, and overtook him at Clachan Dubh, in northern Mull, where they slew him. Niall Mor Maclean is supposed to have been a son of Hector Maclean, 4th Laird of Coll. He was a man of great strength and stature, and a brave, disinterested man.

One of the first acts of Lachlan was to free his lands from the hands of Sir Lachlan Mor Maclean of Duart and Rory Beg Maclean, who had taken possession of them during his minority. He petitioned to the privy council for redress, which granted his prayer. In this bill of complaint it is stated that his possessions consisted of the twenty pound land of Coll, twelve pound land of Quinish, four pound land of Rum, four pound land of Achalennan, and Drimnin, all of which belonged to his father. This record is dated 23 December 1596.

In 1601 he was one of the principal parties who effected a reconciliation between the MacDonalds of Sleat and MacLeans of Duart. In 1609 he was one of the chiefs who met the Bishop of the Isles at Iona, when the Statutes of Iona were enacted. He was one of the many chiefs summoned, in 1615, to defend the islands against the inroads of Sir James MacDonald, then in rebellion. He appeared before the privy council in 1616, which bound him to exhibit annually one of his principal kinsmen; that he should reside at his castle at Breachacha, and that he should not keep more than one tun of wine. He also made his personal appearance in the following year. In 1622 the Privy Council, along with others, bound him to certain acts which were deemed necessary for the welfare of the Isles, among which he should build and repair the parish kirk.

In the report of 1634, relative to the fisheries and other matters, he is mentioned as one of the principal landlords of the Isles. He received a charter from the bishop of the Isles of the six marklands of the Isle of Muck, which had been possessed by the MacIains of Ardnamurchan, and had remained as tenants of the bishop. These people not only kept possession of the land, but became violent, and among other things murdered Lachlan's natural son, called Ian Gallda Maclean.

This young man had been given by his father a farm, called Mingary, in Mull, for his patrimony. He went to Ardnamurchan upon some private business, when a party of MacIans attacked the boat in landing, and killed Iain (also translated as John or Ewen), and with great difficulty his servants carried off the body, which had thirteen arrows through it. For this and other crimes Coll caused fourteen of the principal men to be apprehended at Ardmore in Mull, and sent them to Inverary, where most of them were put to death. For this they afterward sought revenge.

It must be this Lachlan who converted his tenants from Catholicism to Presbyterianism. The story is well authenticated and doubtless true. When Coll became convinced of the truths of the reformed doctrines, he passed over into Mull, and converted his tenants, by meeting them when going to chapel, and driving them back into a barn where the presbyterian clergyman was to preach; and having used on this occasion a gold-headed cane, it passed into a saying that their religion was that of the yellow-headed stick. This cane remained in the family until quite recently, when it either became lost or else purloined.

While young, Lachlan was fourteen years in the laird of Macintosh's house, and ever after the strictest friendship existed between the families. Rorie MacLeod of MacLeod committed to his keeping his two sons, Sir Rory MacLeod and Sir Norman MacLeod.

He lived to a good old age, and was much regarded and respected by all his neighbours, who looked upon him as one of great prudence and bravery.

== Marriage and children ==
He was married to Florence, daughter to the Laird of MacLeod, and had the following children:

- John Garbh Maclean, 7th Laird of Coll, his successor
- Hector Maclean of the Isle of Muck
- Neil Maclean of Driranacross
- Catherine Maclean, married to John Maclean, Laird of MacKinnon
- Jannet Maclean, married to Farquhar Eraser, dean of the Isles
