= Sir Allan Maclean, 3rd Baronet =

Scottish clan chief

Sir Allan Maclean, 3rd Baronet and 19th Clan Chief

19th Clan Chief 15th Laird of Duart 3rd Baronet
- In office 1651-1674
- Preceded by: Sir Hector Maclean, 2nd Baronet, brother
- Succeeded by: Sir John Maclean, 4th Baronet, son

Personal details
- Born: Allan Maclean
- Children: Sir John Maclean, 4th Baronet
- Parent(s): Sir Lachlan Maclean, 1st Baronet; Juliana MacLeod of Macleod
- Relatives: Sir Hector Maclean, 2nd Baronet, brother

Sir Allan Maclean, 3rd Baronet of Morvern (1645–1674) was the 19th Clan Chief of Clan Maclean from 1651 to 1674. He married then had as his son: Sir John Maclean, 4th Baronet.

== Biography ==
He was born in 1645 and became chief at age six by the death of his brother Sir Hector Maclean, 2nd Baronet in 1651. Before reaching legal adulthood, the estates were managed by his legal guardians, both uncles: Donald Maclean, 1st Laird of Brolas and Hector MacLean of Lochbuy. The guardians paid off a portion of Duke of Argyle's claims; but the latter, learning that the late chief had contracted some debts in fitting out his clan for service during the late campaign, prevailed upon the creditors to dispose of their claims. Possessing himself of these debts, Argyle was enabled to augment his claims considerably; but finding, after the battle of Worcester, there was a likelihood of a pecuniary reward for those who adhered to Cromwell's government, left his persecution of the house of MacLean, to be pursued at some future time, and turned his attention to the prospective grant. Cromwell entered into negotiations with Argyle to bring about the submission of Scotland, and for a consideration of £12,000 the latter agreed to do all within his power for the subjection of his native country. This was one of the charges against him on his trial. He died in 1674.

== Ancestors ==
Sir Allan Maclean, 3rd Baronet's ancestors in three generations
Sir Allan Maclean, 3rd Baronet	Father: Sir Lachlan Maclean, 1st Baronet	Paternal Grandfather: Hector Mor Maclean	Paternal Great-Grandfather: Hector Og Maclean
Sir Allan Maclean, 3rd Baronet	Father: Sir Lachlan Maclean, 1st Baronet	Paternal Grandfather: Hector Mor Maclean	Paternal Great-grandmother: Janet Mackenzie of Kintail
Sir Allan Maclean, 3rd Baronet	Father: Sir Lachlan Maclean, 1st Baronet	Paternal Grandmother:	Paternal Great-Grandfather:
Sir Allan Maclean, 3rd Baronet	Father: Sir Lachlan Maclean, 1st Baronet	Paternal Grandmother:	Paternal Great-Grandmother:
Sir Allan Maclean, 3rd Baronet	Mother: Mary MacLeod	Maternal Grandfather: Sir Roderick MacLeod	Maternal Great-Grandfather:
Sir Allan Maclean, 3rd Baronet	Mother: Mary MacLeod	Maternal Grandfather: Sir Roderick MacLeod	Maternal Great-Grandmother:
Sir Allan Maclean, 3rd Baronet	Mother: Mary MacLeod	Maternal Grandmother:	Maternal Great-grandfather:
Sir Allan Maclean, 3rd Baronet	Mother: Mary MacLeod	Maternal Grandmother:	Maternal Great-Grandmother:

Baronetage of Nova Scotia
Preceded by Hector Maclean	Baronet (of Duart and Morvern); 1651–1674	Succeeded by John Maclean
