= Hector Og Maclean =

Hector Og Maclean, or Eachann Óg Maclean in Gaelic may refer to:

- Hector Og Maclean, 13th Chief (c. 1540-1573), 13th Chief of Clan MacLean in Scotland
- Sir Hector Og Maclean, 15th Chief (1583–1623), 15th Clan Chief of Clan Maclean in Scotland and 5th Laird of Dowart
- Hector Og Maclean of Brolas, son of Donald Maclean, 1st Laird of Brolas
