= Hector Mor Maclean =

Hector Mor Maclean, or Eachann Mor Maclean in Scottish Gaelic, may refer to:

- Hector Mor Maclean, 12th Chief, (died 1568), Chief of Clan MacLean
- Hector Mor Maclean, 16th Chief, (circa 1600–1626), Chief of Clan MacLean
