= Sir Lachlan Mackinnon (clan chief) =

Scottish clan chief (died c. 1634)

Sir Lachlan Mackinnon (died c.1634) was chief of the Scottish Highland clan Mackinnon and played a prominent part in the troubled and transitional politics of the West Highlands in the early 17th century.

== Origins ==
Mackinnon was the son and heir of Lachlan Og (“Young Lachlan”) Mackinnon and grandson of Lachlan Dhu (“Black Haired Lachlan”) Mackinnon, who were both in their turn chiefs of their clan. The Mackinnons were an independent, though never very numerous family. MS 1467, an early manuscript source, suggests that they shared a common ancestry with the clans MacQuarrie, MacMillan and MacLennan. Their chiefs were for several hundred years possessed of substantial estates at Mishnish, in the north of the Isle of Mull, and Strathaird, in the Isle of Skye.

== Clan feuds ==
In the great feud between the clans Maclean and Macdonald in the latter years of the 16th century (which degenerated at times into general warfare involving numerous other clans), the Mackinnons were supporters of the former. A temporary settlement was brokered with royal approval in 1587, following the capture of Sir Lachlan Mor Maclean by Angus Macdonald of Dunnyveg. Macdonald agreed to release Maclean in exchange for a pardon and upon the surrender to him of eight hostages of rank to act as his sureties. Lachlan Mackinnon and his brother Neil were two of the eight hostages, the others being Hector Maclean (Sir Lachlan Maclean's eldest son), Alexander Macleod (brother of William Macleod of Dunvegan), John and Murdo MacNeil (sons of Ruari Macneil of Barra), Allan Maclean (son of Ewan Maclean of Ardgour) and Donald Maclean (son of Hector Maclean, constable of Cairnburgh Castle).

Soon after his release, and apparently undeterred by any concern for the fate of his hostages, Sir Lachlan Maclean invaded Islay during Angus Macdonald's absence in Ireland. Macdonald “disdained to punish the hostages” and himself mounted a retaliatory invasion of Mull and Tiree. The Privy Council ordered Macdonald to surrender his hostages into royal custody. When Macdonald failed to do so, he himself was outlawed and Maclean was received (at least temporarily) back into favour. A further settlement was imposed following a trial of Macdonald and Maclean in 1591.

Lachlan succeeded his father in about 1600 and shortly afterwards, on 8 January 1601 entered into a bond of friendship with Archibald Campbell, 7th Earl of Argyll.

== Regulatory reform ==
In an (often ineffectual) attempt to exercise a degree of control over the Highland chiefs, the Privy Council would require their regular attendance in Edinburgh. On 25 February 1606, Lachlan made the first of several such recorded appearances and undertook in the future, under a penalty of 10,000 merks, to attend personally before the Council within 60 days of the Council's summons. On 12 July 1606, Lachlan entered into a bond of manrent with Finlay MacNab of Bowaine. On 12 May 1609, he appeared again before the Privy Council, pursuant to a summons issued on 6 February 1609.

In 1609, Lachlan was also one of twelve leading men of the Highlands who submitted formally to the Bishop of the Isles (Andrew Knox) in Iona and (in August) entered into a bond to observe the Statutes of Icolmkill, a regulatory reform which Donald Gregory described as “of the utmost importance for the improvement of the Isles”. His eleven co-signatories were Angus Macdonald of Dunnyveg, Hector Og Maclean of Duart, Donald Gorm Macdonald of Sleat, Ruari Macleod of Harris, Donald Macdonald (the Captain of Clanranald), Lachlan Maclean of Coll, Hector Maclaine of Lochbuie, Lachlan and Allan Maclean (the brothers of Duart), Gillespie MacQuarrie of Ulva and Donald Macfie of Colonsay.

On 28 June 1610 he was one of seven chiefs (the others being Maclean of Duart, Macdonald of Sleat, Macdonald of Dunnyveg, Macleod of Harris, the Captain of Clanranald and Allan Cameron of Lochiel) who appeared in Edinburgh and were required to promise to live together in peace, love and amitie and to assist the Commissioners to quell disturbances, as well as to give large sureties for their reappearance before the Council in May 1611.

Lachlan was knighted in 1613 and appeared again before the Council on 3 August 1614. On 26 April 1615 he was appointed under a commission of fire and sword to act against the Macdonalds of Kintyre and Islay. Two months later he was appointed with Maclean of Duart, Maclaine of Lochbuie and Maclean of Coll to protect the country between Ardnamuchan and Lorne against the Macdonalds. Later that year the King ordered that he should be provided with 200 men for the defence of his castles.

In 1616, Lachlan was one of six leading islanders (the others being Macleod of Harris, the Captain of Clanranald, Maclean of Duart, Maclean of Coll and Maclaine of Lochbuie) who were required by the Privy Council to stand surety for themselves and each other to comply with a further list of regulations. Among his obligations, he was compelled annually to exhibit to the Council one of his principal kinsmen, was not permitted to maintain more than three gentlemen in his household, was required to keep his residence at Kilmorie in Skye, and was restricted to keeping a single birlinn (or galley); his annual household consumption of wine was also limited to a single tun. Although he was (like the other chiefs) obliged to answer for the good conduct of his clan, Lachlan named five unruly Mackinnons for whom he was not willing to be held responsible.

== Later life ==
On 24 August 1616 Lachlan entered into a bond of friendship at Glasgow with Ruari Macleod of Harris, Donald, the Captain of Clanranald and Maclean of Coll.

In 1622 he was denounced at the horn for allegedly ravishing Mary, sister of Donald Macdonald of Sleat and wife of Ronald McConneil of Castle Torrin in Uist but it seems unlikely that the allegations were pursued, for no action appears to have been taken against him when he appeared personally before the Council on 23 July 1623.

In 1626 the Lords of “Secret Council” gave Lachlan a commission to search and take all Jesuits who might resort to his bounds. A similar task was imposed on his nephew Neil Mackinnon, when he was appointed the following year as minister of Strath.

On 15 January 1628, Lachlan's estate of Strath was erected into a Barony by Charles I in his favour, and he died not long afterwards, being succeeded by his eldest son John Balbhan (“John the Dumb”), who married a daughter of Maclean of Coll.
