= Sir Hector Maclean =

Sir Hector Maclean may refer to:

- Sir Hector Maclean, 2nd Baronet (c.1620–1651), 18th Clan Chief of Clan Maclean
- Sir Hector Maclean, 5th Baronet (c.1700–1750/1751), 21st Clan Chief of Clan Maclean
- Sir Hector Maclean, 7th Baronet (1783–1818), 23rd Clan Chief of Clan Maclean

== See also ==
- Hector Maclean (disambiguation)
