= Tarbert (Parliament of Scotland constituency) =

Tarbertshire or the sheriffdom of Tarbert was a constituency in the Parliament of Scotland.

On 28 June 1633 King Charles I, with the consent of the Three Estates, united the sheriffdom of Tarbert with the sheriffdom of Argyll. The last commissioner for Tarbert in the Parliament was Sir Lachlan Maclean of Morvern, who sat from 1628 to 1633.
