= 15th clan chief =

15th clan chief may refer to:

- Sir Roderick Macleod of Macleod, 15th Chief
- Sir Hector Og Maclean, 15th Chief
- Alexander Ranaldson MacDonell of Glengarry
