= Hector Roy Maclean =

Hector Roy Maclean may refer to:

- Hector Roy Maclean, 5th Laird of Coll
- Red Hector of the Battles Maclean, also known as Hector Roy Maclean

== See also ==
- Hector MacLean (disambiguation)
