= Battle of Benbigrie =

1598 battle

- Part of the Scottish clan battles
- The Battle of Benbigrie took place on the Isle of Islay (marked in green)
Date	1598
Location	Islay, Scotland
Result	Maclean victory

Belligerents
Clan Maclean	Clan MacDonald of Dunnyveg

Commanders and leaders
Chief Hector	Chief James

The Battle of Benbigrie took place on Isle of Islay in 1598 between the forces of Hector Og Maclean, 15th Chief and Sir James MacDonald, 9th of Dunnyveg.

== Background ==
At the Battle of Traigh Ghruinneart on the Isle of Islay in 1598, Sir James MacDonald, 9th of Dunnyveg led forces against Sir Lachlan Mor MacLean, 14th Chief of Duart. James was wounded in battle but his forces killed MacLean.

Hector Og Maclean, 15th Chief sought revenge for the death of his father and the hostile parties met at a place called Benbigrie, and as neither felt disposed to offer nor to accept terms, the result was an immediate battle. The followers of the chief of MacLean, upon this occasion, considerably outnumbered the MacDonalds; but Sir James, aware that he need hope for no reconciliation with his enraged kinsman, told his followers that in a resolute resistance alone existed any hope of safety to themselves or of protection to their homes. The MacDonalds, goaded to desperation by a knowledge of these facts, fought with uncontrollable fury, and it was not until the heights of Benbigrie were covered with their slain, and their chief carried off the field dangerously wounded, that their assailants succeeded in routing them. Defeated Macdonald then fled to Spain.
