= Lachlan Mackinnon (disambiguation) =

Lachlan (or Lauchlan) Mackinnon (or MacKinnon or McKinnon) may refer to:

- Sir Lachlan Mackinnon (clan chief) (died c.1634), chief of the Scottish Highland clan Mackinnon
- Lauchlan Bellingham Mackinnon (1814–1877), Member of Parliament for Rye, Sussex, England
- Lauchlan Mackinnon (1817–1888), Australian pastoralist, politician and newspaper proprietor
- Lauchlan K. S. Mackinnon (1861–1935), Australian racing official, namesake of LKS MacKinnon Stakes
- Lachlan Donald Ian Mackinnon (1882–1948), Royal Navy officer
- Lachlan Mackinnon (born 1956), Scottish poet, critic and literary journalist
