= Sheriff of Tarbert =

The Sheriff of Tarbert was the sheriff principal of Tarbertshire. The position continued in existence until 1633, when it was amalgamated into the position of the Sheriff of Argyll.

== Past sheriffs ==
=== 16th century ===
- William Hardy 1553
