= Neil MacKinnon =

British minister

Neil MacKinnon was the first Protestant minister on the island of Skye, being for many years in the 17th century the Episcopalian minister of first Strath and subsequently Sleat.

== Origins and education ==
MacKinnon was the eldest son of John Og MacKinnon, probably to be identified as the brother of Sir Lachlan MacKinnon of Strath. Clan traditions relate that his life was in danger as a child and that he spent some time in hiding in a cave, known ever since as Slochd Altrimen ("the Nursing Cave"). He graduated with an M.A. from the University of Glasgow in 1626.

== Ministry ==
In 1627 MacKinnon was appointed to Cill Chriosd (or Kilchrist), the parish church of Strath. On his appointment he "gave his grite and solemn oathe that he sall treulis, according to his knowledge, give up to the Clerk of Counsell the names of all the Papists whom he knew within the Ilis". By 4 August 1633, when he entered into a contract to foster Iain Breac Macleod of Dunvegan, he had been translated to the parish of Sleat, in which he was confirmed in 1661. He was noted for preaching in full Highland dress "and from the distracted state of the times never went to the pulpit without being fully armed".

MacKinnon is described in the records of the Synod of Argyll as "a man able in the Gaelic language". In October 1651, the Synod appointed him "twelve bolls victual out of the vacancies of Kintyre", partly as an acknowledgment of his work in translating the Shorter Catechism into Gaelic, and partly on account of "his great necessitie and penurie".

== Family and descendants ==
MacKinnon married Janet Macleod of Drynoch. They had five sons, including Donald, who served for a period from 1675 as minister of the united parishes of Strath and Sleat.
