= Hector Mor Maclean, 16th Chief =

Hector Mor MacLean, 16th Clan Chief

16th Clan Chief 12th Laird of Duart
- In office 1623–1626 (3 years)
- Preceded by: Hector Og Maclean, 15th Clan Chief, father
- Succeeded by: Sir Lachlan Maclean, 17th Chief and 1st Baronet, brother

Personal details
- Born: Hector Mor MacLean circa 1600
- Died: 1626
- Spouse(s): Margaret MacLeod, eldest daughter of Sir Roderick MacLeod
- Parent(s): Sir Hector Og Maclean, 15th Clan Chief; Janet Mackenzie of Kintail
- Relatives: Sir Lachlan Maclean, 1st Baronet 17th Clan Chief, brother Donald MacLean, 1st Laird of Brolas, brother John Hans Makeléer, brother

Hector Mor Maclean of Dowart (circa 1600–1626), or Eachann Mór Maclean in Scottish Gaelic, known as Hector the Great, was the 16th Clan Chief of Clan MacLean from 1623 until his death in 1626. The term Mór or Mor translates to great when added to a name in Scottish Gaelic. He resided at Duart Castle on the Isle of Mull. Notably, he was the first Chief of MacLean in four hundred years to not produce an heir, breaking the direct male line from Gillean of the Battle Axe, the clan's founder. He was succeeded by his younger brother, Lachlan Maclean, 1st Baronet.

== Biography ==
He was the first son of Hector Og Maclean, 15th Clan Chief and Janet MacKenzie of Kintail, the daughter of Colin Mackenzie of Kintail. Hector became Clan Chief at the death of his father in 1623.

Hector Mor was married to Margaret Macleod, eldest daughter of Sir Roderick Macleod of Macleod, 15th Chief, and he died without having any children in 1626. He was succeeded by his younger brother, Lachlan Maclean, 1st Baronet. His widow married Eneas MacDonnell, 7th of Glengarry.

== Ancestors ==
Hector Mor Maclean's ancestors in three generations
Hector Mor Maclean	Father: Hector Og Maclean	Paternal Grandfather: Sir Lachlan Mor Maclean	Paternal Great-Grandfather: Eachuinn Og Maclean
Hector Mor Maclean	Father: Hector Og Maclean	Paternal Grandfather: Sir Lachlan Mor Maclean	Paternal Great-grandmother:
Hector Mor Maclean	Father: Hector Og Maclean	Paternal Grandmother: Margaret Cunningham of Glencairn	Paternal Great-Grandfather: William Cunningham, 6th Earl of Glencairn
Hector Mor Maclean	Father: Hector Og Maclean	Paternal Grandmother: Margaret Cunningham of Glencairn	Paternal Great-Grandmother:
Hector Mor Maclean	Mother: Janet MacKenzie of Kintail	Maternal Grandfather: Colin Mackenzie of Kintail	Maternal Great-Grandfather: Kenneth Mackenzie of Kintail
Hector Mor Maclean	Mother: Janet MacKenzie of Kintail	Maternal Grandfather: Colin Mackenzie of Kintail	Maternal Great-Grandmother: Lady Elizabeth Stewart
Hector Mor Maclean	Mother: Janet MacKenzie of Kintail	Maternal Grandmother: Barbara Grant	Maternal Great-grandfather: John Grant of Grant
Hector Mor Maclean	Mother: Janet MacKenzie of Kintail	Maternal Grandmother: Barbara Grant	Maternal Great-Grandmother: Lady Marjory Stewart
