= Sir Hector Maclean, 2nd Baronet =

Scottish clan chief

Sir Hector Maclean, 2nd Baronet and 18th Clan Chief

18th Clan Chief 14th Laird of Duart 2nd Baronet
- In office 1649-1651
- Preceded by: Sir Lachlan Maclean, 1st Baronet, father
- Succeeded by: Sir Allan Maclean, 3rd Baronet, brother

Personal details
- Born: Hector Maclean circa 1620
- Died: 1651
- Parent(s): Sir Lachlan Maclean, 1st Baronet; Mary, second daughter of Sir Roderick MacLeod
- Relatives: Sir Allan Maclean, 3rd Baronet, brother

Sir Hector Maclean, 2nd Baronet of Morvern (c. 1620 – 20 July 1651) was the 18th Clan Chief of Clan Maclean from 1649 to 1651. He died without leaving a son as an heir.

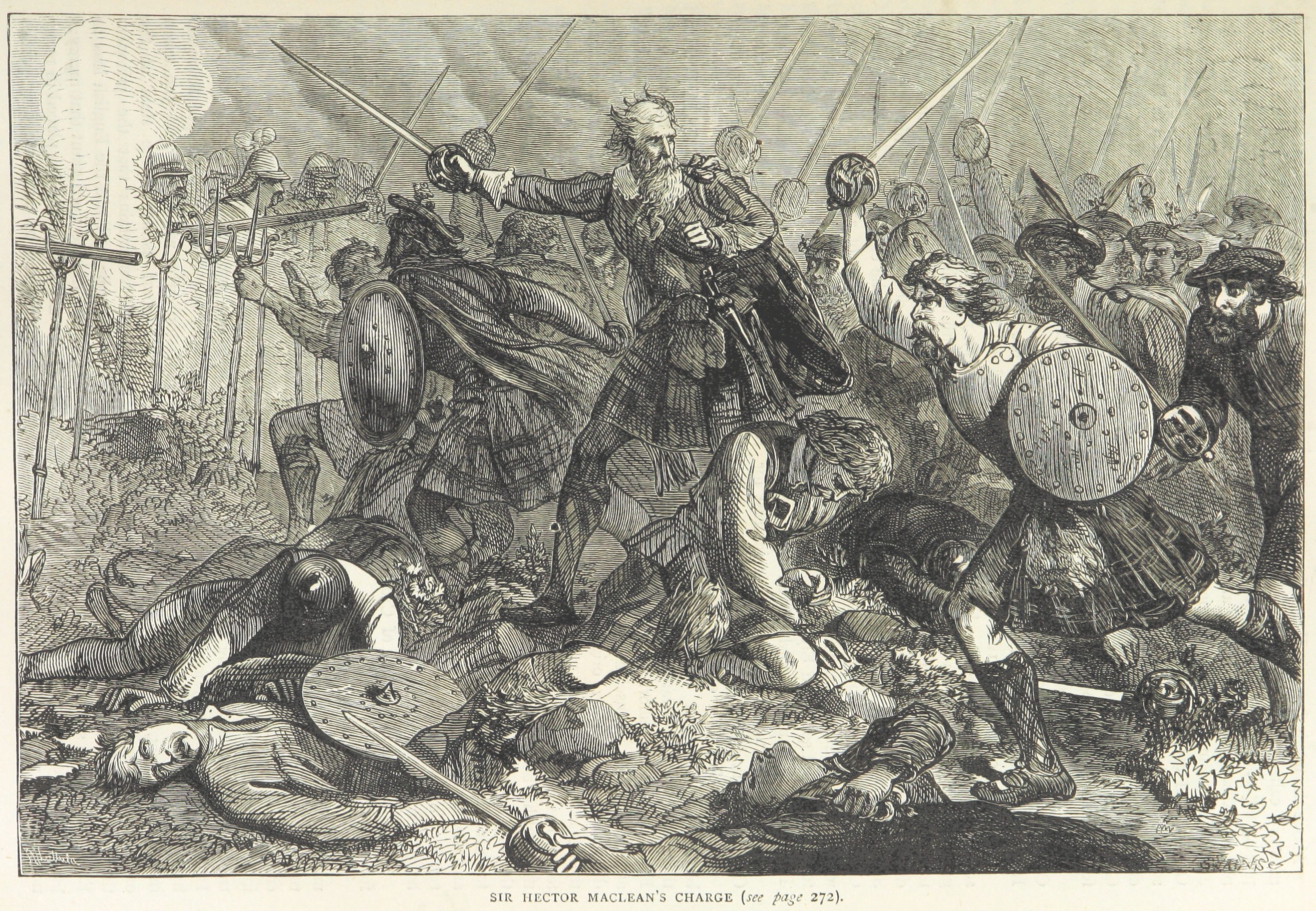
Sir Hector MacLean's charge at the Battle of Inverkeithing (1873 illustration)

== Biography ==
Hector was the son of Sir Lachlan Maclean, 1st Baronet and succeeded him at his death in 1649. His mother was Mary MacLeod, the second daughter of Sir Roderick MacLeod. At Hector's death in 1651, he was succeeded as Clan Maclean Chief by his brother, Sir Allan Maclean, 3rd Baronet.

Hector was killed fighting for Scotland at the battle of Inverkeithing. It was during this battle that seven brothers died protecting their Clan chief. Each brother crying "Another for Hector" as they stepped forward to protect him. Fear eile airson Eachuinn (from Scottish Gaelic: "Another for Hector") became one of the two slogans used by Clan Maclean.

== Ancestors ==
Sir Hector Maclean, 2nd Baronet's ancestors in three generations
Sir Hector Maclean, 2nd Baronet	Father: Sir Lachlan Maclean, 1st Baronet	Paternal Grandfather: Hector Mor Maclean	Paternal Great-Grandfather: Hector Og Maclean
Sir Hector Maclean, 2nd Baronet	Father: Sir Lachlan Maclean, 1st Baronet	Paternal Grandfather: Hector Mor Maclean	Paternal Great-grandmother: Janet Mackenzie of Kintail
Sir Hector Maclean, 2nd Baronet	Father: Sir Lachlan Maclean, 1st Baronet	Paternal Grandmother: Margaret MacLeod	Paternal Great-Grandfather: Sir Roderick MacLeod
Sir Hector Maclean, 2nd Baronet	Father: Sir Lachlan Maclean, 1st Baronet	Paternal Grandmother: Margaret MacLeod	Paternal Great-Grandmother:
Sir Hector Maclean, 2nd Baronet	Mother: Mary MacLeod	Maternal Grandfather: Sir Roderick MacLeod	Maternal Great-Grandfather:
Sir Hector Maclean, 2nd Baronet	Mother: Mary MacLeod	Maternal Grandfather: Sir Roderick MacLeod	Maternal Great-Grandmother:
Sir Hector Maclean, 2nd Baronet	Mother: Mary MacLeod	Maternal Grandmother:	Maternal Great-grandfather:
Sir Hector Maclean, 2nd Baronet	Mother: Mary MacLeod	Maternal Grandmother:	Maternal Great-Grandmother:

== Notes ==
This article incorporates text from A history of the clan Mac Lean from its first settlement at Duard Castle, in the Isle of Mull, to the present period: including a genealogical account of some of the principal families together with their heraldry, legends, superstitions, etc, by John Patterson MacLean, a publication from 1889, now in the public domain in the United States.

Baronetage of Nova Scotia
Preceded by Lachlan Maclean	Baronet (of Duart and Morvern); 1649–1651	Succeeded by Allan Maclean
