= Manrent =

Former Scottish contract of loyalty

Manrent refers to a Scottish contract of the mid-15th century to the early 17th century, usually military in nature and involving Scottish clans. The bond of manrent was commonly an instrument in which a weaker man or clan pledged to serve, in return for protection, a stronger lord or clan—in effect becoming a vassal that renders service to a superior, often made in the form of a covenant. Manrents were a Promise by one person to serve another, [such] that he shall be friend to all his friends, and foe to all his foes.

Some bonds of manrent, described as bonds of friendship, took place between men or clans of equal power, worded in the form of treaties of offensive and defensive alliance. These contracting parties bound themselves to assist each other. Manrents always acknowledged and prioritized the signatory's duty of allegiance to the King, in terms such as: "…always excepting duty to our lord the king". In the same manner, when men who were not chiefs of clans, but of subordinate tribes, thus bound themselves, their fidelity to their chiefs was always excepted, in terms such as "…always excepting duty to our kindred and friends".

Smaller clans, unable to defend themselves, and clans or families who had lost their chiefs, frequently entered into manrent. Under such treaties, smaller clans identified themselves with the greater clans. They engaged in the quarrels, followed the fortunes, and fought under the greater chiefs. However, their ranks were separately marshaled, and led by their own subordinate chiefs, chieftains, lairds or captains, who owed submission only when necessary, for the success of combined operations. Although manrents often used terms such as, "our successors", "perpetually", and "in all time coming", their object was usually defense, aggression, or revenge, rarely extending further than the occasion for which they were formed.

== Background ==
Bonds of manrent played an important part in Scottish clan relationships from the 15th to the early 17th century. Disputes between opposing clans were frequently made matters of negotiation, with differences often settled by treaties. To strengthen a clan against a rival, or to maintain the balance of power in a region, a clan could join a coalition with friendly neighbours. Manrents protected smaller clans from being swallowed up by larger ones, and nursed the turbulent and warlike spirit that formed the common distinction of all. From these and other causes, the Highlands were, for ages, as constant a theater of petty conflicts that paralleled larger ones in Europe. The circumstances that led to manrents show that the Scottish government of the time was too weak to protect the oppressed or quell disputes between clans.

== Manrents and Scots Law ==
Manrents were abolished by Act of Parliament, Edinburgh, under legislation on 6 March 1457 "that no man dwelling within burgh be found in manrent", and under the same terms, by legislation on 18 May 1491. The penalty being the confiscation of goods and "thar lifis at the kingis will". However, the terms of this legislation allowed for Manrents to the King, to the King's officers, to the Lord of the same burgh as the man entering into manrent, and to their superior officer.

In Chapter 17 of legislation on 20 June 1555, and for reasons "because it is thocht aganis all law and obedience of subjectis towart thair princis", the giving and taking of bonds of manrent made in the past were now null and void, an exception was made for heritable bonds given for "assythment of slaughters in time bygone".

Manrents mentioned in Parliamentary procedure and legislation:

- Under parliamentary procedure of 11 December 1543, Sir James Hamilton, was bound into a bond of manrent for himself and his heirs to James Hamilton, Earl of Arran and his heirs, in return for a bond of maintenance.
- A "Ratification of a bond of manrent to [James Weir], laird of Blackwood" was passed in legislation 5 June 1592, "for the assythment and satisfactioun of the slauchter of umquhile Johnne Weir of Poneill".

The following cases involving bonds of manrent were brought before the Judicial proceedings: acts of the lords auditors of causes and complaints:

- 4 July 1476, Gavin of Crichton against Sir William of Borthwick, knight
- 20 July 1476, Alexander Cunningham, Lord Kilmaurs, against Robert of Muir of Rowallan
- 9 December 1482, John the Bruce of the Stenhouse against Robert Fleming, Lord Fleming and Andrew Oliphant, his bailie
- 19 May 1491, Cuthbert of Murray of Cockpool against Robert of Carlyle

== Terminology ==
The earliest known bond to use the term "manrent" was recorded in January 1442, between Alexander MacDonald, earl of Ross and Hugh Fraser of Lovat. Earlier contracts survive, but use terms such as "letters of retinue" or "rentinencia".

== Illustrative example of a manrent ==
In 1588, William Macleod of Macleod, 13th chief of Clan Macleod, entered into a bond of manrent with Lachlan Mackintosh of Mackintosh, Captain and Chief of the Clan Chattan, whose daughter he had married, in the following terms (text taken from public domain):-

"Be it kenned to all, me, William Macleod of Dunvegan,

to become bound and obliged. Like as by the tenor hereof, I bind and oblige me, my heirs, leally and truly, by the faith and truth in my body, to take, efauld, and true part, assist, maintain, and defend, and concur with Lachlan Mackintosh of Dunachton, Captain and Chief of the Clan Chattan, and his heirs, in all and sundrie their actions, causes, quarrels, debates, and invasion of any person or persons whatever, indirectly used or intended contrary to the said Lachlan and his heirs in all time coming, from the day and date hereof, so that I, the said William Macleod, and my heirs, shall be sufficiently and duly premonished and advertised by the said Lachlan Mackintosh and his foresaids, to the effect foresaid, and shall give faithful and true counsel to him and his heirs, by and attour concurrence, and take efauld part with him and his heirs (as said is) in all their just causes and actions as said is. And sicklike I shall not hide, obscure, nor conceal, by any colour or engine, directly or indirectly, any skaith, displeasure, nor harm, meant or concert, in contrar the said Lachlan Mackintosh and his foresaids by any whatsomever person or persons, the same coming to the knowledge and ears of me, the said William Macleod and my heirs, but immediately after trial thereof in all our best manner, with all expedition and haste, shall advertise, report, and make foreseen the said Lachlan Mackintosh and his heirs thereof. As also to concur, assist, maintain, defend, and take faithful part with them against all mortals (the King's Majesty excepted allenarly). And this my bond to stand firm and stable in all time coming after the day and date hereof. In witness of the whilk, I have subscribed these presents with my hand, in manner under written, at Culloden, the 15th day of January, 1588, before witness."

(Signed) WILLIAM M'LEOYD offe Dunvegane.

== List of manrents (currently incomplete) ==
Between	Date	Notes and Reference
Clan Forbes Clan Ogston	1430	10 May 1430; for Alexander Ogston of that Ilk, son and heir of Thomas of Ogistun lord of that Ilk, to "attend him [Sir Alexander Forbes of that Ilk] with three armed horsemen against all mortals, the King excepted"; with a clause that the number of horsemen be increased to six upon Thomas of Ogistun's death: "...sall serff wt. III hors qwyll my ffader lyffis & efter hym wt. sex"
Clan Macdonald Clan Fraser	1442	recorded in January 1442. The earliest known bond to use the term "manrent". Between Alexander MacDonald, earl of Ross and Hugh Fraser of Lovat.
Clan Gordon Clan Forbes	1444	"Bond of Manrent of James of Forbes, sone and ayer apperande of Schir Alexander of Forbes knycht" to "lorde Alexander of Setoune of Gordon".
Clan Brodie Clan Mackenzie	1466	bond of manrent made in gratitude and friendship for the assistance of Clan Brodie against Clan Macdonald at the battle of Blar-na-pairc.
Clan MacLea Clan Campbell of Cawdor	1518	"clane McDowleanis" (an error for M'Donvleavis or MacLea) gave their bond of manrent to Sir John Campbell of Caldor (Cawdor).
Clan Campbell Clan MacDonell of Glengarry	1519	"Allastyr Mac Ean Vic Allyster of Morvern and Glengarrie", in a bond of manrent to Colin, Earl of Argyll, the King's Lieutenant at the time over the district in which Glengarry's property lay, dated 5 February 1519, with a Notarial Instrument thereon, dated 8 August in the same year.
Clan Gordon Clan MacKay	1522	Alexander Gordon (the Earl of Sutherland's eldest son) overthrew John Mackay of Strathnaver at Lairg, and forced him to submit himself to the Earl of Sutherland; unto whom John Mackay gave his band of manrent and service, dated "the year of God 1522".
Clan Montgomery Clan MacFarlane	1545	granted to Hugh, Master of Eglinton, in 1545 by Duncan, uncle to the Laird of MacFarlane at Irwine
Clan Gordon Clan Mackenzie	1545	13 December 1545, at Dingwall, the Earl of Sutherland entered into a bond of manrent with John Mackenzie of Kintail for mutual defence against all enemies, reserving only their allegiance to the youthful Mary, Queen of Scots
Clan Gordon Clan MacLean, Clan MacDonald of Keppoch, and others	1547	Hector MacLean, then of Duart, with Keppoch and others, signed a bond of Manrent "vitht my hand at the pen", to George, Earl of Huntly, at the castle of that name.
Clan Campbell Clan Macleod,	1559	At Dunoon, 1 March 1559, "betwixt a noble and potent Lord Archibald, Earl of Argyll, on the one part, and Tormod Macleod, son to [umquhile] Alexander Macleod of the Harris, as principal in this contract, and Hector Maclean of Duart as principal favourer and tutor to the said Tormod, on the other part"..."the said Tormod, by these presents, gives and grants his bond of manrent, his faithful and true service, with all his kin and friends, and his heirs and successors of the Harris, to the said Earl, his heirs and successors, of Argyll, perpetually; also shall not marry but with the advice of the said Earl, whose counsel he shall take in marrying a wife"
Clan Grant Clan MacDonell of Glengarry,	1571	Contract between Angus MacAlester of Glengarry and Clan Grant. Glengarry, in this bond of manrent, which he agreed to give, makes an exception in favour "of ye auctoritie of our soverane and his Chief of Clanranald only ". This is held by Clanranald of Moydart as an acknowledgment by Glengarry of the Captain of Clanranald as his chief.
Clan Mackintosh Clan Macleod	1588	see illustrative example above
Clan Gordon Clan Macpherson	1591	signed at Huntly Castle, "leallie, faithfullie, and to serve in all action and wars against quhatsumever", to George, Earl of Huntly by Andrew MacPherson of Cluny, John MacPherson in Brakaucht, James and Paul MacPherson, and others
Clan MacGregor Clan MacAulay	1591	entered into between MacGregor of Glenstrae and MacAulay of Ardincaple, of date 27 May 1591, the latter acknowledges his being a cadet of the former, and agrees to pay him the "calp," that is, a tribute of cattle given in acknowledgment of superiority.
Clan MacNab Clan Mackinnon	1606	dated 12 July 1606, between Lauchlan MacKinnon of Strathairdle and Finlay Macnab of Bowaine, In the bond the two chiefs claimed to "come from ane house and one lineage", and promised to lend aid to each other
Clan Chattan Clan Macqueen	1609	On 4 April 1609, Donald Macqueen of Corrybrough signed the bond of manrent, with the chiefs of the other tribes composing the Clan Chattan, whereby they bound themselves to support Angus Mackintosh of that ilk as their captain and leader
Clan MacGregor Clan Mackinnon	1671	dated at Kilniorio in 1671, between Lauchlan Mackinnon of Strathairdle and James Macgregor of Macgregor, "for the special love and amitie between these persons, and condescending that they are descended lawfully fra twa breethren of auld descent, wherefore and for certain onerous causes moving we witt ye to be bound and obleisit, likcas by the tenor hereof we faithfully bind and obleiso us and our successors, our kin, friends, and followers, faithfully to serve one anither in all causes with our men and servants, against all who live or die."
Clan Campbell Clan MacDonald of Keppoch	1681	found in the Black-book of Taymouth that a bond of manrent was given by Gilleasba, chief of Keppoch, to John Glas, first Earl of Breadalbane; "such as Ceppoch's predecessors gave to the Earl's predecessors". binding Keppoch "to restrain all the inhabitants of Brae-Lochaber, and all of the name of Macdonell, from committing robberies within the Earl's bounds".
Brim-DeForest of Balvaird Clan MacPherson	2021	17 May 2021; in the collection of the Clan Macpherson Museum, a bond of manrent from Brady Brim-DeForest of Balvaird Castle, “in true bond of mutual assistance and loyal service to James Brodie Macpherson of Cluny and Blairgowrie, Chief of Clan Macpherson”;

== See also ==
- Coalition
- Covenant (law)
- Homage (medieval)
- Scottish clan
- Treaty
