= Tarbertshire =

Shire of Scotland until 1633

Coordinates: 55.8°N 5.8°W

Tarbertshire, or the sheriffdom of Tarbert, was a shire of Scotland until 1633, when it was annexed to Argyll. It comprised the mainland peninsula formed by Knapdale and Kintyre, together with the southern Inner Hebrides to the west.

== History ==
It has been suggested that Robert the Bruce, who extended Tarbert Castle, created or intended a sheriffdom there; however, the first reference to Tarbertshire is in 1481, when Knapdale (back then including the lands between Loch Awe and Loch Fyne) was transferred to it from Perthshire. The shire town was Tarbert, but the sheriff court was latterly at Inveraray in Argyllshire. The Earl of Argyll family of Campbells often supplied the Sheriff of Tarbert and other officials of both Argyll and Tarbert.

Although shires elected commissioners to the Parliament of Scotland from 1590, it was not until the 1628–33 Parliament of Charles I that Tarbert is known to have sent one: Sir Lachlan Maclean of Morvern. Since this was the Parliament that abolished Tarbertshire, Maclean was its last commissioner. (In the 1630 session roll, Sir Coll Lamont, laird of Lamont, is said to represent "Argyll and Tarbert".)
