= Religion of the Yellow Stick =

Perjoritive name for the Presbyterian Church of Scotland in the Hebrides

The religion of the yellow stick (Scottish Gaelic: Creideamh a’ bhata-bhuidhe) was a facetious name given to the enforcement of the Church of Scotland among certain Catholic churchgoers who lived in the Hebrides of Scotland. Such actions, however, were not unique to the Hebrides, but occurred in other parts of Scotland.

A Coll priest of former times was accustomed to drive recalcitrant natives to church by a smart application of his walking stick; those who yielded were thus said to come under Creideamh a’ bhata-bhuidhe.

Another version says that Hector (Scottish Gaelic: Eachann) the son of Lachlan MacLean of Coll, was the one who applied the yellow stick. Hector was laird of Muck in 1715, and the religion of the yellow stick was introduced into Rùm in 1726. Samuel Johnson, on his famous journey round the Hebrides (1775) encountered the story; in Rùm he said that there were

fifty-eight families, who continued Papists for some time after the Laird became a Protestant. Their adherence to their old religion was strengthened by the countenance of the Laird’s sister, a zealous Romanist, till one Sunday, as they were going to mass under the conduct of their patroness, MacLean met them on the way, gave one of them a blow on the head with a yellow stick, I suppose a cane, for which the Erse had no name, and drove them to the kirk, from which they have never since departed. Since the use of this method of conversion, the inhabitants of Egg [sic] and Canna, who continue Papists, call the Protestantism of Rùm, the Religion of the Yellow Stick.

David Livingstone, whose ancestors came from Ulva near the Mull and Staffa, said:

Our ancestors were Roman Catholics; they were made Protestants by the laird coming round with a man having a yellow staff, which would seem to have attracted more attention than his teaching, for the new religion went long afterward, perhaps it does so still, by the name of the religion of the yellow stick.

The "yellow stick" in Livingstone's description may be a reference to the Bishop of Lismore's crozier or baculum, in Gaelic the "Bachuil Mor" or staff of Saint Moluag, the patron saint of the Clan MacLea or Livingstone.

== See also ==
- Rice Christian
