= Rice Christian =

Slur against Indian Christians

Rice Christian or Ricebag is a slur directed at Indian Christians implying that the recipient of the insult converted to Christianity due to monetary gain. It is mostly used by the Hindutva movement in India.

== History ==
One of the earliest examples of this concept in English appeared in 1689 with the writings of William Dampier when he wrote regarding the French priests' effort to convert people of Tonkin that "alms of rice have converted more than their preaching."

In China, the European powers extracted privileges for themselves and for foreign missionaries in the unequal treaties that followed the Opium Wars. Principles of extraterritoriality applied the foreigners in China, and the French religious protectorate in China developed a role in intervening in disputes on behalf of Catholic missionaries and Chinese Catholics. The ability to intervene in court cases pursuant to treaty rights made the Catholic Church a new source of power in local Chinese society. It obtained support from people living at the margins of Chinese society and groups seeking allies in local conflicts. Chinese who converted to Catholicism to obtain protection were sometimes called rice Christians, litigation Christians, or feud Christians.

This term and the topic were very extensively written about by Thomas Hale, Jr. He introduced the topic in his first 1986 book Don't Let the Goats Eat the Loquat Trees and spoke and taught on best practices in missions summarizing his work in his 1995 book On Being a Missionary. The term has also been used pejoratively to describe conversions by missionaries who exploit poverty and famine, where food and other allurements are given in exchange for conversion. In Christian Witness in a Multi-Religious World: Recommendations for Conduct, a document issued by the World Council of Churches in 2011, one of the points raised states "If Christians engage in inappropriate methods of exercising mission by resorting to deception and coercive means, they betray the gospel and may cause suffering to others." Principles 4 and 5 of this document outline that "Acts of service, such as providing education, health care, relief services and acts of justice and advocacy are an integral part of witnessing to the gospel. The exploitation of situations of poverty and need has no place in Christian outreach. Christians should denounce and refrain from offering all forms of allurements, including financial incentives and rewards, in their acts of service...as they carry out these ministries, fully respecting human dignity and ensuring that the vulnerability of people and their need for healing are not exploited." These admonitions are seen as to prevent false conversions which produce such so-called rice Christians.

== See also ==
- Religion of the Yellow Stick
- Christianity in Asia
- Christian mission
- Souperism
