= Commission of Justiciary =

Method of law enforcement employed in Scotland

A commission of justiciary was a method of law enforcement employed in Scotland, in particular in the 16th and 17th centuries.

In an era when the practical reach of central government was limited, the issuing authority (generally the king) would issue a commission to a single individual or a number of individuals authorising and requiring him or them to take steps to deal with the particular problem with which the authority was concerned. The problem might consist in a particular crime, a particular criminal or criminals, or wider local disorder.

== Commission of fire and sword ==
The powers granted under such commissions were extensive and draconian and often included the power to administer summary justice, with no subsequent obligation to account for the steps taken. The archetype was the "commission of fire and sword" which features prominently in clan history in the Highlands. A commission granted in 1649 by the estates of parliament in favour of the Earl of Sutherland contains characteristic language, authorising a number of individuals:

"to search, seek, take and apprehend the aforesaid persons, rebels and fugitives above-named, wherever they can be apprehended; and if they can be captured, to put them to the knowledge of any assize for the crimes aforesaid and to administer justice upon them and execute them to the death; and, if need be, to raise fire and sword and to burn their houses and slay them in case they make opposition or resistance in the taking and apprehending."

Notable examples of commissions of fire and sword include:

- Galbraith of Culcreuch against the Clan Gregor in 1593.
- Mackenzie of Kintail against Macleods in Lewis in 1596/7, which was intermittently renewed and led ultimately to Mackenzie’s annexation of Lewis.
- Earl of Argyll against royalists in Atholl and Angus in 1640.
- Mackintosh of Torcastle against Macdonald of Keppoch in 1681 and 1688, resulting in the Battle of Mulroy.
- Sir Hector Og Maclean, 15th Chief against the Sir James MacDonald, 9th of Dunnyveg resulting in the Battle of Benbigrie.

== Political control ==
A system of this kind was clearly open to abuse and was not infrequently employed by the great magnates to carry on personal feuds or campaigns of self-aggrandisement. In the late 16th century there was something of a power struggle between the privy council and the gentlemen of the king’s chamber for control over the process, resulting in orders by the council in 1587, 1594 and 1598, which cancelled all existing commissions, and in 1608, which cancelled commissions that permitted the bearing of fire-arms. A statute in 1592 also sought to put an end to general commissions (as opposed to particular commissions targeted against specific individuals), and the establishment of a register of signet commissions in 1608 is further evidence of the council’s (ultimately successful) campaign to regularise their issue.

== Witch-hunting ==
One form of commission of justiciary that survived until well into the 17th century was that employed for the purpose of witch-hunting.
