= Sheriff of Argyll =

The Sheriff of Argyll was historically a royal officer charged with enforcing the king's rights in Argyll; in Scotland, the concept of sheriff gradually evolved into a judicial position.

Originally, the region of Argyll was served by the sheriff of Perth, however in 1326, king Robert I appointed his step-nephew-in-law, Dougal Campbell, to the newly created position of sheriff of Argyll; Dougall was the son of Neil Campbell, whose second wife was Robert's sister, Mary. The traditional stronghold of the Campbells was in the centre of the Argyll region, and Robert had wished to reward the Campbells for their service in his successful usurpation of king John Balliol.

Though named sheriff of Argyll the position was initially limited to Lorn, but expanded in later centuries. In 1633, the sheriff of Argyll newly acquired authority over Kintyre and Knapdale, which had previously been under the sheriff of Tarbert.

Prior to 1748 most sheriffdoms were held on a hereditary basis. From that date, following the Jacobite uprising of 1745, the hereditary sheriffs were replaced by salaried sheriff-deputes, qualified advocates who were members of the Scottish Bar. The post of sheriff of Argyll continued in existence until 1948, when it was amalgamated with the sheriffdom of Renfrew to form the position of Sheriff of Renfrew and Argyll.

== Sheriffs of Argyll ==
- Dugal Campbell (12??– )
- Alasdair MacDubhgaill, Lord of Lorne, 1293–????
- Dugal Campbell (1326)
- Gillespie Campbell (1373)
- Eóin MacDubhgaill (???)
- Colin Campbell, 1st Earl of Argyll (1468)
- George Campbell 1636-1655
- Archibald Campbell, 9th Earl of Argyll (died 1685)
- James Stuart 1686–
- Colin Campbell, 1691-1710
- Archibald Campbell of Danna, 1714-1748 based on above referenced Clan Campbell entries.
- John Campbell of Danna, 1748-???? son of Archibald, as referenced in above Clan Campbell entries.

Sheriffs-Depute

- Charles Stewart, 1746-1757? Bonnie Prince Charlie's purse bearer at Battle of Culloden.
- Archibald Campbell of Stonefield, –1776
- Robert Campbell of Asknish, 1776– >1808
- Donald MacLachlan, –1817
- Sir Humphrey Trafford Campbell, 1817–1818
- Robert Bruce, 1818–>1843
- George Campbell, Duke of Argyll, 1847–????
- Edward Francis Maitland, 1851–1855
- Thomas Cleghorn, 1855–1874
- Alexander Forbes Irvine, 1874–1891
- D. Mackechnie, 1892–1898
- James Ferguson, 1898–1905
- Alexander Logan M'Clure, 1905–1920 (Sheriff of Aberdeen, 1920–1932)
- Andrew Henderson Briggs Constable, KC, 1920–1920
- John Lean Wark, 1920–1933
- John Robert Dickson, KC, 1933–1937
- Charles Mackintosh, KC, 1937–1942 (Sheriff of Inverness, Elgin & Nairn, 1942)
- James Frederick Strachan, KC, 1942–1945 (Sheriff of Perth and Angus, 1945)
- Thomas Murray-Taylor, KC, 1945–1946 (Sheriff of Renfrew and Argyll, 1946–1948)
- For sheriffs after 1946 see Sheriff of Renfrew and Argyll

== See also ==
- Historical development of Scottish sheriffdoms
