= Alexander Cunningham, 5th Earl of Glencairn =

Scottish nobleman (~1515–1574)

Alexander Cunningham
- Earl of Glencairn, Lord Kilmaurs
- Predecessor: William Cunningham, 4th Earl of Glencairn
- Successor: William Cunningham, 6th Earl of Glencairn
- Born: 1515
- Died: 23 November 1574
- Noble family: Cunningham
- Spouse: Lady Janet Hamilton
- Issue: William Cunningham, 6th Earl of Glencairn
- Father: William Cunningham, 4th Earl of Glencairn
- Mother: Catherine Borthwick

Alexander Cunningham, 5th Earl of Glencairn (Born around 1515 and died 23 November 1574) was a Scottish nobleman and Protestant reformer, prominent in the Scottish Reformation.

== Biography ==
Alexander Cunningham was the son of William Cunningham, 4th Earl of Glencairn by his first wife, Catherine Borthwick, the second daughter of William Borthwick, 3rd Lord Borthwick. He followed in his father's footsteps as a Protestant and was among the first of the Scots' nobility who concurred with the Scottish Reformation.

By 1540, Cunningham, who was then styled as Lord Kilmaurs, was associated with the cause of reform, writing a satirical poem about the Grey Friars, which was later reprinted by John Knox in his History of the Reformation in Scotland. Lord Kilmaurs succeeded as Earl of Glencairn upon the death of his father in 1548. Finlaystone House and estate in Inverclyde was the seat of the Earls of Glencairn and chiefs of clan Cunningham from 1405 to 1796.

In 1555, on the return of Knox to Scotland, he resorted openly to hear him preach. When Knox, at the request of the Earl Marischal, addressed to the Queen Regent, Mary of Guise a letter in which he earnestly exhorted her to protect the reformed preachers, and to consent to a Reformation in the church, Glencairn had the boldness to deliver it to Her Majesty, who, after glancing carelessly over it, handed to James Beaton, Archbishop of Glasgow, and contemptuously said: "Please you, my lord, to read as pasquil!".

In 1556, he entertained Knox at his house of Finlaystone House, when the sacrament of the Lord's Supper, after the manner of the Reformed church, was administered to his whole family and some friends. In December 1557 he was one of the leaders of the Reform Party who subscribed to the memorable Covenant which had been drawn up for the support and defence of the Protestant religion, and who thenceforth assumed the name the Lords of the Congregation.

In 1559, in consequence of the rigorous proceedings against Protestants by the Queen Regent, he and his relative, Sir Hugh Campbell of Loudon, the Sheriff of Ayr, requested an audience of Her Majesty, at which they reminded her of her promises of religious toleration. On the Queen's replying that "promises ought not to be urged upon princes, unless they can conveniently fulfil them"; "then", they said, "since you are resolved to keep no faith with your subjects we will renounce our allegiance", an answer which induced her to stop her proceedings.

In May of that year, when the Reformers at Perth found it necessary to protect themselves by force of arms, Glencairn joined them with 1,200 horse and 1,300 foot, which he had raised in the west of the country. After the Protestant religion had been established by parliament in 1560, the earl was nominated a member of Queen Mary's Privy Council.

He and the Earl of Morton with William Maitland of Lethington were sent as ambassadors to Queen Elizabeth I of England with a proposal, for the strengthening of the bonds of amity between the two nations, that she should accept as a husband the Earl of Arran, the heir to the Scottish Crown, which she declined.

Glencairn was amongst the nobles who opposed the marriage of Mary, Queen of Scots, with Lord Darnley. Glencairn later had a principal command in the army embodied against the Queen in June 1567 at the 'battle' of Carberry Hill, and when the French ambassador came from the Queen, promising the forgiveness if they would disperse, he replied that "they came not to ask pardon for any offence they had done, but to grant pardon to those who had offended".

When Mary, Queen of Scots, was taken to Lochleven Castle that month, Glencairn hastened with his domestics to the Chapel Royal of Holyroodhouse and destroyed all the sacred images, demolished the altar, tore down the pictures, and defaced all the ornaments.

== Succession ==
Alexander Cunningham, 5th Earl of Glencairn was buried in the family crypt at the Glencairn Aisle in Kilmaurs, East Ayrshire. He was succeeded in the earldom by his eldest son, the Master of Glencairn: William Cunningham, 6th Earl of Glencairn.

== Writings ==
A satirical poem against the Popish Party, entitled The Hermit of Allareit or Loretto, near Musselburgh, written by Lord Glencairn, and preserved in Knox's History of the Reformation, is also found in Sibbald's Chronicle of Scottish Poetry.

== Arms ==
Couché. A shakefork. Crest: on a helmet with coronet, a unicorn head. Supporters: two conies sejant.

== Sources ==
- Anderson, William, The Scottish Nation, Edinburgh, 1867, vol v, pp. 311-312.

Peerage of Scotland
Preceded by William Cunningham	Earl of Glencairn; 1548–1574	Succeeded by William Cunningham
