= Hector Maclean, 4th Laird of Coll =

Hector Maclean, 4th Laird of Coll (flourished 1560) was the son of John Abrach Maclean, 2nd Laird of Coll, and had a brother, John Maclean, 3rd Laird of Coll.

== Biography ==
Hector made greater progress in letters than any other man in the country in which he lived during that period. He understood Latin well, and devoted much of his time to the writing of poetry, in both Latin and Gaelic, fragments of which are still preserved. These compositions testify that he was devout. On account of his literary character he was called Cleireach beag, or little clerk. That he was well adapted for an emergency is illustrated in the art he exhibited in appeasing the wrath of Ailean nan Sop. The official records show a "gift to Hector McClane, brother and heir of the deceased John McClane of Coll of the non-entry of Coll, 24 April 1558." June 28, 1559, is recorded a precept for charter to Hector, son and heir apparent of Hector MacLean of Coll, of the lands of Coll, on resignation by the father. In 1561 a feud broke out between the families of Duart and Coll on account of the former insisting on the latter following him in all his private quarrels, like the other gentlemen of the clan. Coll declined on account that he held his lands direct from the crown. The Coll family was brought to the very brink of ruin.

He was succeeded by his eldest son, Hector Roy Maclean, 5th Laird of Coll.

== Children ==
Hector was first married to Meve, daughter of Alexander MacDonald, 5th of Dunnyveg, by whom he had:

- Hector Roy Maclean, 5th Laird of Coll
- Margaret Maclean, married to John Dubh Maclean, predecessor of the Macleans of Kinlochaline
- Jannet Maclean, married to John Garbh Maclean, son of John Dubh Maclean

Hector was married a second time, to Finovola, daughter of Godfrey MacAllister of Loup, by whom he had two sons:

- Allan Maclean, founder of the family of Achanasaul on Mull. (His son Iain Dhuibh moved to Uig, Isle of Lewis in 1696. He had 5 sons and they all settled on Lewis. Iain Dhuibh's direct descendants still live in the same bay at Uig Sands.
- John, founder of the house of Grishipoll.
