= Hector Roy Maclean, 5th Laird of Coll =

16th-century Scottish nobleman

Hector Roy Maclean, 5th Laird of Coll (flourished c. 1590–1596)

== Biography ==
He was the son of Hector Maclean, 4th Laird of Coll. He married Marian, daughter of Hector Og Maclean, 13th Clan Chief. Hector Roy died young, and had a single child, Lachlan Maclean, 6th Laird of Coll.
