= John Dubh Maclean, 1st Laird of Morvern =

John Dubh MacLean, 1st Laird of Morvern was the progenitor of the Macleans of Kinlochaine, Drimnin, and Pennycross. Dubh means black in Scottish Gaelic.

== Biography ==
He was the second son of Hector Mor Maclean, 12th Clan Chief.

John Dubh was married three times, and by his second wife, Catherine, he had:

- Allan Maclean of Ardtornish, who was father of Lachlan Maclean of Calgary, who by his second wife, Anne, had Allan Maclean of Grulin, who by his wife, Una, had Charles of Kilunaig, who by his wife, Marianna, was father of Alexander Maclean, 1st Laird of Pennycross who was bred to the medical profession, and was married in 1700 to Una, daughter of Alexander MacGillivray of Pennyghael, by whom he had Archibald, his successor, and Catherine, married to Major Donald MacLean of the royal Scots regiment. Alexander's son was Archibald Maclean, 2nd Laird of Pennycross who was born in the year 1761, and died February 17, 1830. He was much esteemed in the circle of his-acquaintances; was for some time major of the 3rd regiment of Argyleshire fencibles, and one of the deputy lieutenants for the county. He married Alicia, daughter of Hector MacLean of Torren, by whom he had nine sons and three daughters, of whom the following reached maturity: Alexander, his successor; Allan Thomas, Charles James, Mary, John, Juliana, Hector, Lachlan, and Archibald Donald. Allan Thomas became lieutenant general. Charles James in 1813 entered the service of the 70th Highlanders, and was in every engagement of that regiment from the above year to the victory at Waterloo, where he carried the colours. Afterward he became a lieutenant in the 31st regiment of foot, and died at Calcutta in May, 1837. Mary died unmarried, in 1837. John was for some time a surgeon, but afterward joined the Second West India Regiment, commanded by his maternal uncle, Alexander MacLean, and attained to the rank of lieutenant. He died in Nassau, Bahamas, in 1822.

== Ancestors ==
John Dubh Maclean of Morvern's ancestors in three generations
John Dubh Maclean of Morvern	Father: Hector Mor Maclean, 12th Clan Chief	Paternal Grandfather: Lachlan Cattanach Maclean	Paternal Great-Grandfather:
John Dubh Maclean of Morvern	Father: Hector Mor Maclean, 12th Clan Chief	Paternal Grandfather: Lachlan Cattanach Maclean	Paternal Great-grandmother:
John Dubh Maclean of Morvern	Father: Hector Mor Maclean, 12th Clan Chief	Paternal Grandmother:	Paternal Great-Grandfather:
John Dubh Maclean of Morvern	Father: Hector Mor Maclean, 12th Clan Chief	Paternal Grandmother:	Paternal Great-Grandmother:
John Dubh Maclean of Morvern	Mother:	Maternal Grandfather:	Maternal Great-Grandfather:
John Dubh Maclean of Morvern	Mother:	Maternal Grandfather:	Maternal Great-Grandmother:
John Dubh Maclean of Morvern	Mother:	Maternal Grandmother:	Maternal Great-grandfather:
John Dubh Maclean of Morvern	Mother:	Maternal Grandmother:	Maternal Great-Grandmother:
