= Lachlan Mor Maclean =

Sir Lachlan Mor Maclean, 14th Chief
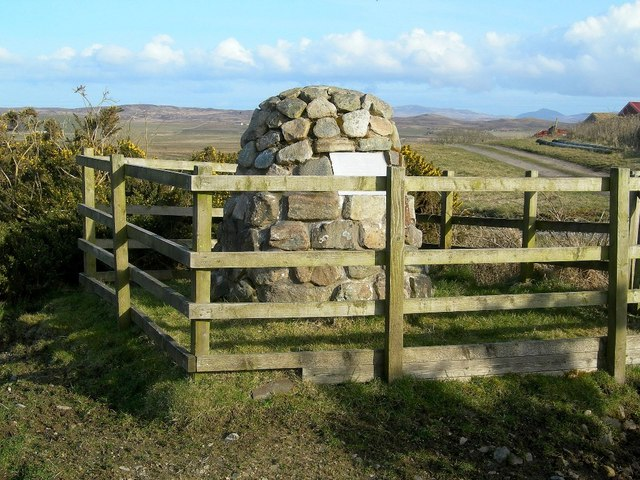

14th Clan Chief 10th Laird of Duart
- In office 1573-1598
- Preceded by: Hector Og Maclean, 13th Chief, father
- Succeeded by: Hector Og Maclean, 15th Chief, son

Personal details
- Born: 1558
- Died: 1598 (age 40) Battle of Traigh Ghruinneart
- Cause of death: Killed in action
- Spouse(s): Margaret, daughter of William Cunningham, 6th Earl of Glencairn
- Children: Hector Og Maclean, 15th Chief; Lachlan Og MacLean, 1st Laird of Torloisk
- Parent: Hector Og Maclean, 13th Chief
- Nickname(s): Sir Lachlan Mor Maclean of Duart; Big Lachlan; Lachlan the Great

Sir Lachlan Mór Maclean (1558 – 5 August 1598) or Big Lachlan Maclean, was the 14th Clan Chief of Clan MacLean from late 1573 or early 1574 until 1598. Mór or Mor translates as big in English, or magnus in Latin, when added to a name in Scottish Gaelic.

== Life ==
He was born in 1558 to Eachuinn Og Maclean. Sir Lachlan became the 14th Chief of Clan Maclean at the death of his father in 1573 or 1574.

"He was called 'Big Lachlan,' both on account of his stature and the greatness of his mind. He was the most accomplished and warlike chief that ever held sway in Duart. His military talents were of a very high order; his chivalrous character commanded the respect of his most inveterate foes, and his personal interest for and kindness toward his followers endeared him to his clansmen. So great were his qualities that historians have been forced to pay tribute to his memory."

In June 1588, he was charged with massacring 18 members of Clan Donald who attended the wedding party of his mother Janet Campbell and his new stepfather John MacKane in April 1588 at Torloisk. John MacKane of Ardmurchin was imprisoned and tortured. Because he failed to appear to answer the charges, he was denounced as a rebel.

In September 1588 a ship from the Spanish Armada ("San Juan de Sicilia") carrying 300 troops and silver plate for the use of noblemen was wrecked or run aground on the coast of Islay or Mull. Lachlan sent news of the ship to James VI at Stirling Castle. Lachlan Mòr befriended the crew and borrowed two cannon and 100 soldiers to besiege the house of Angus MacAulay, leaving a hostage as a pledge. After this, a man called John Smallet set a fuse made of lint in the gunpowder store and blew the ship up. In October 1588 he gathered a force including 100 Spanish soldiers against Clan MacDonald of Clanranald and raided the Isles of Canna, Rùm, Eigg, and "Elennole", and besieged Mingary Castle, the stronghold of Clan MacDonald of Ardnamurchan.

Maclean fought for James VI at the Battle of Glenlivet in October 1594 during the uprising of the Catholic earls of Huntly and Erroll. In August 1595 he wrote to the English ambassador in Edinburgh, Robert Bowes to thank him for the 1,000 French crowns that Queen Elizabeth was sending him, and to discuss the recruitment of Galloglass warriors from Clan MacLean to fight in the Nine Years' War in Ireland against the armies of Aodh Mór Ó Néill, Chief of Clan O'Neill, and Lord of Tír Eoghain.

The Earl of Argyll brought him to the king at Inchmurrin on Loch Lomond in August 1596 and he was received in royal favour and went hawking with the king. He was forgiven of all his former alleged offences by James VI of Scotland in person at Holyrood Palace on 15 June 1596.

== Marriage and children ==
He married Lady Margaret Cunningham of Glencairn, daughter of William Cunningham, 6th Earl of Glencairn. They had the following children:

- Hector Og Maclean, 15th Clan Chief
- Lachlan Og Maclean, 1st Laird of Torloisk
- Gillean Maclean, married to Mary the elder, daughter of John Dubh Maclean of Morvern
- Allan Maclean, married to Mary the younger, daughter of John Dubh Maclean of Morvern
- Charles Maclean
- Bethag Maclean, married to Hector MacLean of Lochbuie, 9th Chief

== Death ==
He died on 5 August 1598 in the Battle of Traigh Ghruinneart on the Island of Islay. He was killed by the forces of Sir James MacDonald, 9th of Dunnyveg.

His remains were left on the battlefield. A day or two after the battle, it is said that two women, of whom different accounts are given — some calling them strangers, some clanswomen, some relations of the dead — grieving to think that the body of so notable a chief as Sir Lachlan Mor should be unburied and uncared for on the moorland, came from a distance in search of it. They hired a vehicle, the only one to be had in the neighborhood, and having found the corpse, proceeded to carry it to the nearest burying-grounds, about six miles distant. The way was rough, and the driver looking behind him saw the head of the great chief, which extended beyond the car, nodding to him at every jolt, as if it had life, and were giving him directions. At the next heavy rut he looked again to please his savage soul with ferocious enjoyment. But this time the elder female, who had watched him, acted as described in the ballad, and killed the brutal driver with the chieftain's dagger. Then, along with her companion, she brought the mortal remains of Sir Lachlan to the place where they still lie buried.

Sir Lachlan Mor MacLean was buried in the churchyard of Kilchoman on Islay, near the south wall of the church, and over his grave is laid a great stone. There is another churchyard, Kilnave, closer to the battle-field; but the body was taken to Kilchoman that it might be more honored, for he was buried inside the church, and when a new church was built there, around 1829, the wall was so constructed that the grave was left outside the church.

== Legacy ==
The plaque that marks the spot where he died says: "This cairn indicates the spot where, on the 5th August, 1598, Sir Lachlan Mor Maclean of Duart fell in a desperate encounter with his nephew Sir James Macdonald of Knockrinsay. The battle of Traigh Ghruinneart is the best known incident in the feud between the Macleans and the Macdonalds for the Rinns "

== Ancestors ==
Sir Lachlan Mor Maclean's ancestors in three generations
| Sir Lachlan Mor Maclean | Father: Eachuinn Og Maclean | Paternal Grandfather: Eachuinn Mor Maclean | Paternal Great-Grandfather: Lachlan Cattanach Maclean |
| Sir Lachlan Mor Maclean | Father: Eachuinn Og Maclean | Paternal Grandfather: Eachuinn Mor Maclean | Paternal Great-grandmother: Katherine, daughter of Archibald Campbell, 2nd Earl of Argyll |
| Sir Lachlan Mor Maclean | Father: Eachuinn Og Maclean | Paternal Grandmother: Mary MacDonald of Islay and the Glens | Paternal Great-Grandfather: Alexander MacDonald of Islay and the Glens |
| Sir Lachlan Mor Maclean | Father: Eachuinn Og Maclean | Paternal Grandmother: Mary MacDonald of Islay and the Glens | Paternal Great-Grandmother: |
| Sir Lachlan Mor Maclean | Mother: Janet Campbell of Argyll | Maternal Grandfather: Archibald Campbell, 4th Earl of Argyll | Maternal Great-Grandfather: Colin Campbell, 3rd Earl of Argyll |
| Sir Lachlan Mor Maclean | Mother: Janet Campbell of Argyll | Maternal Grandfather: Archibald Campbell, 4th Earl of Argyll | Maternal Great-Grandmother: Jean, daughter of Alexander Gordon, 3rd Earl of Huntly |
| Sir Lachlan Mor Maclean | Mother: Janet Campbell of Argyll | Maternal Grandmother: | Maternal Great-grandfather: |
| Sir Lachlan Mor Maclean | Mother: Janet Campbell of Argyll | Maternal Grandmother: | Maternal Great-Grandmother: |
