= Sir James MacDonald, 9th of Dunnyveg =

Sir James MacDonald
- Died: 1626; London, England
- Resting place: St. Martins Church, London
- Other names: Sir James MacDonald, Knight of Knockrinsay
- Title: 9th Clan Chief
- Predecessor: Angus MacDonald, 8th of Dunnyveg

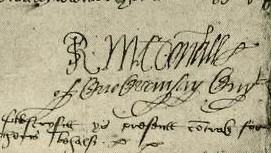
1597 Bond by Sir James "MacDonald" of Knockrinsay signs his signature as M'Connall. He is listed below as Seamus, 9th of Dunnyveg

Sir James MacDonald, 9th of Dunnyveg (Scottish Gaelic: Séamus Mac Dòmhnuill; died 1626), was the last chief of Clan MacDonald of Dunnyveg or Clan Donald South. He was most often known as James M'Connall from the Gaelic pronunciation of the name Mac Dhòmhnaill, the modern Macdonald spelling being the anglicization of the name.

== Biography ==
He was a son of Angus MacDonald, 8th of Dunnyveg. He was a hostage and imprisoned a number of times in his lifetime. He was knighted Sir James of Knockrinsay. At the Battle of Traigh Ghruinneart on the Isle of Islay in 1598, he led forces against Sir Lachlan Mor MacLean, 14th Chief of Duart. James was wounded in battle but his forces killed MacLean.

He then fought Hector Og Maclean, 15th Chief who sought revenge for the death of his father in the Battle of Benbigrie.

Following the Battle of Benbigrie, James fled to Ireland; returning to Scotland, he was captured by the Earl of Argyll and subsequently imprisoned in Edinburgh Castle from 1604 to 1615. In the spring of 1615, James escaped captivity and led a force to recapture Dunyveg Castle from Sir John Campbell of Cawdor in June, holding it until the castle was recaptured by a force under the Earl of Argyll in October. Following James's defeat at Islay, he fled to Spain and, after returning from exile, was given a pension from King James VI of Scotland and lived in London, never visiting Scotland again and died in London in 1626. He was buried in St. Martin's Church, London.

== Family ==
He married Margaret, daughter of Sir John Campbell of Cawdor, without issue. He supposedly fathered a son Donald Gorm, to an unknown woman. (need citation)
