= Battle of Traigh Ghruinneart =

Scottish clan battle

Battle of Traigh Ghruinneart Scottish Gaelic: Blàr Tràigh Ghruineart
- Part of the Scottish clan battles
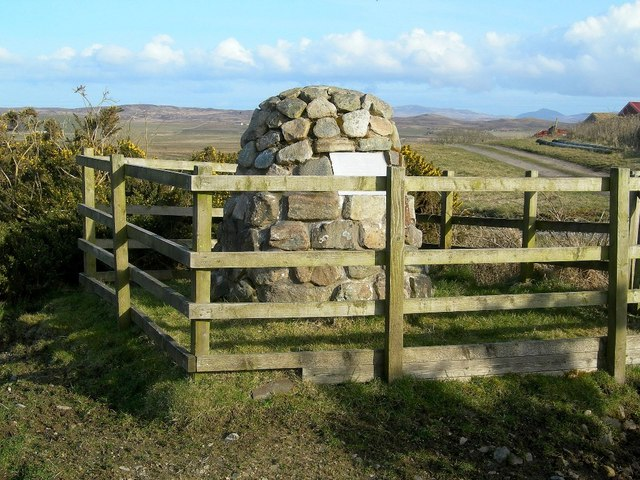
- Cairn marking the spot where Sir Lachlan Mor Maclean fell in battle
Date	5 August 1598
Location	Islay, Scotland 55.822°N 6.355°W
Result	MacDonald victory

Belligerents
Clan Donald	Clan MacLean

Commanders and leaders
Sir James MacDonald	Sir Lachlan MacLean †

Strength
300–500 men	800–1,000 men

Casualties and losses
30 dead 60 wounded	280 dead

The Battle of Traigh Ghruinneart or in Scottish Gaelic Blàr Tràigh Ghruineart or sometimes called the Battle of Gruinart Strand was a Scottish clan battle fought on 5 August 1598, on the Isle of Islay, in the Hebrides. It was fought between the Clan Donald and Clan Maclean. A tràigh or stand is the flat area of land bordering a body of water, a beach, or shoreline.

== History ==
The Isle of Islay had belonged to Clan MacDonald whose leader was Sir James MacDonald, 9th of Dunnyveg, the son of Clan chief Angus MacDonald and who may have already imprisoned his father, and a nephew of Sir Lachlan Mor Maclean.

Sir Lachlan Mor Maclean claimed that the island belonged to his clan and landed about 800 to 1,000 men at Loch Ghruinneart. MacDonald offered his uncle half of the island for MacLean's lifetime only, but he refused unless he received the entire island.

James MacDonald had fewer troops but they were well trained. Allies to the Clan MacDonald sent men from Kintyre and Arran, including Clan MacAlister, which were led by Angus MhicMhuirich of Arran. MacDonald's forces feigned retreat toward the setting sun then turned around to fight with the sun in the eyes of their enemy. The MacDonalds were victorious and the MacLeans were defeated.

A dwarf named Dubh Sith (Black Fairy) was hidden in a tree and he killed Sir Lachlan Mor Maclean with a shot through his eye after he had removed his helmet.

With Sir Lachlan Mor Maclean and about 280 of his men killed in battle, the rest were chased to their boats and some sought refuge in the chapel of Kilnave. The chapel was burnt down, killing all but one of the men inside.

Sir James MacDonald was seriously wounded after being shot through the body with an arrow. He was found after the battle amongst the dead MacDonalds, which also included Angus MhicMhuirich of Arran. About 30 MacDonalds were slain and 60 wounded.

Afterwards King James VI, awarded MacDonald lands to Clan Campbell, leading to an extension of the feud.

Clan MacDonald's reign in Islay came to an end in 1612 when Angus MacDonald, 8th of Dunnyveg, the father of Sir James, sold his land holdings to Sir John Campbell of Cawdor of Clan Campbell of Cawdor.
