= Roderick MacLeod of MacLeod =

Scottish clan chief (about 1559–1626)

Sir Roderick MacLeod
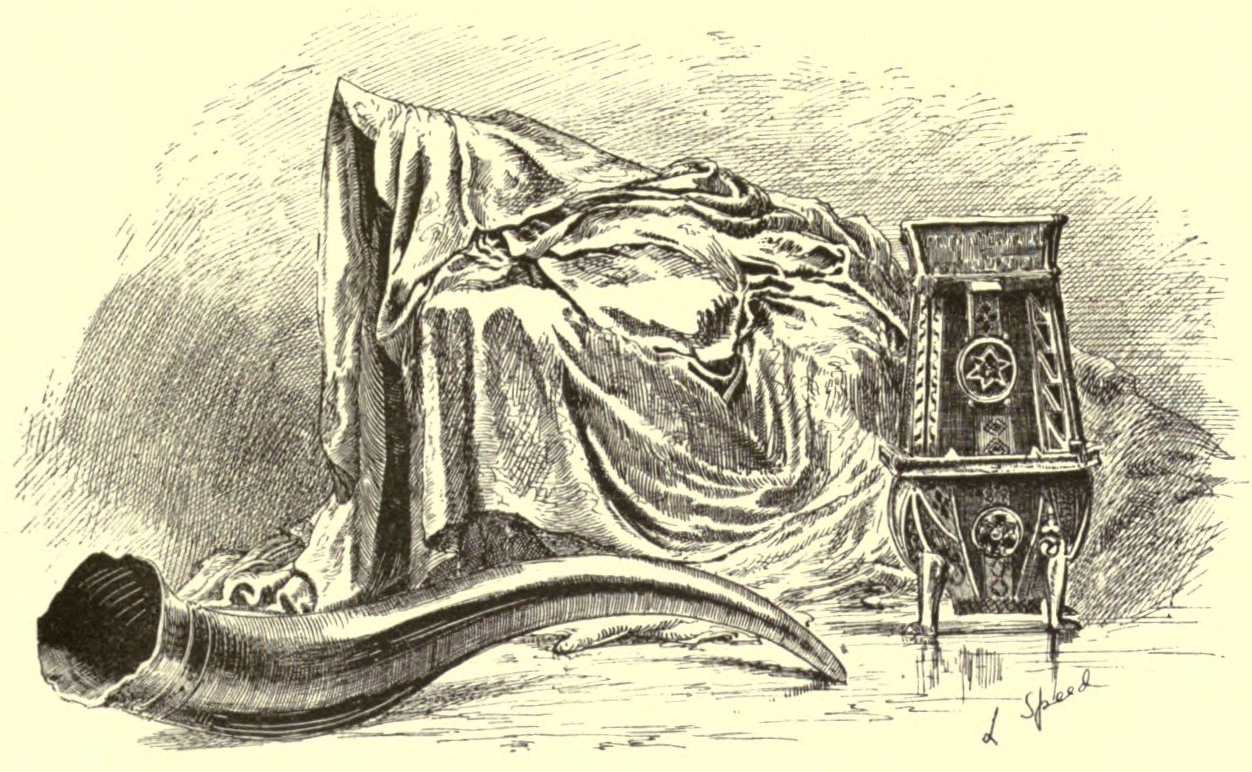
- Relics of Rory Mor including his drinking horn
- Born: 1559, 1562 or 1573
- Died: 1626
- Title: The 15th Chief of Clan MacLeod
- Predecessor: John (nephew)
- Successor: John MacLeod (son)
- Children: John MacLeod, 16th Chief; Mary MacLeod MacLean (married Lachlan Maclean of Duart)

MacLeod arms

Sir Roderick MacLeod of MacLeod (c. 1559 – 1626), also known as Rory MacLeod (Scots Gaelic: Ruairidh Mór, 'Rory the Great'), was the 15th Chief of Clan MacLeod and one of the most famed and notorious chiefs of that clan.

== Early life ==
Roderick MacLeod of MacLeod, also known as "Rory Mor" or "Ruairidh Mor", was born in Dunvegan, Scotland in 1573 and was the 15th chief of the Clan MacLeod. He was the second son of Norman MacLeod of MacLeod (c. 1516–1585) the 12th chief of the Clan MacLeod. He became chief upon the death of his young nephew in 1595.

== Career ==
Sir Roderick went to Ireland with 500 of his clan to assist Hugh Roe O'Donnell's war against the English. Upon his return he became involved in a feud with his brother-in-law Donald Gorm Og MacDonald, who was chief of the powerful Clan MacDonald of Sleat. The two clans had fought together in Ireland and had now become enemies when MacDonald rejected his wife, Margaret, Sir Roderick's sister, due to her becoming blind in one eye and not producing him an heir.Macdonald sent his wife back to Roderick on a one-eyed horse, led by a one-eyed servant, and followed by a one eyed dog. The insult caused Roderick to be enraged so the two clans finally met in the Battle of Coire Na Creiche and the MacLeods were defeated. This was the last clan battle on the Isle of Skye.

In December 1597, an act of the Estates was passed that required that all the Chieftains and Landlords of the Highlands and the Western Isles to produce their title-deeds under pain of forfeiture. Sir Roderick ignored the act and a gift of his estates were given to a number of Fife gentlemen for the purpose of colonisation. After these attempts were dealt with, he was ultimately successful in getting a remission from King James VI of Scotland dated 4 May 1610 for his lands of Harris, Dunvegan, and Glenelg.

=== Rory Mor's Horn ===
One of the prize possessions of the Clan MacLeod is Sir Rory Mor's Horn. It is kept at Dunvegan Castle on the Isle of Skye, Scotland. Sir Rory Mor's Horn is a drinking horn, made of an ox's horn, tipped in silver. The rim around the mouth of the horn is thick and bears seven imprinted medallions. Three of the medallions depict beasts, three depict patterns, and the seventh and joining medallion shows both a pattern and a beast. R. C. MacLeod considered the work to be Norse, and declared the horn to date from the 10th century.

== Personal life ==
In c. 1598, MacLeod married Elizabeth MacDonald, daughter of the 8th Chief of Clan MacDonald of Glengarry. Together they had eleven children, five sons and six daughters, including:

- Margaret MacLeod of Macleod, who married Hector Mor Maclean, 16th Chief of Clan Maclean;
- Moire Macleod, whose contract of marriage with John MacDonald 12th of Clanranald, son of Donald MacDonald 11th of Clanranald, is dated 15 Feb 1613;
- Mary MacLeod of Macleod who married Sir Lachlan Maclean, 1st Baronet and 17th Chief of Clan Maclean;
- Ian Mor Macleod of Macleod, 16th Chief (died 1649), who married Sybella Mackenzie, daughter of Kenneth Mackenzie, 1st Lord Mackenzie of Kintail and Anne Ross;
- Sir Norman MacLeod, 1st Lord of Berneray, 4th Chief of Waternish, who married Katherine Macdonald, daughter of Sir James Mor Macdonald, 9th Laird of Sleat, 2nd Baronet and Margaret Mackenzie. He was knighted by King James VI of Scotland in 1613.
- Sir Roderick Macleod, 1st of Talisker (1606–1675), who married Mary Mackay, daughter of Donald Mackay, 1st Lord Reay. After her death, he married Mary Mackinnon, daughter of Sir Lachlan Mackinnon of Strathaird, 28th Chief of MacKinnon.

Sir Roderick MacLeod of MacLeod died in 1626 and was buried at the Fortrose Abbey just north of Inverness, Scotland. Upon his death, his oldest son John "Iain/Ian Mor Macleod of Macleod, 16th Chief (c. 1600–1649) became chief of the Clan MacLeod.
