= Colin Cam Mackenzie, 11th of Kintail =

- Died: 14 June 1594
- Children: Kenneth, Roderick, Colin, Janet,
- Parent(s): Kenneth Mackenzie of Kintail; Lady Elizabeth Stewart

Colin Mackenzie of Kintail (died 14 June 1594), nicknamed "Cam" ("crooked", because one-eyed), was a Highland chief of the Scottish clan Mackenzie who greatly increased his ancestral estates through royal favour and a career of vigorous self-aggrandisement.

== Origins ==
Mackenzie was the second, but eldest surviving, son of Kenneth Mackenzie, 10th of Kintail (died 6 June 1568) and Lady Elizabeth Stewart, the daughter of John Stewart, 2nd Earl of Atholl. The Mackenzies were a clan from Ross-shire that had risen to prominence in the 15th century during the disintegration of the Lordship of the Isles.

== Royal favour ==
Mackenzie fought for Mary, Queen of Scots, at the Battle of Langside in the year 1568 where she was defeated and forced into exile. He subsequently became a favourite of her son King James. According to his descendant the Earl of Cromartie, "there was none in the North for whom the King hade a greater esteem than for this Colin. He made him one of his Privie Councillors, and oft tymes invited him to be nobilitate [ennobled]; but Colin always declined it, aiming rather to have his familie remarkable for power, as it were, above their qualitie than for titles that equalled their power."

== Inheritance ==
According to the Origines Parochiales Scotiae, "in 1570 King James VI granted to Coline Makcainze, the son and apparent heir of the deceased Canzeoch of Kintaill, permission to be served heir in his minority to all the lands and rents in the Sheriffdom of Inverness, in which his father died last vest and seised. In 1572 the same King confirmed a grant made by Colin Makcanze of Kintaill to Barbara Graunt, his affianced spouse, in fulfilment of a contract between him and John Grant of Freuchie, dated 25 April 1571, of his lands of Climbo [Claonaboth], Keppach [Keppoch], and Ballichon, Mekle Innerennet, Derisduan [Dorusduain] Beg, Little Innerennet, Derisduan [Dorusduain] Moir, Auchadrein, Kirktoun, Ardtulloch, Rovoch, Quhissil, Tullych, Derewall and Nuik, Inchchro, Morowoch, Glenlik, Innersell and Nuik, Ackazarge, Kinlochbeancharan [Loch Beannacharain], and Innerchonray, in the Earldom of Ross, and Sheriffdom of Inverness. In 1574 the same Colin was served heir to his father Kenneth McKeinzie in the davach of Letterfernane, the davach of Glenshall, and other lands in the barony of Ellendonane of the old extent of five marks."

== The Chanonry of Ross ==
In 1570 a quarrel broke out between the Mackenzies and the Munros. John Lesley, the celebrated Bishop of Ross, who had been secretary to Queen Mary, dreading the effect of public feeling against prelacy in the North, and against himself personally, made over to his cousin Leslie of Balquhair, his rights and titles to Chanonry Castle, together with the castle lands, in order to divest them of the character of church property, and so save them to his family. Notwithstanding this grant, the Regent Moray gave the custody of the castle to Andrew Munro of Milntown, a rigid presbyterian, and in high favour with Moray. Moray promised Leslie some of the lands of the barony of Fintry in Buchan as an equivalent but died before this arrangement was carried out. But Leslie ultimately obtained permission from the Earl of Lennox, during his regency, and afterwards from the Earl of Mar, his successor in that office, to get possession of the castle.

Wishing to obtain the castle for themselves, the Mackenzies purchased Leslie's right, by virtue of which they demanded delivery of the castle. When this was refused by the Munros, Mackenzie embarked on a lengthy campaign to take the castle by force. The Munros held out for three years, but eventually capitulated. They continued on bad terms with the Mackenzies for many years thereafter.

== Feud with the Macdonells of Glengarry ==
In 1580 a quarrel broke out between the Mackenzies and the Macdonells of Glengarry. The Chief of Glengarry had inherited part of Lochalsh, Lochcarron, and Lochbroom, from his grandmother, Margaret, one of the sisters and co-heiresses of Sir Donald Macdonald of Lochalsh, and granddaughter of Celestine of the Isles. Colin's father, Kenneth Mackenzie, had acquired the other part by purchase from Dingwall of Kildun, son of the other co-heiress of Sir Donald, on 24 November 1554, and Queen Mary had confirmed the grant by Royal charter. The friction arising from this close proximity between Mackenzie and Macdonell erupted into an open feud, in the course of which Ruairi Mackenzie of Redcastle (Colin's brother) invaded Glengarry's lands with 200 men: Macdonell himself was taken prisoner and his three uncles murdered. In 1582 Macdonell complained to the Privy Council, who, investigating the matter, caused Strome Castle, which Macdonald yielded to Mackenzie as one of the conditions of his release, to be placed under the temporary custody of the Earl of Argyll. According to the records of the Privy Council, Kintail himself was detained at Blackness Castle in open ward to answer such charges as might be brought against him.

Whatever Colin's personal involvement in the murders may have been, his relationship with James VI did not fail him and, in 1586, the King granted a remission to "Colin McKainzie of Kintaill and Rodoric McKainzie of Auchterfailie" (Redcastle), "his brother, for being art and part in the cruel murder of Rodoric McAllester in Stroll; Gorie McAllester, his brother, in Stromcraig; Ronnald McGorie, the son of the latter; John Roy McAllane vic Allester, in Pitnean; John Dow McAllane vic Allester, in Kirktoun of Lochcarroun; Alexander McAllanroy, servitor of the deceased Rodoric; Sir John Monro in Lochbrume; John Monro, his son; John Monro Hucheoun, and the rest of their accomplices, under silence of night, upon the lands of Ardmanichtyke, Dalmartene, Kirktoun of Lochcarroun, Blahat, and other parts within the baronies of Lochcarroun, Lochbrume, Ros, and Kessane, in the Sheriffdom of Inverness," and for all their other past crimes.

== Discomfiture of the Earl of Huntly ==
Colin's brother, Rory "Mor" Mackenzie of Redcastle was also involved in an episode that occurred in the course of the Earl of Huntly's pursuit of a commission of fire and sword against Mackintosh of Mackintosh. Mackintosh was married to the Mackenzies' sister, which led Colin to send a message to Huntly requesting that she be politely treated. When Huntly returned an abrupt and discourteous response, Colin sent a force of 400 men under Rory to overtake him. The size of Mackenzie's forces and the speed with which they had been assembled and deployed apparently dissuaded Huntly from pursuing his commission further.

== Relationship with the Privy Council ==
A career like Mackenzie's did not leave him without enemies and the records of the Privy Council are full of the complaints made by those aggrieved by him, including (for example) Christian Scrymgeour, widow of the Bishop of Ross, Henry, Lord Methven, Macdonell of Glengarry, Hugh Fraser of Guisachan, "the united burghs of the realm" and James Sinclair (the Master of Caithness).

However, it is clear that Mackenzie was a masterful navigator of the treacherous waters of 16th century Scottish politics. On 27 July 1588, he was appointed by a Convention of the Estates as a member of a Commission, charged with powers for executing the laws against Jesuits, Papists, and other delinquents, and with other extensive powers. On 24 May 1589, he was named as the Commissioner for Inverness-shire who was to convene the freeholders of the county for choosing the Commissioners to a Parliament to be held at Edinburgh on 2 October in that year. He was, along with Simon Lord Lovat, John Grant of Grant, Lachlan Mackintosh of Mackintosh, Ross of Balnagown, Hector Munro, 17th Baron of Foulis, and others, chosen an assistant Commissioner of justiciary for the counties of Elgin, Nairn, and Inverness, in March 1592–93.

He was appointed a member of the Privy Council in June 1592, but he appears not to have accepted the office on that occasion. However, he accepted the position soon after, for it is recorded under date of 5 July 1593, that "Colin Mackenzie of Kintail being admitted of the Privy Council gave his oath," in common form.

== Acquisitions of territory ==
In addition to his acquisitions in Lochalsh and Lochcarron, Colin (according to the Earl of Cromartie) "feued the Lordship of Ardmeanach, and the Barony of Delnys, Brae Ross, with the exception of Western Achnacherich, Wester Drynie, and Tarradale, which Bayne of Tulloch had feued before, but found it his interest to hold of him as immediate superior, which, with the former possessions of the lands of Chanonry, greatly enhanced his influence. Albeit his predecessors were active both in war and peace, and precedent in acquiring their estate; yet this man acquired more than all that went before him, and made such a solid progress in it, that what he had acquired was with the goodwill of his sovereign, and clear unquestionable purchase."

Colin obtained a charter of the barony of Assynt on 20 January 1591/2 (resigned by his nephew, Torquil Macleod) and a charter of the secularised Church lands of Applecross and others on 4 February 1591/2.

== Marriage and children ==
Pursuant to a marriage contract, entered into on 26 July 1570, Colin married Barbara, daughter of John Grant of Grant and Lady Marjory Stewart, daughter of John Stewart, 3rd Earl of Atholl. Her dowry was 2000 merks and the half lands of Lochbroom (which had been given to Grant in 1546, but never occupied or enjoyed by him). Their children included the following:

- Kenneth Mackenzie, 1st Lord Mackenzie of Kintail succeeded his father and was afterwards elevated to the peerage as the first Lord Mackenzie of Kintail.
- Roderick of Coigeach (c.1574–1626) became the "Tutor of Kintail" and was progenitor of the Earls of Cromartie. He married (contract 6 May 1605) Margaret, daughter and coheiress of Torquil Macleod of Lewis.
- Colin (died May 1650), of Killin, married first Catherine Macleod and secondly Isobel, daughter of John Mackenzie Yr. of Gairloch.
- Alexander married first (contract 15 August 1611) Jean, daughter of Sir Thomas Fraser of Strichen and widow of Sir James Stewart of Kilcoy, through whom he had a grant of Kilcoy on 29 January 1618.
- Murdoch (living in 1609)
- Catherine (died May 1593) married (at Dingwall in December 1589) Simon Fraser, 6th Lord Lovat.
- Janet of Kintail married Hector Og Maclean, 15th Chief.
- Mary of Kintail married Sir Donald Gorm Macdonald of Sleat.

Colin also had an illegitimate son, Alexander (died March 1650), by Margaret, daughter of Roderick Mackenzie of Davochmaluag. Alexander was the founder of the Mackenzies of Applecross and the Mackenzies of Coul.

== Death ==
Colin Cam Mackenzie died on 14 June 1594 at Redcastle and was buried at Beauly Priory.

== Ancestors ==
Colin Cam Mackenzie of Kintail's ancestors in three generations
Colin Cam Mackenzie of Kintail	Father: Kenneth Mackenzie, 10th of Kintail	Paternal Grandfather: John Mackenzie, 9th of Kintail	Paternal Great-Grandfather: Kenneth Mackenzie, 7th of Kintail
Colin Cam Mackenzie of Kintail	Father: Kenneth Mackenzie, 10th of Kintail	Paternal Grandfather: John Mackenzie, 9th of Kintail	Paternal Great-grandmother: Margaret, daughter of John of Islay, Earl of Ross
Colin Cam Mackenzie of Kintail	Father: Kenneth Mackenzie, 10th of Kintail	Paternal Grandmother: ?Janet Grant	Paternal Great-Grandfather: John Grant, 2nd of Freuchie (?–1528)
Colin Cam Mackenzie of Kintail	Father: Kenneth Mackenzie, 10th of Kintail	Paternal Grandmother: ?Janet Grant	Paternal Great-Grandmother: Margaret, daughter of Sir James Ogilvy of Deskford
Colin Cam Mackenzie of Kintail	Mother: Lady Elizabeth Stewart	Maternal Grandfather: John Stewart, 2nd Earl of Atholl	Maternal Great-Grandfather: John Stewart, 1st Earl of Atholl
Colin Cam Mackenzie of Kintail	Mother: Lady Elizabeth Stewart	Maternal Grandfather: John Stewart, 2nd Earl of Atholl	Maternal Great-Grandmother: Eleanor, daughter of William Sinclair, 3rd Earl of Orkney
Colin Cam Mackenzie of Kintail	Mother: Lady Elizabeth Stewart	Maternal Grandmother: Lady Janet Campbell	Maternal Great-grandfather: Archibald Campbell, 2nd Earl of Argyll
Colin Cam Mackenzie of Kintail	Mother: Lady Elizabeth Stewart	Maternal Grandmother: Lady Janet Campbell	Maternal Great-Grandmother: Elizabeth, daughter of John Stewart, 1st Earl of Lennox

Preceded by Kenneth Mackenzie	Chief of Clan Mackenzie; 1568–1594	Succeeded by Kenneth Mackenzie
