= William Cunningham, 6th Earl of Glencairn =

Scottish nobleman

William Cunningham, 6th Earl of Glencairn (after 1530 – c. 1578) was a Scottish nobleman.

Finlaystone House and estate in Inverclyde was the seat of the Earl of Glencairn and chief of clan Cunningham from 1405 to 1796.

== Biography ==
He was the son of Alexander Cunningham, 5th Earl of Glencairn and Janet Hamilton, daughter of James Hamilton, 1st Earl of Arran. On 20 August 1547 he married Janet Gordon of Lochinvar (died 18 November 1596), sister of John Gordon of Lochinvar. She was the daughter of Sir James Gordon of Lochinvar and Margaret Crichton. They had the following children:

- James Cunningham, 7th Earl of Glencairn
- John Cunningham, Laird of Ross
- Lady Jean Cunningham who married George Haldane of Gleneagles (died 18 October 1574). After his death she married Roger Kirkpatrick of Closeburn.
- Lady Katherine Cunningham (died 1596) who married in 1588 to Robert Fergusson, 9th Laird of Craigdarroch (died about 1611).
- Lady Margaret Cunningham who married Sir Lachlan Mor Maclean of Duart (died 5 August 1598)
- Lady Elizabeth Cunningham who married (1) in 1579 to James Crawford of Auchinames. After his death she married Alexander Cuninghame, 5th Laird of Craigends. Elizabeth died before 7 September 1614.
- Lady Susannah Cunningham who married John Napier of Kilmahew

William died between 1576 and 24 February 1579/80.

Peerage of Scotland
| Preceded by Alexander Cunningham | Earl of Glencairn; 1574–c. 1578 | Succeeded by James Cunningham |
