= Hector Odhar MacLean of Lochbuie, 9th Chief =

Hector Odhar MacLean of Lochbuie, 9th Chief (1575–1628) was the 9th Chief of Clan Maclaine of Lochbuie.

== Biography ==
Hector Odhar, ninth Maclean of Lochbuie, married the only daughter of Sir Lachlan Mor Maclean of Duart.

Hector Odhar died about 1628, leaving two sons, Murdoch Mor MacLean of Lochbuie, 10th Chief, his heir, and Lachainn Mor MacLean of Lochbuie. He had a daughter, Margaret, who married Donald Macquarrie of Ormaig.

== Children ==
- Murdoch Mor MacLean of Lochbuie, 10th Chief
- Lachainn Mor MacLean of Lochbuie
- Margaret MacLean of Lochbuie, who was married to Donald Macquarrie of Ormaig
- Allan McLean (MacLaine) progenitor of Maclaine of Kilmory and Scarba
