= Archibald Campbell, 4th Earl of Argyll =

Scottish nobleman and politician

Coordinates: 55°59′46.9″N 4°56′35.6″W

Archibald Campbell
- 4th Earl of Argyll
- Tenure: October 1529 – 1558
- Predecessor: Colin Campbell, 3rd Earl of Argyll
- Successor: Archibald Campbell, 5th Earl of Argyll
- Born: ca. 1507; Argyll, Scotland.
- Died: 1558; Dulnynn, Argyll, Scotland.
- Residence: Castle Campbell
- Noble family: Campbell
- Spouses: Lady Helen Hamilton; Lady Margaret Graham; Catherine Maclean
- Issue: Archibald Campbell, 5th Earl of Argyll; Janet Campbell, Lady of Tyrconnell; Colin Campbell, 6th Earl of Argyll; Margaret Campbell; Jeanette Campbell, Lady of Duart; Agnes Campbell
- Parents: Colin Campbell, 3rd Earl of Argyll; Lady Jean Gordon

Archibald Campbell, 4th Earl of Argyll or Archibald "the Red" Campbell (c. 1507 – 1558), was a Scottish nobleman and politician.

== Biography ==
Archibald Campbell was the eldest son of Colin Campbell, 3rd Earl of Argyll (died 1529) and Lady Jean Gordon, daughter of Alexander Gordon, 3rd Earl of Huntly. Immediately after succeeding as Earl of Argyll and to the offices of his father, in October 1529, he was put in command of an expedition to quell an insurrection in the southern Scottish Isles. The voluntary submission of the main chiefs resulted; and Alexander MacDonald of Dunnyveg, a prime mover in the insurrection, was able to convince King James V that he was personally well disposed to the government. More than that, MacDonald argued that the disturbances in the Isles were chiefly because the Earls of Argyll had made use of the office of lieutenant over the Isles, for their own personal aggrandizement. Archibald was therefore summoned before the King to give an account of the duties and rental of the Isles, received by him; and, as the result of the inquiry, he was committed for a time to prison. Shortly afterwards, he was liberated, but was deprived of his offices, and they were not restored to him until after the death of King James V.

In a charter of 28 April 1542, Archibald Campbell was called "master of the king's wine cellar". Along with the Earl of Huntly and the Earl of Moray, he was named one of the Council of the Scottish Monarchy in the document which Cardinal Beaton produced as the will of King James V, and which also appointed Beaton governor of the Kingdom and guardian to the infant Mary, Queen of Scots, daughter and heir of King James. After the arrest of Beaton, on 20 January 1543, Archibald retired to his own lands to muster a force in order to maintain the struggle against James Hamilton, Earl of Arran, who had been chosen governor. Shortly afterwards, the Earls of Argyll, Huntly, Moray, and the Earl of Bothwell, supported by many of the barons and landed gentry, as well as by the bishops and abbots, assembled at Perth, vowing their determination to resist the measures of the governor. On being summoned by the governor to disperse, they did not resist; but when it became known that King Henry VIII of England had succeeded in arranging a treaty of marriage between the young queen Mary and his son, Prince Edward Tudor, the Earls of Argyll, Huntly, Bothwell, and Lennox marched from Stirling with a force of ten thousand men, and compelled the governor to surrender to their charge, the infant Queen, with whom they returned to Stirling.

In the summer of 1544, Matthew Stewart, 4th Earl of Lennox, who had joined over to the party of King Henry VIII, plundered the Isle of Arran, and made himself master of the Isle of Bute and Rothesay Castle, with the support of eighteen ships and 800 men supplied by King Henry. As he sailed down the River Clyde, he was fired on by Archibald, who with four thousand men occupied Dunoon Castle. After a consultation with his English officers, Lennox attacked Dunoon Castle, as well as burning the nearby village and church. Sustaining great loss, Archibald was driven out of the castle. Lennox subsequently then laid waste a large part of Kintyre, but as he had not succeeded in regaining possession of his stronghold, Dumbarton Castle, Lennox retreated to his ships and sailed for England around 28 May 1544. Later, on the forfeiture of the estates of Lennox, Archibald was rewarded with the largest share. Although Lennox continued to arouse discontent in the Isles, the practical result of his actions only increased the power of the Earl of Argyll.

At the Battle of Pinkie, on 10 September 1547, the Earl of Argyll, with four thousand west Highlanders, held command of the right wing of the Scottish army. In January 1548, he advanced to Dundee to capture Broughty Castle; but English negotiators deterred him, even if he denied the rumours that he favored England and had been bought off. At the siege of Haddington, he was made "Knight of the Cockle" by King Henry II of France, at the same time as the Earls of Angus and Huntly.

Argyll wrote to Mary of Guise from Dunstaffnage Castle on 12 August 1554 after receiving her instructions to suppress rebellion in the Western Isles. He would proceed towards Mull and meet up with James McConnell and MacLaine, and Salabous, the Captain of Dunbar, had brought his soldiers.

Archibald Campbell had come under the influence of John Knox and the Scottish Reformation. On his way to Geneva in 1556, Knox stayed with him at Castle Campbell. After the agreement of the barons, in December 1557, that the reformed preachers should teach in private houses till the government should allow them to preach in public, Archibald took on the protection of John Douglas, a Carmelite friar. To induce Archibald to renounce the reformed faith, John Hamilton, Archbishop of St. Andrews, sent him a long letter, to which he wrote a detailed answer.

Archibald Campbell died between 21 August 1558 and 2 December 1558 in Dulnynn, Scotland. He was buried at Kilmun Parish Church in Cowal, Scotland. Upon his death, he was succeeded by his son, also named Archibald Campbell.

== Family ==
Archibald Campbell was married three times. He was married firstly to Lady Helen Hamilton (died in or before 1541), daughter of James Hamilton, 1st Earl of Arran and Janet Bethune. They had a son:

- Archibald Campbell, 5th Earl of Argyll
- Lady Janet Campbell, who married
- Lady Agnes Campbell (born c. 1538)

Calvagh O'Donnell, Lord of Tyrconnell.

Archibald was married secondly to Lady Margaret Graham, daughter of William Graham, 3rd Earl of Menteith and Margaret Moubray, on 21 April 1541 at the Priory of Inchmahome. They had three children:

- Colin Campbell, 6th Earl of Argyll
- Lady Margaret Campbell (died February 1572) who married James Stewart, 1st Lord Doune at Castle Campbell in January 1563.
- Lady Jeanette (or Janet) Campbell, who married Hector Og Maclean, 9th of Duart.

Archibald was married thirdly to Catherine Maclean, daughter of Hector Mor Maclean, 8th of Duart and Mary MacDonald, on 12 March 1546. In 1561, she pledged a gold chain with Thomas Wallace, a tailor in Stirling, for a loan of 120 merks.

He had two other children who were illegitimate:

- Mary Campbell, who married Sir James Stewart of Ardmaleish, son of Ninian Stewart of Ardmaleish and Elizabeth Blair.
- Agnes Campbell (born illegitimately to Janet Gordon, daughter of Alexander Gordon, 3rd Earl of Huntly).

== Notes ==
Legal offices
| Preceded by The Earl of Argyll | Lord Justice General; 1529–1558 | Succeeded by The Earl of Argyll |
Peerage of Scotland
| Preceded by Colin Campbell | Earl of Argyll; 1529–1558 | Succeeded by Archibald Campbell |
