= Hector Mor Maclean, 12th Chief =

Scottish clan chief

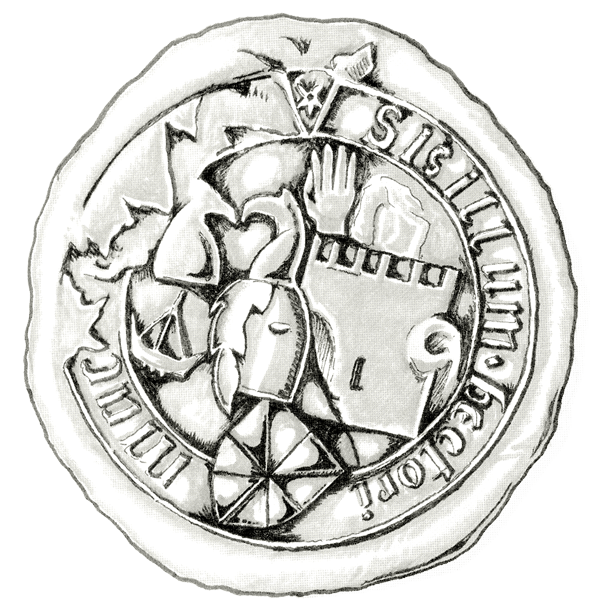
- Hector Mor Maclean, 12th Chief wax seal from 1545

12th Chief of Clan Maclean 8th Laird of Duart
- In office 1523-1568 (45 years)
- Preceded by: Lachlan Cattanach Maclean, 11th Chief, father
- Succeeded by: Hector Og Maclean, 13th Chief, son

Personal details
- Born: 1497 Duart Castle
- Died: 1568 (aged 70–71)

Eachann Mór Maclean (1497–1568) or Hector Mor Maclean, or Hector Maclean the Great, was the 12th Chief of Maclean. Mór or Mor translates as great when added to a name in Scottish Gaelic. He was the 8th laird of Duart Castle.

== Biography ==
He was born in 1497 in Scotland.

Lachlan Cattanach Maclean, 11th Chief was succeeded as Chieftain and Laird of Duart by his son Eachann, better known as Hector Mor Maclean, or Hector the Great, in 1527. In 1533 his Scottish galleys captured a large English ship, the Mary Willoughby, which then joined the navy of James V of Scotland.

He is described by the seanachaidhs as being good, kind, affectionate, and brave, an accomplished politician and an approved warrior; and that in him the clan realized all it desired in a noble chieftain. To most of his vassals he granted extended leases, by way of encouragement in the improvement of lands and the building of more comfortable dwellings. He lived altogether, while permitted to do so by his troublesome neighbors with which he was surrounded, more like a noble of modern times than a feudal baron. He made many improvements on the demesne of Duard; and was the founder of that noble addition, the Great Tower, to Duart Castle. His alliance was courted by many of the powerful lords; and the king thought it of importance to secure his loyalty by calling him into his council. Hence, we find him taking his seat in parliament as one of the lords of the kingdom. In private life his character was above reproach, and in his warlike pursuits he acted upon that system which had legal sanction.

Hector Mor Maclean died about the year 1568.

== Marriage and children ==
Hector Mor Maclean married Mary MacDonald of Islay and the Glens, daughter of Alexander MacDonald, 5th of Dunnyveg, by whom he had two sons and seven daughters:

- Hector Og Maclean, 13th Chief, his heir and successor.
- John Dubh Maclean of Morvern, predecessor of the family of Kinlochaline Castle.
- Marian Maclean, married to Norman MacLeod of Harris.
- Mary Maclean, married to Donald MacDonald of Sleat.
- Catherine Maclean I, died unmarried.
- Catherine Maclean II, was married four times: firstly to Archibald Campbell, 4th Earl of Argyll; secondly to Calvagh O'Donnell, Lord of Tyrconnell; thirdly to Shane O'Neill, Prince of Ulster; and fourthly to John Stewart of Appin. Catherine was a high-spirited woman, and was distinguished for her beauty and culture
- Giles (or Silis) Maclean, married to Tormod MacLeod, 13th Chief (c.1510 - c.1585). She died in 1568.
- Una Maclean, married to Cameron of Lochiel.
- Janet Maclean, married to Allan MacDonald, 9th of Clanranald.
