= Hector Og Maclean, 13th Chief =

Hector Og Maclean, 13th Clan Chief

13th Clan Chief 9th Laird of Duart
- In office 1568-1573 (5 years)
- Preceded by: Hector Mor Maclean, 12th Clan Chief
- Succeeded by: Sir Lachlan Mor Maclean, 14th Chief

Personal details
- Born: circa 1540
- Died: 1573
- Spouse(s): Janet Campbell, daughter of Archibald Campbell, 4th Earl of Argyll
- Children: Sir Lachlan Mor Maclean
- Parent: Hector Mor Maclean, 12th Clan Chief (father)
- Nickname(s): Eachuinn Og Maclean; Eachann Og Maclean (Gaelic); Hector Maclean the Younger; Hector the Younger

Hector Og Maclean, or Eachann Óg Maclean in Scottish Gaelic, or Hector Maclean the Younger (c. 1540–1573) was the 13th Chief of Clan MacLean. At the death of his father, Hector Mor Maclean, 12th Chief, he became clan chief but lived only five years longer than his father.

== Early years ==
He was born around 1540. At the death of his father, Hector Mor Maclean, 12th Chief, Hector Og became clan chief.

During which short period he not only spent, by his improvident conduct and profligacy, all the money left by the late noble chief, but burdened the estates with debt. He appears to have inherited nothing of the qualities which distinguished his father, but lived at peace in the free enjoyment of his pleasures. He was the only worthless chief of MacLean. He appears to have built for himself a residence at Iona, situated near the head of Port-a-Churraich, where traces of the house are extant.

== Marriage and children ==
Hector Og Maclean married Janet Campbell, daughter of the Archibald Campbell, 4th Earl of Argyll, in the year 1557 and had the following children:

- Sir Lachlan Mor Maclean, his heir and successor
- Mary Maclean, married to Angus MacDonald, 8th of Dunnyveg
- Janet Maclean, married to Roderick MacLeod of Lewis
- Marian Maclean, married to Hector Roy Maclean, 5th Laird of Coll

== Death ==
Hector died during the latter part of 1573, or the beginning of 1574.
