= Ainshval =

Coordinates: 56.96563°N 6.314678°W

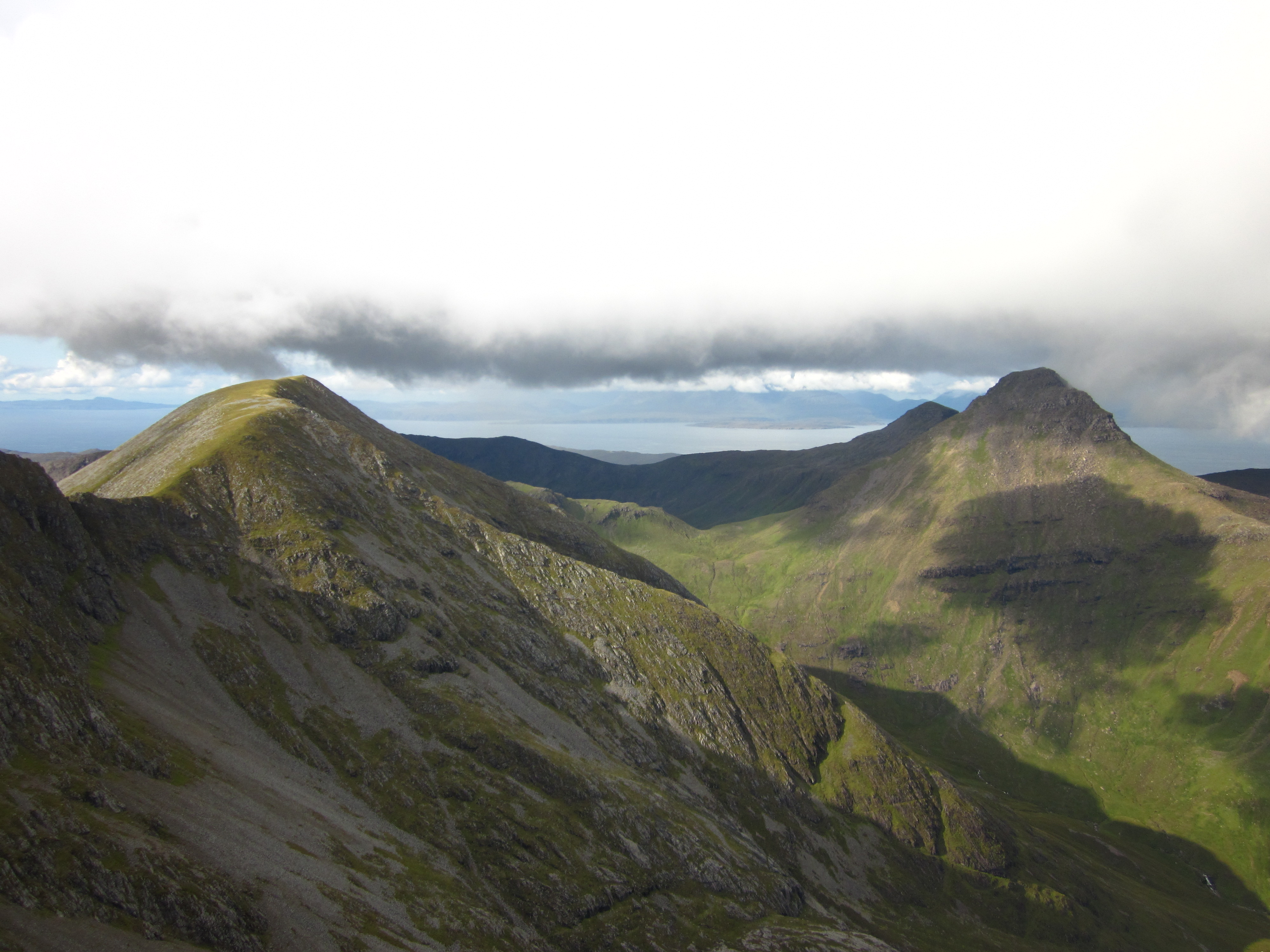
- Ainshval (left) with Askival on the right.

Highest point
- Elevation: 781 m (2,562 ft)
- Prominence: 326 m (1,070 ft)
- Parent peak: Askival
- Listing: Marilyn, Corbett

Naming
- Language of name: Norse

Geography
- Location: Rùm, Scotland
- Parent range: The Cuillin of Rum
- OS grid: NM378943
- Topo map: OS Landranger 39

Ainshval is the second highest mountain on the island of Rùm, in the Inner Hebrides of Scotland, after Askival.

It is part of the Rùm Cuillin, a range of rocky hills in the south of the island. The mountain is usually climbed as part of the classic travail of the Cuillin range
