= Rùm =

One of the Small Isles of the Inner Hebrides, in the district of Lochaber, Scotland

Rùm (Gaelic)
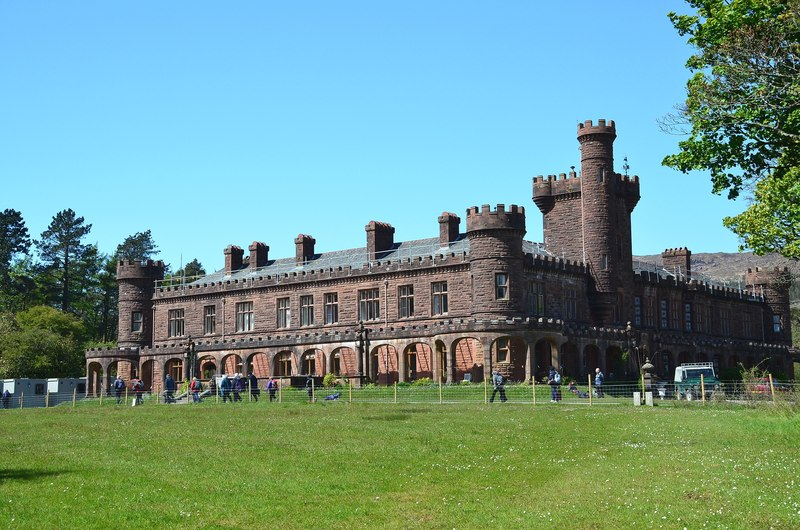
- Kinloch Castle

Location
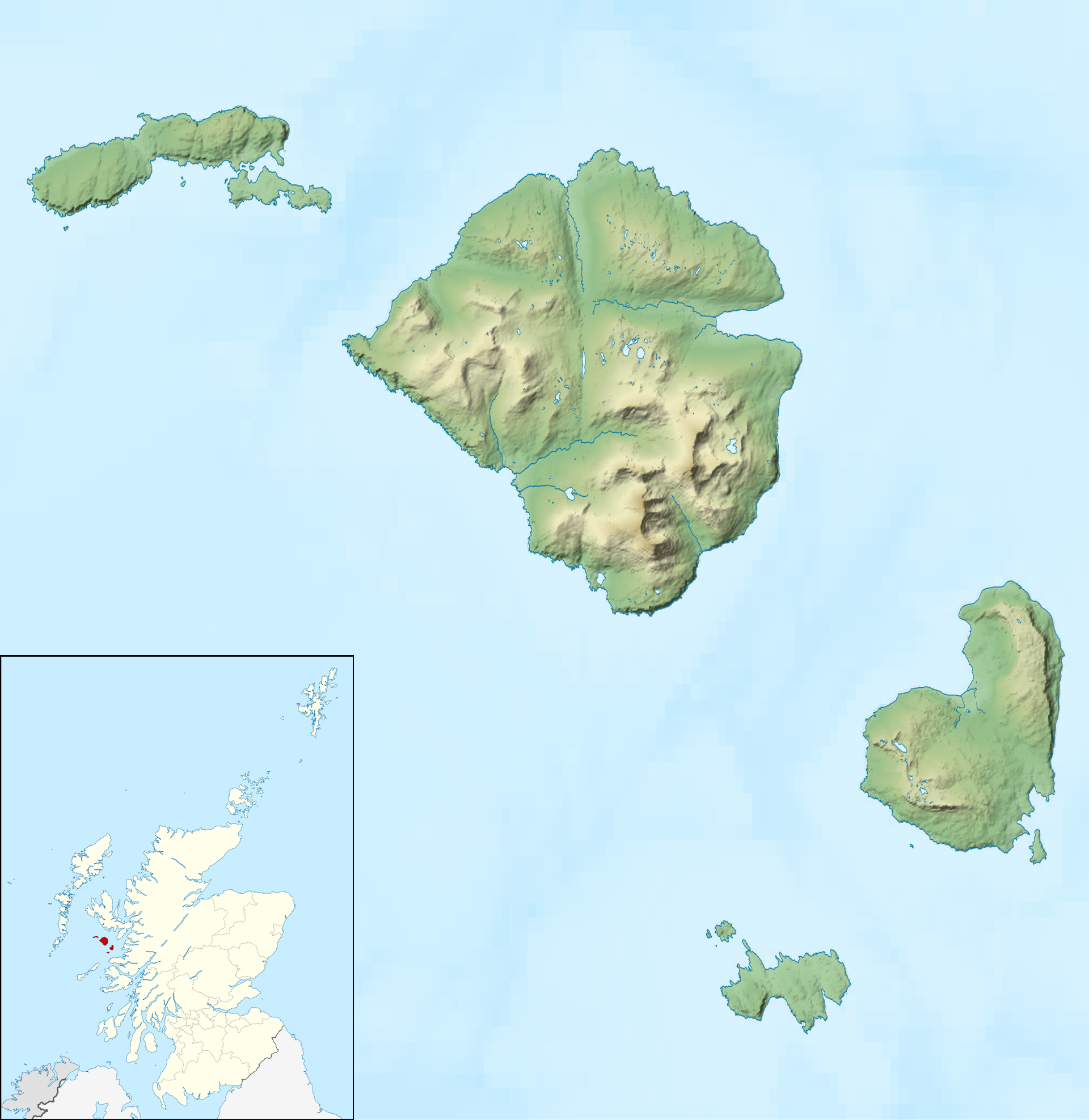
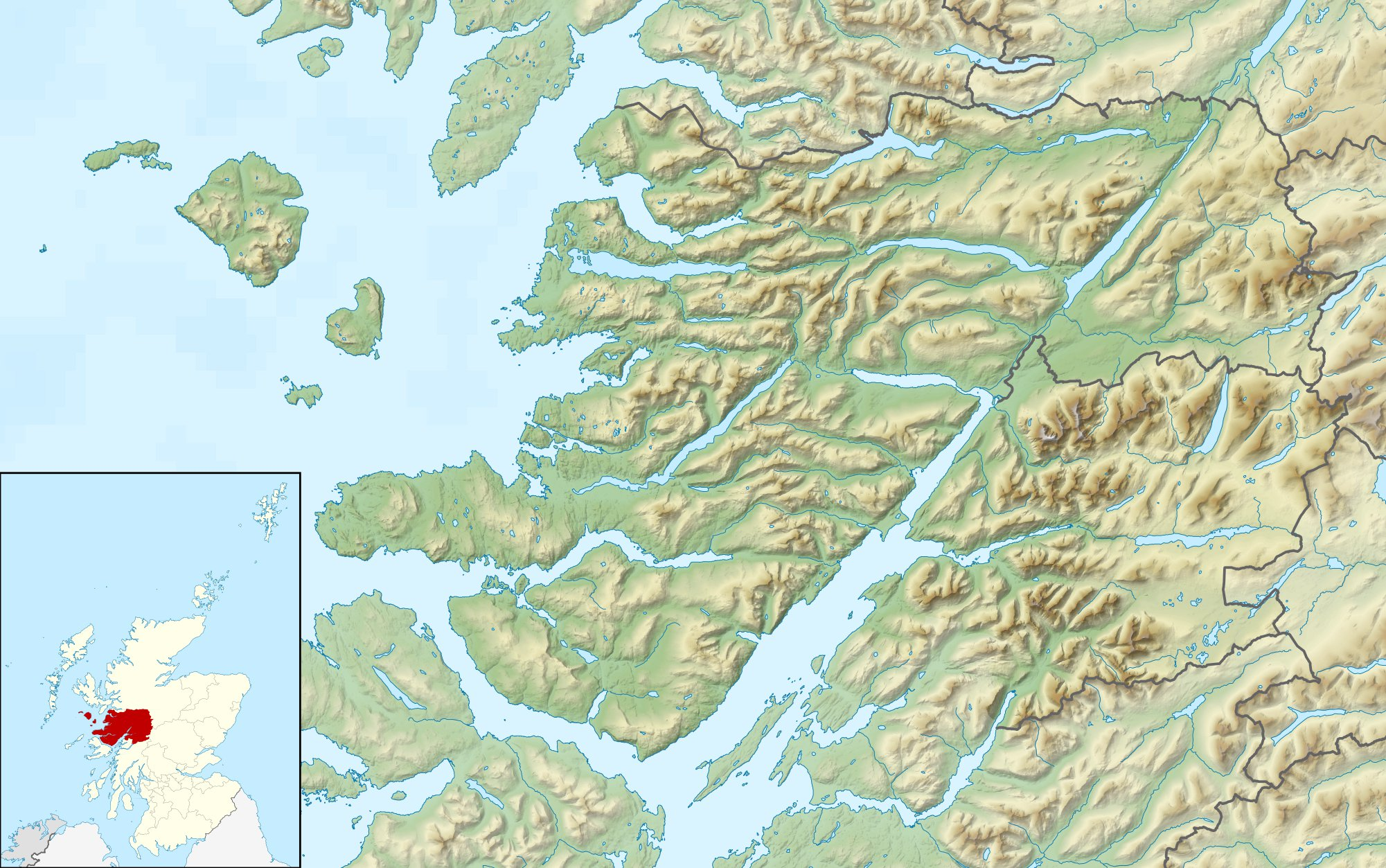
- Rùm shown within the Small Isles Rùm shown within Lochaber
- OS grid reference: NM360976
- Coordinates: 56.994°N 6.344°W

Name
- Name meaning: unclear
- Old Norse name: possibly rõm-øy

Physical geography
- Island group: Small Isles
- Area: 10,463 ha (40 3/8 sq mi)
- Area rank: 15
- Highest elevation: Askival, 812 m (2,664 ft)

Administration
- Council area: Highland
- Country: Scotland
- Sovereign state: United Kingdom

Demographics
- Population: 31
- Population rank: 56
- Population density: 0.3/km^{2} (0.8/sq mi)
- Largest settlement: Kinloch

Rùm (Scottish Gaelic pronunciation: [rˠuːm]), a Scottish Gaelic name often anglicised to Rum (/rʌm/ rum), is one of the Small Isles of the Inner Hebrides, off the west coast of Scotland, in the district of Lochaber. For much of the 20th century the name became Rhum, a spelling invented by the former owner, Sir George Bullough, because he did not relish the idea of having the title "Laird of Rum".

It is the largest of the Small Isles, and the 15th-largest Scottish island, and is inhabited by about 30 people, all of whom live in the hamlet of Kinloch on the east coast. The island has been inhabited since the 8th millennium BC and provides some of the earliest-known evidence of human occupation in Scotland. The early Celtic and Norse settlers left only a few written accounts and artefacts. From the 12th or 13th centuries the island was held by various clans, including the MacLeans of Coll. The population had grown to more than 400 by the late 18th century, but the island was cleared of its indigenous population between 1826 and 1828. The island then became a sporting estate; the exotic Kinloch Castle was constructed by the Bulloughs in 1900. Rùm was purchased by the Nature Conservancy Council in 1957.

Rùm is mainly igneous in origin, and its mountains were eroded by Pleistocene glaciation. It is now an important study site for research in ecology, especially of red deer, and is the site of a successful reintroduction programme for the white-tailed sea eagle. Its economy is entirely dependent on NatureScot, a public body that now manages the island, and there have been calls for a greater diversity of housing provision. A Caledonian MacBrayne ferry links the island with the mainland town of Mallaig.

In 2024 the island was designated an International Dark Sky Sanctuary, the first in Scotland and the second in Europe.

== Toponyms ==
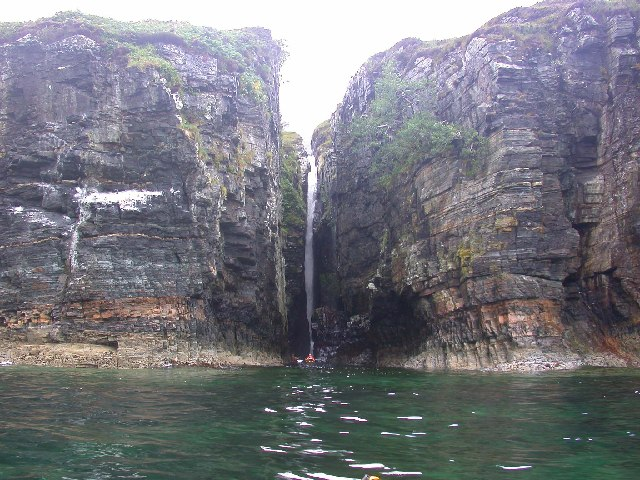
Coastal waterfall

Haswell-Smith (2004) suggests that Rum is "probably" pre-Celtic but may be Old Norse rõm-øy for 'wide island' or Gaelic ì-dhruim (pronounced [iˈɣɾɯim]) meaning 'isle of the ridge'. Ross (2007) notes that there is a written record of Ruim from 677 and suggests 'spacious island' from the Gaelic rùm. Mac an Tàilleir (2003) is unequivocal that Rùm is "a pre-Gaelic name and unclear". In light of this, Richard Coates has suggested that it may be worth looking for a Proto-Semitic source for the name. This is because the British Isles were likely repopulated from the Iberian Peninsula following the last Ice Age. He proposes a name based on the Proto-Semitic root *rwm, a 'height-word' as seen in Ramat Gan in Israel and Ramallah, Palestine. Rum would therefore mean something like '(island of) height' or 'high island'.

The origins are therefore speculative, but it is known for certain that George Bullough changed the spelling to Rhum to avoid the association with the alcoholic drink rum. However the Rhum spelling is used on a Kilmory gravestone dated 1843. In 1991 the Nature Conservancy Council of Scotland (the forerunner to NatureScot) reverted to the use of Rum without the h.

In the 13th century there may be references to the island as Raun-eyja and Raun-eyjum, and Dean Munro writing in 1549 calls it Ronin. Seafaring Hebrideans had numerous taboos concerning spoken references to islands. In the case of Rùm, use of the usual name was forbidden, the island being referred to as Rìoghachd na Forraiste Fiadhaich, 'the kingdom of the wild forest'.

The island was cleared of its indigenous population prior to being mapped by the Ordnance Survey, so it is possible that many place names are speculative. Nonetheless, the significant number of Norse-derived names that exist eight centuries after Viking political control ended indicate the importance of their presence on the island. Of the nine hamlets that were mapped in 1801, seven of the names are of Norse origin.

== Geography ==
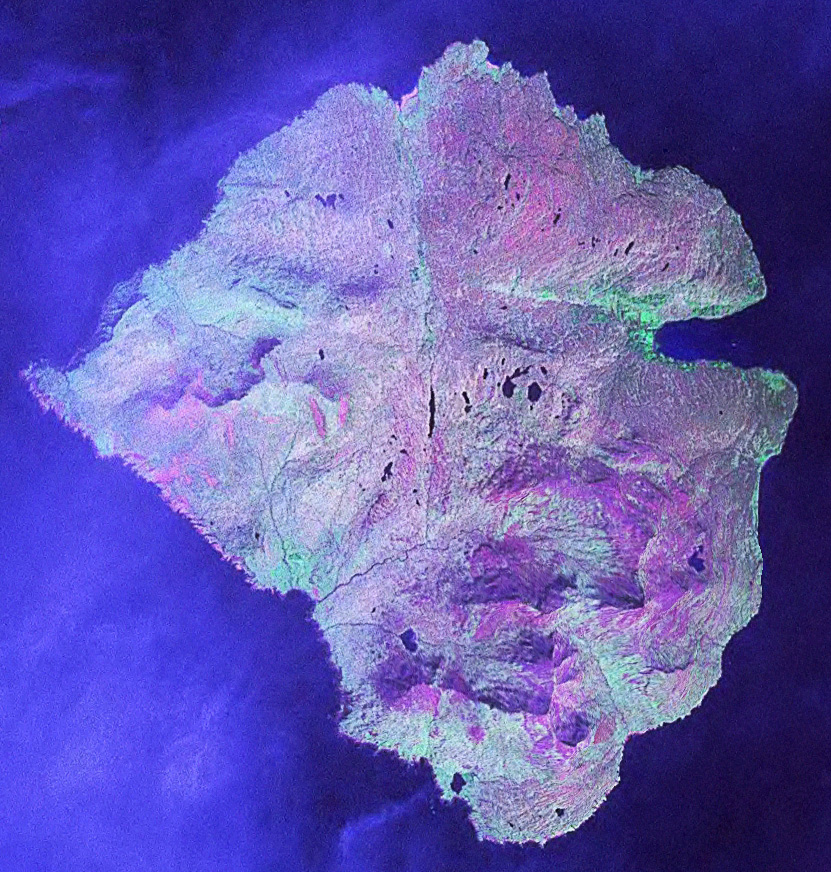
Landsat satellite view of Rùm

Rùm is the largest of the Small Isles, with an area of 10,463 hectares (25,850 acres).

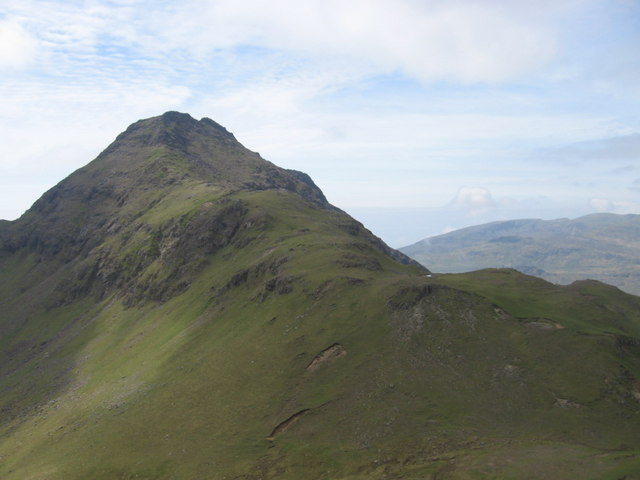
Trollaval

Kinloch is at the head of Loch Scresort, the main anchorage. Kilmory Bay lies to the north. It has a fine beach and the remains of a village, and has for some years served as the base for research into red deer (see below). The area is occasionally closed to visitors during the period of the deer rut in the autumn. The western point is the A' Bhrìdeanach peninsula, and to the southwest lie Wreck Bay, the cliffs of Sgorr Réidh and Harris Bay. The last is the site of the Bullough's mausoleum. The family decided the first version was inadequate and dynamited it. The second is in the incongruous style of a Greek temple. Papadil (Old Norse: "valley of the hermit") near the southern extremity has the ruins of a lodge built and then abandoned by the Bulloughs.

An 1801 map produced by George Langlands identified nine villages: Kilmory to the north at the head of Glen Kilmory, Samhnan Insir just to the north between Kilmory and Rubha Samhnan Insir, Camas Pliasgiag in the northeast, "Kinlochscresort", (the modern Kinloch), Cove (Laimhrige at Bàgh na h-Uamha in the east), Dibidil in the southeast, Papadil in the south, Harris in the southwest and Guirdil at the head of Glen Shellesder in the northwest.

The island's relief is spectacular; a 19th-century commentator remarked that "the interior is one heap of rude mountains, scarcely possessing an acre of level land". This combination of geology and topography makes for less than ideal agricultural conditions, and it is doubtful that more than one tenth of the island has ever been cultivated. In the 18th century, average land-rental values on Rùm were a third those of neighbouring Eigg and only a fifth of Canna's.

Mean annual rainfall is high at 1,800 mm (71 in) at the coast and 3,000 mm (120 in) in the hills. Spring months are usually the driest and winter the wettest, but any month may receive the highest level of precipitation during the year.

== Geology ==
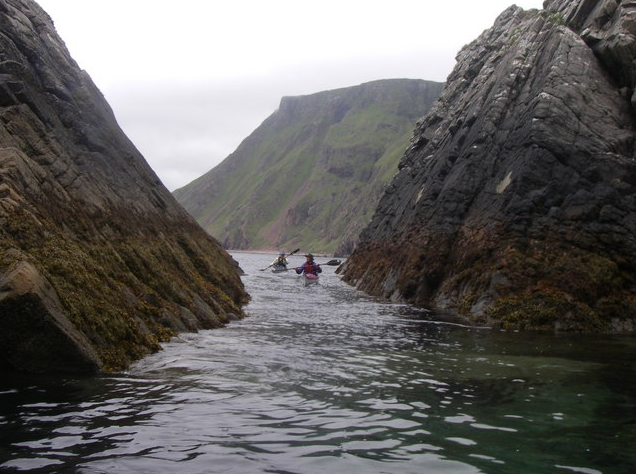
The west coast looking from A' Bhrideanach point towards Bloodstone Hill

The main range of hills on Rùm are the Cuillin, usually referred to as the "Rùm Cuillin", in order to distinguish them from the Cuillin of Skye. They are rocky peaks of gabbro, forming the Rum layered intrusion. Geologically, Rùm is the core of a deeply eroded volcano that was active in the Paleogene period some 60 million years ago, and which developed on a pre-existing structure of Torridonian sandstone and shales resting on Lewisian gneiss. Two of the Cuillin are classified as Corbetts: Askival and Ainshval, (Old Norse for "mountain of the ash trees" and "hill of the strongholds" respectively) and Rùm is the smallest Scottish island to have a summit above 762 metres (2,500 ft). Other hills include Hallival, Trollaval ('mountain of the trolls'), Barkeval, and Sgurr nan Gillean (Gaelic: "peak of the young men") in the Cuillin and Ard Nev, Orval, Sròn an t-Saighdeir and Bloodstone Hill in the west. It is likely that only the higher peaks remained above the Pleistocene ice sheets as nunataks.

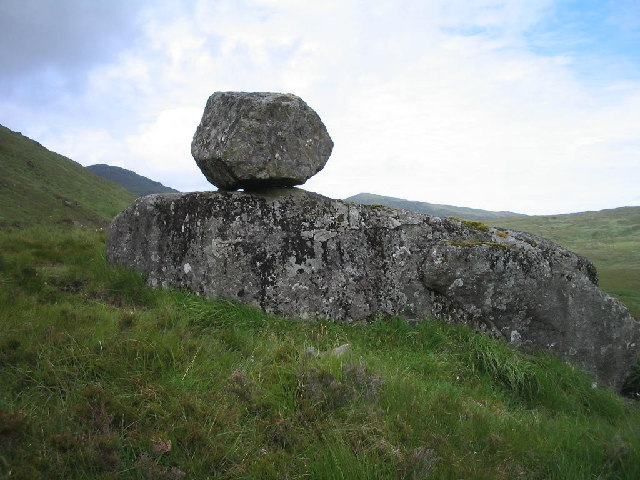
Deposits from the ice age

Hallival and Askival are formed from an extraordinary series of layered igneous rocks created as olivine and feldspar crystals accumulated at the base of a magma chamber. The chamber eventually collapsed, forming a caldera. There are swarms of near-vertical dykes of basalt on the northwest coast between Kilmory and Guirdil, created by basaltic magma forcing its way into fissures in the pre-existing rock. The western hills, although less elevated than the Cuillin, exhibit a superb collection of periglacial landforms including boulder sheets and lobes, turf-banked terraces, ploughing boulders and patterned ground. On Orval and Ard Nev the weathered basalt and granophyre has been sorted by frost heaving into circles 50 centimetres in diameter and weathering on Barkeval has produced unusual rock sculptures. On Sròn an t-Saighdeir there are large sorted granite boulder circles 2–3 metres across on the flat summit and sorted stripes on the slopes. Lava flowing away from the volcanic centre formed Bloodstone Hill, gas bubbles leaving holes in the structure that were then filled with green agate flecked with red. There are some outcrops of the pre-volcanic Lewisian gneiss near Dibidil in the southeast corner of the island, and more extensive deposits of sandstone in the north and east.

== History ==
=== Prehistory ===
A site near Kinloch known as Farm Fields provides some of the earliest known evidence of human occupation in Scotland. Carbonized hazelnut shells found there have been dated to the Mesolithic period at 7700-7500 BC. (Note: At the time of its discovery, the site at Farm Fields was considered to be the earliest evidence in Scotland. In 2004, however the remains of a large camp were found at Cramond in West Lothian, dated to 8500 BC, fully a millennium earlier than the Rùm site. See "The Megalithic Portal and Megalith Map: Rubbish dump reveals time-capsule of Scotland's earliest settlements". megalithic.co.uk.); at this time the landscape was dominated by alder, hazel and willow scrub. A beach site above Loch Scresort has been dated to between 6500 and 5500 BC. The presence of this hunter-gatherer community may have been to take advantage of the local supplies of bloodstone, a workable material for the making of tools and weapons. There is a shell-midden at Papadil in the south and evidence of tidal fish traps at both Kinloch and Kilmory.

Examination of peat cores and pollen records indicates that soil erosion (suggesting clearance of woodland for agricultural purposes) was taking place in 3470 BC (the early Neolithic era); much later, from 2460 BC, evidence of arable cultivation exists. As the climate became damper, peat expanded its coverage at the expense of woodland, and post-glacial sea level changes left raised beaches around the coastline 18–45 metres above the present sea-level, especially between Harris and A'Bhrideanach; Bronze Age artefacts, such as barbed-and-tanged arrowheads typical of the Beaker People, have been found in the machair which replaced it (Note: found by a schoolboy in 1964, at Samhnan Insir, when winds exposed them).

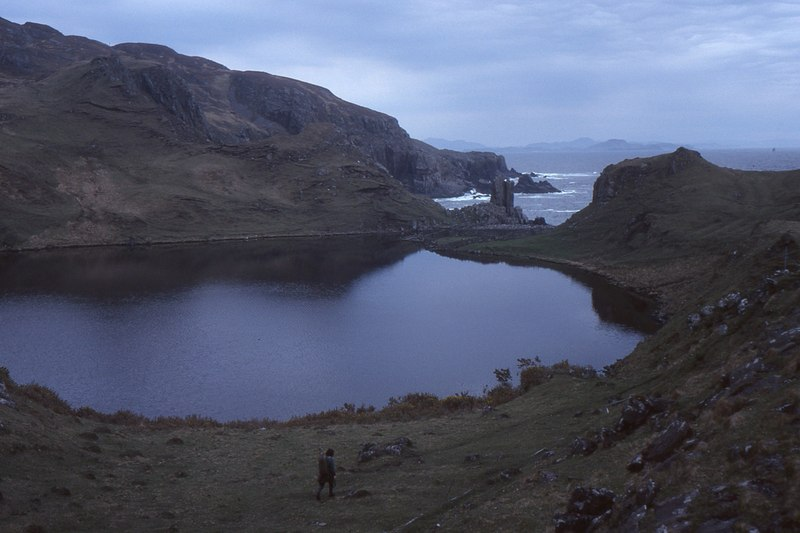
Loch Papadil. The promontory fort is to the right (Note: the castle-like structure in the centre of the image is a natural rock formation, the Papadil Pinnacle)

There are prehistoric fort sites at promontories near Kilmory, Papadil and Glen Shellesder of uncertain date. These primarily consist of a wall dividing the promontory from the rest of the island, but at Kilmory, there is also a rampart with a hollow containing the traces of an interior structure. At Shellesder, the promontory contains the remains of three round stone-walled huts, one of which integrates with the dividing wall. A small number of cairns, again of uncertain date, are also located along the coast (Note: at Carn-an-dobhrain Bhig, at A' Bhrideanach, at Guirdil (this one is badly damaged), and near Kilmory. A cairn-like mound to the south of Harris may also be a cairn, though it could also be a natural formation).

=== Early Medieval Period ===
In the sixth and seventh centuries, Irish missionary activity led by Columba established a Christian presence in the region. Beccan of Rùm (previously a monk at Iona) may have lived on the island (at Papadil), for four decades from 632, his death being recorded in the Annals of Ulster in 677. He is known to have been conservative on doctrinal matters and surviving examples of his poetry suggest a passionate personality. He wrote of Columba:

In scores of curraghs with an army of wretches he crossed the long-haired sea.
He crossed the wave-strewn wild region,
Foam flecked, seal-filled, savage, bounding, seething, white-tipped, pleasing, doleful.

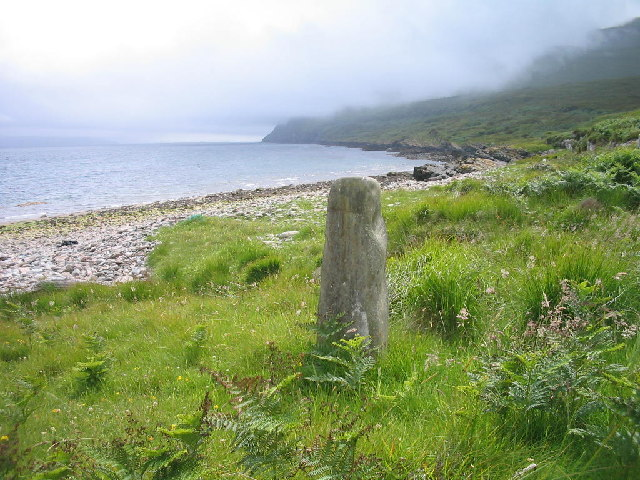
The inscribed pillar near Bàgh na h-Uamha

Simple stone pillars, over 1.4 metres (4 1/2 feet) tall, have been found at Kilmory and Bàgh na h-Uamha ("bay of the cave"), and may date from this period. The latter pillar in particular is inscribed with a slim cross having strong similarities to a motif in the late 6th century Cathach of St. Columba. The other pillar – at Kilmory – is slimmer (being 230 mm or 9 in wide, rather than 410 mm or 1 ft 4 in), but is inscribed with a more elaborate design, resembling a globus cruciger sitting in a chalice; on the back is a simple Latin Cross.

=== Scandinavian settlement ===
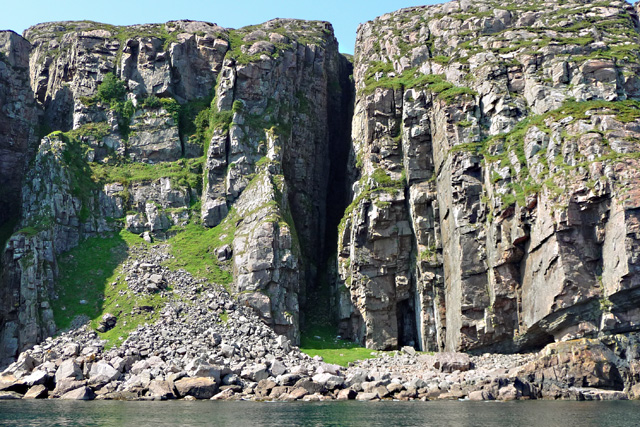
Deeply fractured coastline

From 833, Norse settlers established the Kingdom of the Isles throughout the Hebrides. Despite being a dependency of the Norwegian king, practical authority rested with the MacSorley, following a revolt by their ancestor, Somerled; the strip from Uist to the Rough Bounds, which contained the Small Isles, was ruled by the MacRory branch of the MacSorley. The only archaeological evidence of a Norse presence on Rùm, to date, is a piece of carved narwhal ivory (Note: unearthed at Bagh na h-Uamh in 1940), dating from the MacRory era, which served as a playing token / draughtsman (Note: it is now stored at the Edinburgh Royal Museum).

=== Scottish control ===
In 1266, the Treaty of Perth transferred the Kingdom of the Isles to the Scottish king. At the turn of the century, William I had created the position of Sheriff of Inverness, to be responsible for the Scottish highlands, which theoretically now extended to Garmoran; nevertheless, the treaty expressly preserved the power of local rulers, turning the MacRory lands into the Lordship of Garmoran, a quasi-independent crown dependency, rather than an intrinsic part of Scotland.

After nearly a century, the sole MacRory heir was Amy of Garmoran, who married John of Islay, leader of the MacDonalds, the most powerful branch of the MacSorley. A decade later, John put his faithful wife Amy aside to marry Princess Margaret, thus depriving his eldest son, Ranald, of the inheritance of the lordship and those MacDonald lands. As compensation, John granted the Lordship of the Uists to Ranald's younger brother Godfrey, and made Ranald Lord of the remainder of Garmoran, including Rùm.

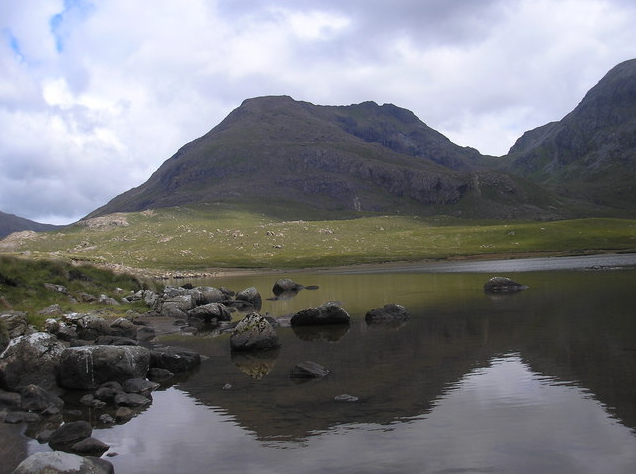
Loch Fiachanis in the interior, looking towards the Cuillin

In 1380, shortly after it was acquired by Ranald, John of Fordun indicates that Rùm was "a wooded and hilly island" "with excellent sport, but few inhabitants". It is possible that during the early medieval period the island was used as a hunting reserve by the nobility; in Gaelic it was referred to as Rìoghachd na Forraiste Fiadhaich — 'the kingdom of the wild forest'.

However, on Ranald's death, Godfrey seized Garmoran, leading to an enormous amount of violence between him and Ranald's heirs (Clan Ranald) (Note: Though surviving records reference the level of violence, they don't describe it in detail). In 1427, frustrated with the level of violence, King James I demanded that highland leaders should attend a meeting at Inverness. On arrival, many of the leaders were seized and imprisoned; some were killed. After a quick show trial of Godfrey's heir (Note: his son, Alexander MacGorrie), and in view of Clan Ranald being no less responsible for the violence, King James killed Alexander MacGorrie and declared the Lordship of Garmoran forfeit.

=== Early modern period ===
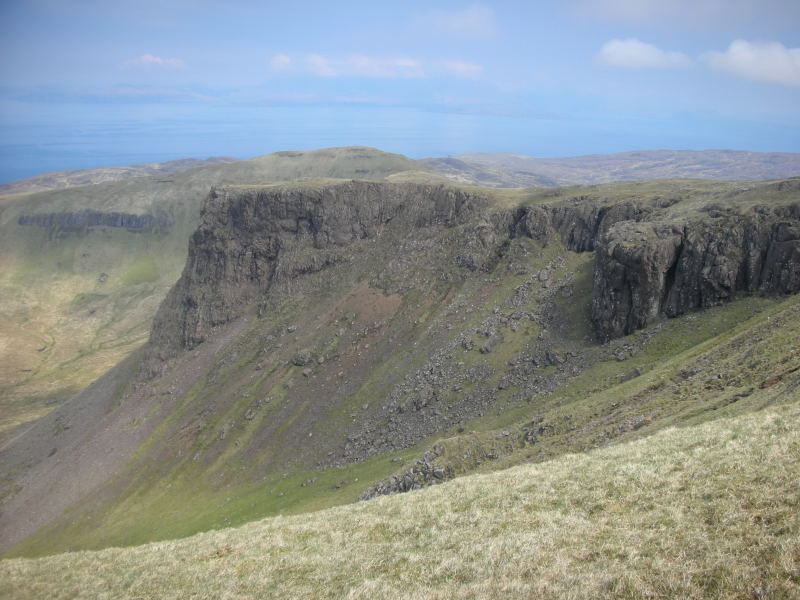
The slopes of Orval

Following the forfeiture, most of Garmoran remained with the Scottish crown until 1469, when James III granted Lairdship of it to John of Ross, the new MacDonald leader, who passed it to his own half-brother, Hugh of Sleat. Clan Ranald objected to the transfer to Hugh, and appear to have retained some level of physical possession, regardless of whether they any legal authority to do so (Note: traditionally referred to as holding lands by the sword). The status of Rùm during this period is unclear, as surviving records do not mention it as part of Hugh's possessions.

Alexander, the previous MacDonald leader, had made land grants to the eldest and youngest sons of Lachlan MacLean, grandson of Alexander's aunt (Note: As leader of the MacLeans, Lachlan's second son – the eldest lawful son – stood to inherit the MacLean lands, but the other sons lacked any inheritance, until granted some by Alexander). John Garbh (the youngest son) now obtained Rùm (possibly, Alexander had quitclaimed it to him); like Hugh's gains, Clan Ranald objected to this transfer. Traditional accounts claim that John Garbh purchased a quitclaim of Clan Ranald rights from their leader, Allan (Note: surnamed MacDonald, but often known as Allan MacRuari, after his father, Ruari (rather than his ancestral family, the MacRuadhri/MacRory)), by giving them a galley; though the galley looked in good quality, the interior (so the legend says) was rotten, hence explaining Clan Ranald's refusal to accept John Garbh's ownership of Rùm. John Garbh subsequently seized Allan, and held him prisoner on Coll for 9 months; presumably Allan was only released once he had agreed to acknowledge the exchange.

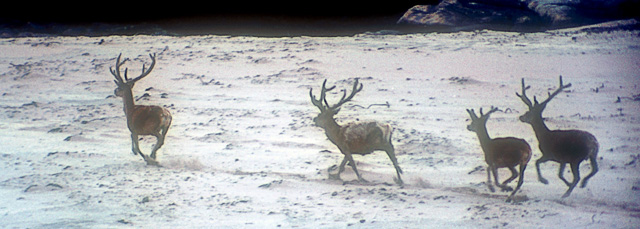
Red deer on Kilmory Beach

In 1493, John Garbh's heirs (the MacLeans of Coll) became direct vassals of the king, as a result of John MacDonald's realm becoming forfeit. This brought them into conflict with the heirs of John Garbh's elder brother (the MacLeans of Duart), who believed themselves to be the leaders of all MacLeans. In 1549 Donald Munro, conducting a survey, noted that although the island "pertained" to Coll it "obeys instantlie" to Duart, a situation that continued for some time.

Munro also reported that, at the time, Rùm was highly forested, with an abundance of deer. Munro goes on to argue that the best way of slaying the deer would be when they are moving uphill (when gravity is against them), their principal home being in the heights. Contemporary with Munro, substantial stone walls were built in the glens to funnel deer into pens (Note: still existent in the western glens).

When Lachlan Mor became leader of the MacLeans of Duart, he pursued the feud with vigour. In 1588, he had the fortune for some remains of the Spanish Armada to arrive in his lands (Mull); Lachlan offered them refuge in return for a supply of 100 soldiers. So it was that in 1588 Lachlan Mor attacked the Small Isles with the aid of Spaniards, and slaughtered its population, sparing neither women nor children. Rùm's character as a hunting reserve, and the low numbers of its former population, meant that there was little long-term impact, once Rùm was repopulated. A contemporary, Skene, noted that

Romb is ane Ile of small profit, except that it conteins mony deir, and for sustentation thairof the same is permittit unlabourit, except twa townis. It is... all hillis and waist glennis, and commodious only for hunting of deir... and will raise 6 or 7 men. (Note: English translation from Lowland Scots: "Rum is an isle of small profit, except that it contains many deer, and to sustain them they are free to roam, except for two villages. It is... all hills and waste valleys, and commodious only for hunting of deer... and will raise 6 or 7 men (for war).")

The king imprisoned Lachlan (in Edinburgh) for his actions (Note: the offence was the use of Spaniards, not the violence and arson), but he escaped, and faced no further punishment (Note: due to the king's status as Elizabeth I of England's heir, and Elizabeth's desire for the MacLeans to assist her against Irish rebels, wider considerations may have been at play here). A later report for the king indicated that the island was repopulated by members of Clan Ranald

=== Religious changes ===
The MacLeans of Rùm and of Duart were mild supporters of the Scottish Reformation, remaining Episcopalian, rather than becoming Presbyterian, and consequently the Roman Catholic church thought them susceptible to re-conversion. In 1622, the Irish church sent Cornelius Ward (Note: In gaelic, his name is Conchobhair mac-an-Bháird), a Franciscan friar, to bring Roman Catholicism back into the MacLean lands. Arriving on Rùm in 1625, Cornelius reported that it only had three villages; a few decades earlier the much smaller nearby island of Muck was recorded as having twice as many able men, suggesting that Rùm's population had been deliberately constrained.

Cornelius had no luck with the MacLean leadership, who remained Episcopalian, but the (small) population of Rùm does appear to have become Roman Catholic again. In the rest of the nation, Covenanters gradually gained political control. Coll (along with the lands of the MacLeans of Duart) was under the shrieval authority of the sheriff of Argyll; under pressure from the Earl of Argyll, one of the most powerful Covenanter leaders, shrieval authority over Rùm was transferred from Inverness to the Argyll sheriff, which was under the control of the Earl's family.

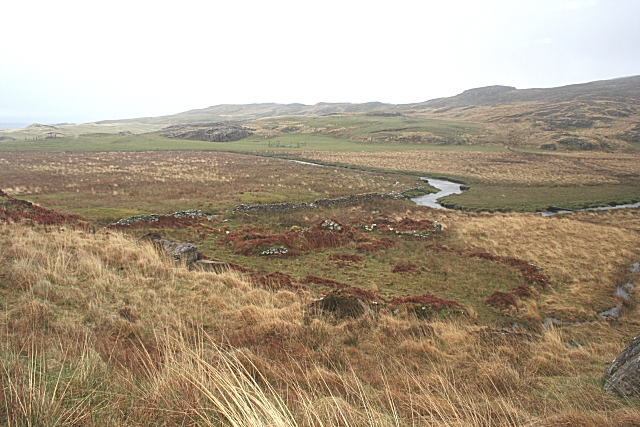
Open expanse, near Kilmory, historically the main settlement

In later generations, the lairds themselves became Presbyterian, preventing the island from becoming involved in the Jacobite risings, but it did ultimately bring a minor dispute to the island. In 1726, Presbyterianism was established in Rùm, quickly taking hold of the island's population (there were only around 150 people living on Rùm at the time). Nevertheless, Rùm had no permanent Protestant minister, and when one visited, he was obliged to conduct sermons in the open air, there being no church building.

Half a century later, when visiting the wider region, Dr. Johnson was told that the laird (Note: who would have been Lachlan MacLean) had hit one of the tenants across the back with a gold-tipped cane, as punishment for going to Roman Catholic mass, threatening the same treatment for any others who did so. The Roman Catholic population of Eigg, an adjacent island, facetiously called Rùm's Protestantism The Religion of the Yellow Stick.

=== Population expansion ===
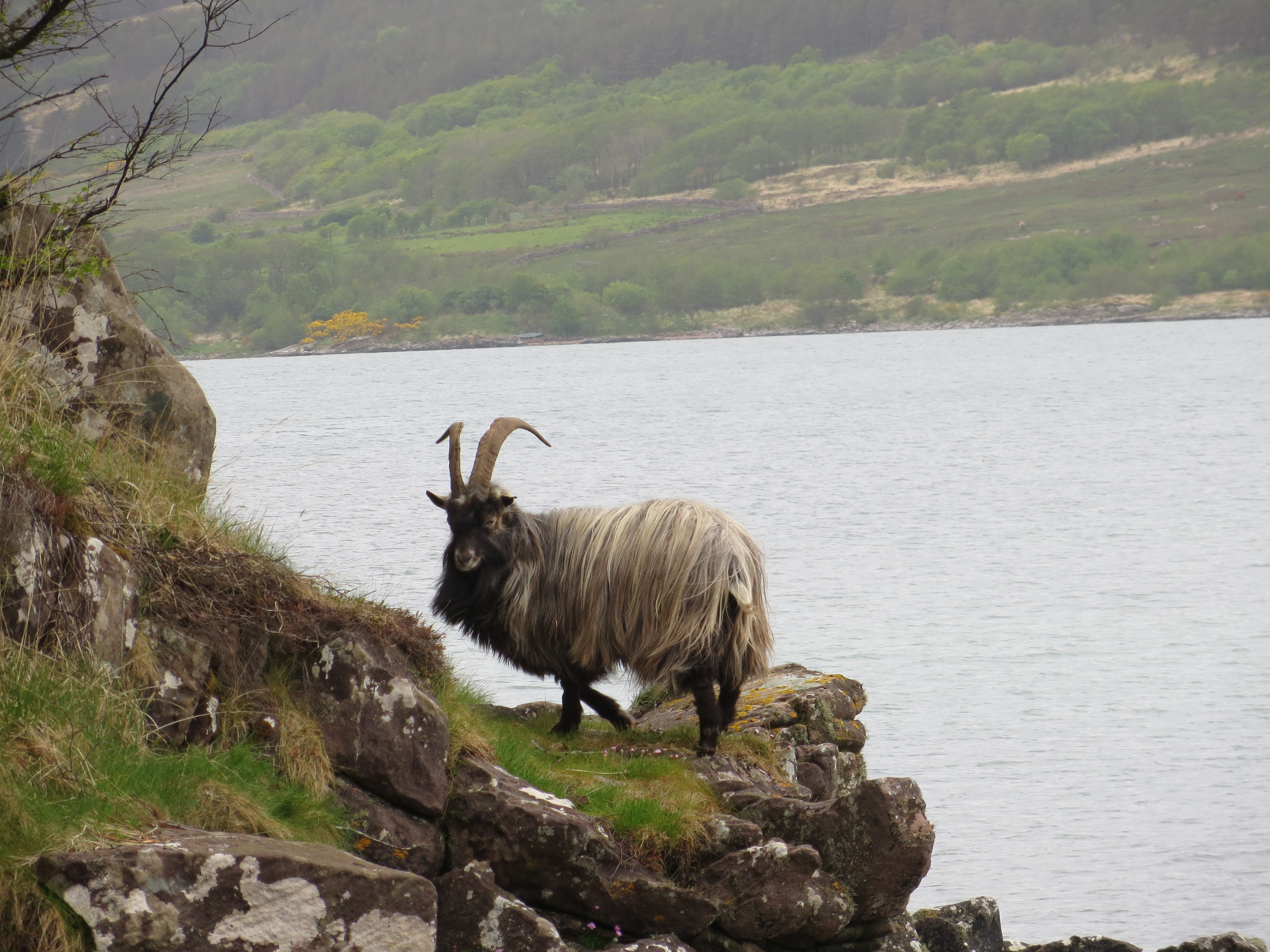
Mountain goat at Loch Scresort

The introduction of the potato as a food crop, in the 18th century, led to a rapid expansion of demand for arable land, which the populace also planted with barley. The increased health and fecundity this brought, and the lack of further wars, led to a population expansion; by 1801 there were nine hamlets on the island.

In turn, the increased demand for work led to new sources of income. Black cattle were raised for export to the mainland, and (more unusually) goats were kept by the inhabitants, the hair being sent to Glasgow and made into wigs for export to America. The economy was in no small part dependent on the bounty of the sea; Edward Clarke, visiting in 1797 dined on:

....milk, oatcakes and Lisbon wine. I was surprised to find wine of that species, and of a superior quality in such a hut, but they told us it was part of the freight of some unfortunate vessel wrecked near the island.

However, local agriculture was comparatively primitive, and the lack of lime restricted the ability to tan leather, or construct sophisticated buildings; the island was no more valuable than the much smaller island of Muck. Furthermore, the new demands on the land had reduced the great forest island to an essentially treeless landscape (Note: except for Kinloch village); by the end of the century, this had caused the extinction of the native red deer (Cervus elaphus).

The increase in the price of kelp (Note: A source of valuable minerals, like soda ash), as a result of the Napoleonic Wars (Note: which limited foreign supplies), was the only thing keeping Rùm's economy afloat. Inevitably, when the Napoleonic Wars ended, the kelp price collapsed, causing severe financial hardship. The laird himself was in additional difficulties as a result of having purchased the Isle of Muck during the peak of demand for kelp. He decided to evict the tenants, and lease the whole island to a relative, Dr Lachlan Maclean.

=== Depopulation ===
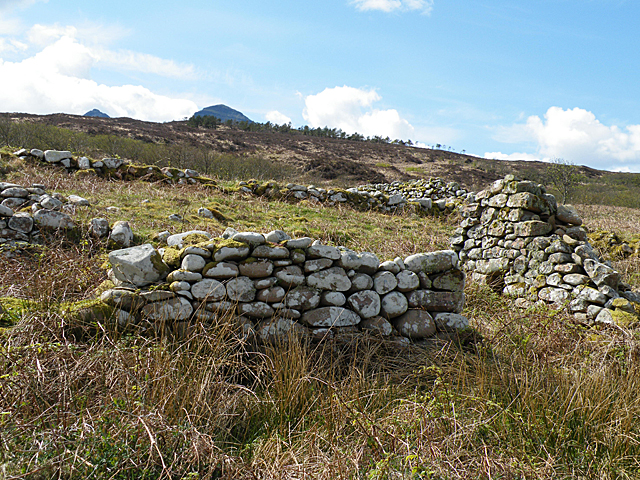
Ruins of a village on Rùm

In keeping with the Highland Clearances that had swept Scotland since the 1750s, in 1825 the inhabitants of Rùm (then numbering some 450 people) were given a year's notice to quit (Note: comparatively generous by the standards of other highland clearances). The inhabitants of Rùm had simply been tenant farmers, paying rent to the laird; they owned neither the land they worked, nor the houses in which they lived. On 11 July 1826, about 300 of the inhabitants boarded two overcrowded ships (Note: the Highland Lad and the Dove of Harmony) bound for Cape Breton in Nova Scotia (Note: Now part of Canada). The laird, and Dr Lachlan, paid for their journey. The remaining population followed in 1827 (Note: on the St. Lawrence, which also transported some 150 inhabitants from Muck). Similar evictions happened all over the Gaelic-speaking parts of Scotland, and collectively became known as the Highland Clearances. Harris was the largest settlement in the 18th century, which was cleared. It had 37 buildings.

In 1827, when giving evidence to a government select committee on emigration, an agent of the laird was asked "And were the people willing to go?"; "Some of them", came the reply, "Others were not very willing, they did not like to leave the land of their ancestors". Years later an eyewitness, a local shepherd, was more florid in his description of the events: "The people of the island were carried off in one mass, for ever, from the sea-girt spot where they were born and bred... The wild outcries of the men and heart-breaking wails of the women and children filled all the air between the mountainous shore of the bay".

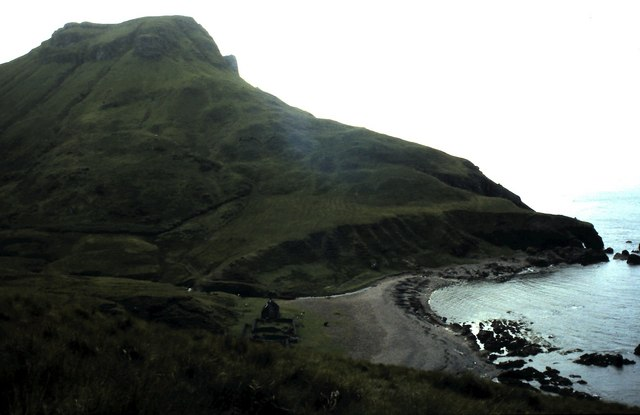
A shepherd's bothy (Note: by the beach), in a remote part of Rùm

Lachlan turned Rùm into a sheep farm, with its population replaced by some 8,000 blackface sheep. So total had been the clearance that he was forced to import families to the island to act as shepherds (Note: He chose families being evicted from Skye and MacLean lands in Mull). However, the prosperity elsewhere in the UK led to traditional staples like mutton and wool being of less interest to consumers, and their price fell. In 1839 the price of mutton fell dramatically, bankrupting Dr Lachlan, and forcing him to leave. Ironically, in the words of one of the émigrés, Dr Lachlan, "the Curse and Scourge of the Highland Crofters [was now] much worse off than the comfortable people he turned out of Rùm 13 years previously".

In 1844 the visiting geologist Hugh Miller, wrote:

The single sheep farmer who had occupied the holdings of so many had been unfortunate in his speculations, and had left the island: the proprietor, his landlord seemed to have been as little fortunate as his tenant, for the island itself was in the market; and a report went current at the time that it was on the eve of being purchased by some wealthy Englishman, who purposed converting it into a deer forest. How strange a cycle!

=== Multiple island owners ===
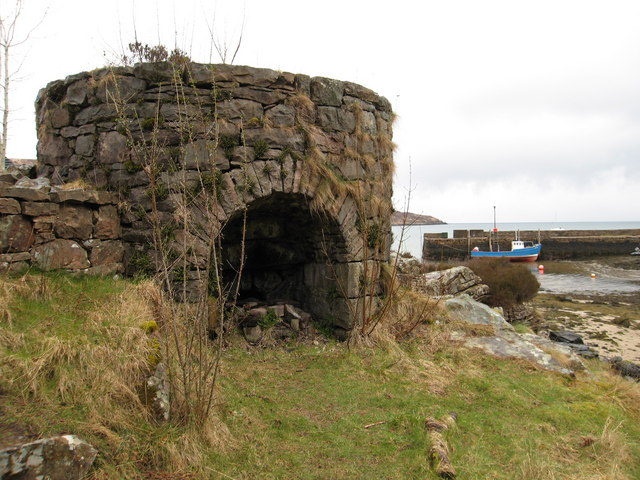
Salisbury's lime-kiln

In 1845, the MacLean laird sold the island to the Marquess of Salisbury, who converted Rùm into an estate for country sports. The Marquis first built a pier at Kinloch, and adjacent limekiln, to help with this process, re-introducing deer, both Red and Fallow. He then passed the land to his son, Viscount Cranbourne, who was more interested in fishing.

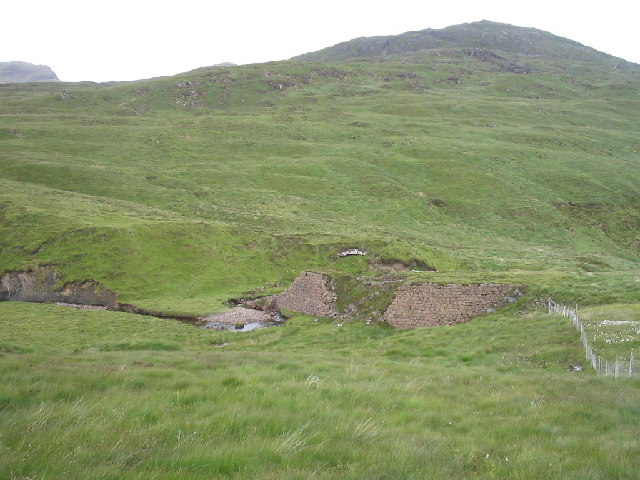
Salisbury's dam

The main rivers of Rùm were essentially just trickling streams, so Cranbourne came up with a plan to increase the power of the Kinloch River, by diverting the other two. In 1849, he built a dam at the end of Loch Sgathaig, allowing him to diverting the overflow into the Kilmory River (northwards), rather than the Abhainn Rhangail (southwards). In 1852, he attempted to dam the Kilmory River, half a mile north of Loch Sgathaig, the plan being to send the overflow into the Kinloch River via a short canal; unfortunately Salisbury's Dam collapsed shortly after being built.

In 1870, the island was sold to Farquhar Campbell, from Aros, a man keen on Rùm's potential for shooting. In 1888, he decided to sell it; the sale prospectus described Rùm as "the most picturesque of the islands which lie off the west coast of Scotland" and "as a sporting estate it has at present few equals". According to the sale documents, the population was between 60 and 70, all either shepherds or estate workers and their families. There were no crofts on the island.

In 1888 the island was sold to John Bullough, a cotton machinery manufacturer (and self-made millionaire) from Accrington in Lancashire, who continued to use the island for recreational purposes. In the following year, counties were formally created in Scotland, on shrieval boundaries, by a dedicated Local Government Act; Rùm therefore became part of the new county of Argyll. When Bullough died in 1891 he was buried on Rùm, in a rock-cut family mausoleum, under an octagonal stone tower. His heirs, however, felt that this was beneath his dignity, and demolished it, moving his sarcophagus into an elaborate mausoleum modelled as a Greek temple, built in 1892 and designed by William James Morley. Argyll, similarly, was not thought fitting for Rùm, and that same year (Note: 1891) was moved by boundary review to the county of Inverness, where Eigg already sat.

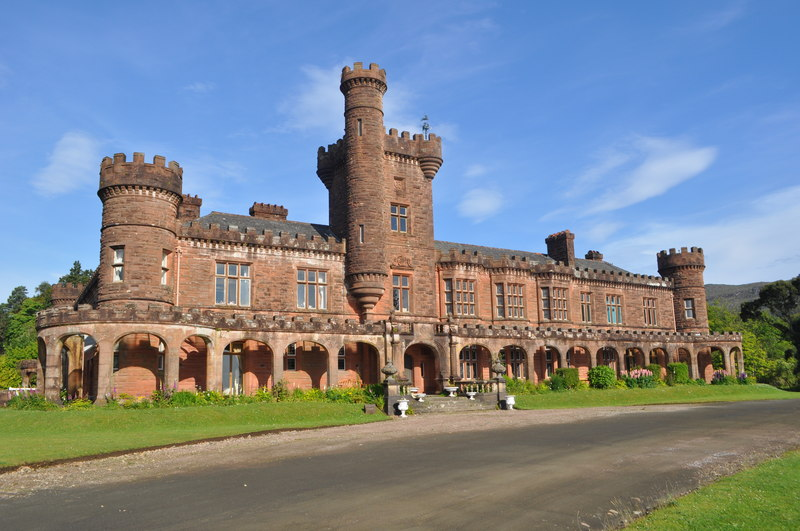
Kinloch Castle

John was succeeded as owner of Rùm by his son, George (later Sir George). George built Kinloch Castle in 1900 using sandstone quarried at Annan (Note: some sources say the stone was from Arran). The interior boasted an orchestrion that could simulate the sounds of brass, drum and woodwind, an air-conditioned billiards room, and a jacuzzi. A dam was built on Coire Dubh burn for hydroelectric purposes; the house was the first private home in Scotland, outside of Glasgow, to have an electricity supply.

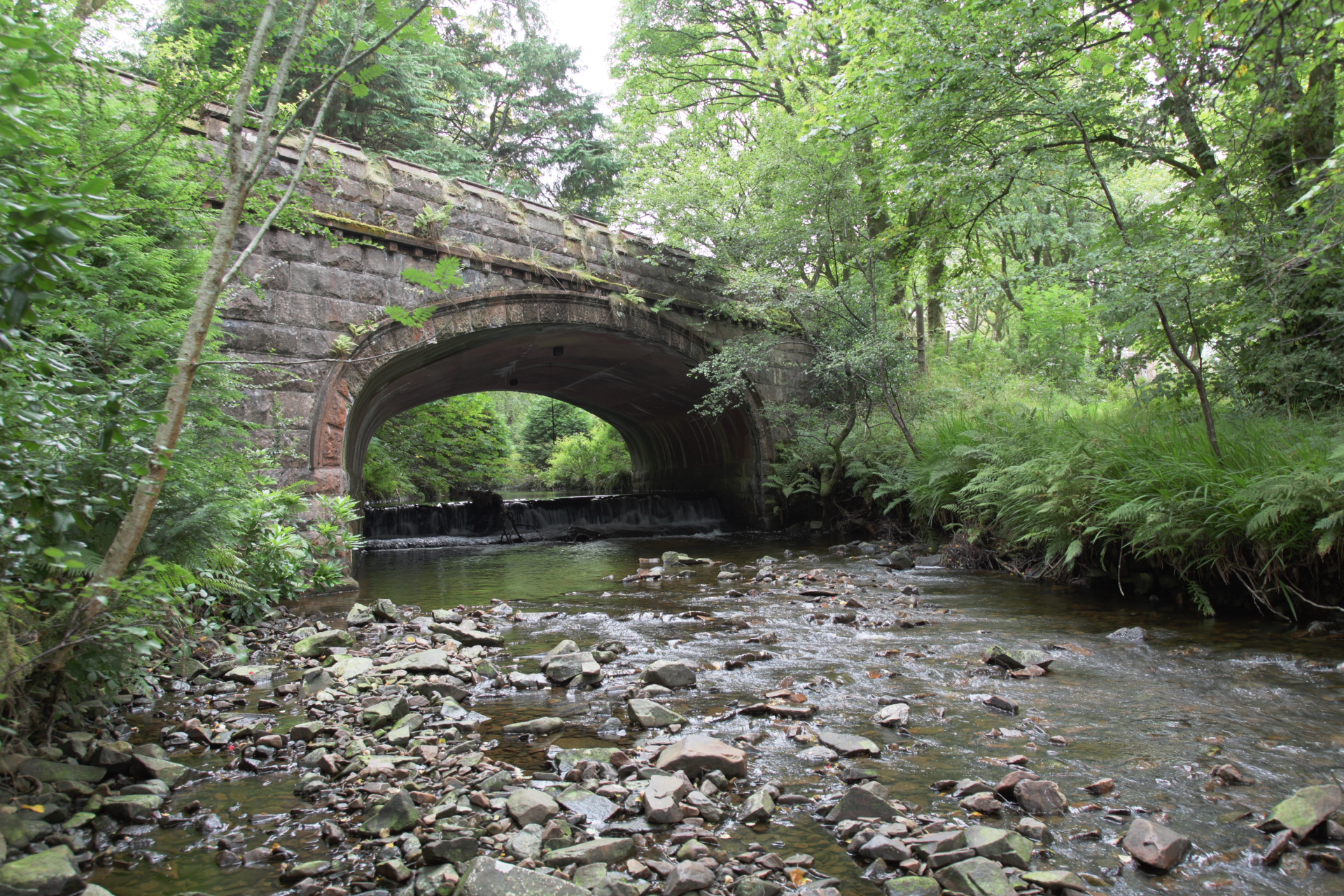
Bridge in the Castle grounds

At this time there were about 100 people employed on the estate. Fourteen under-gardeners, who were paid extra to wear kilts, worked on the extensive grounds that included a nine-hole golf course, tennis and squash courts, heated turtle and alligator ponds and an aviary including birds of paradise and humming birds. Soil for the grounds was imported from Ayrshire and figs, peaches, grapes and nectarines were grown in greenhouses.

This opulence could not be sustained indefinitely, and the Wall Street crash badly damaged the family finances, decreasing their interest in, and visits to, Rùm. Sir George died in France, in July 1939, shortly before the outbreak of World War II, and was interred in the family mausoleum on Rùm. His widow continued to visit Rùm as late as 1954. When in 1957 Lady Bullough sold the whole island, including the Castle and its contents, to the Nature Conservancy Council (Note: for the "knock-down price of £23,000"), on the understanding that it would be used as a national nature reserve, the mausoleum was the only part of Rùm not included in the sale. Lady Bullough died in London, in 1967, at the age of 98; she was buried next to her husband in the Rùm mausoleum.

== Ecology ==
Rùm is an important study site for research in ecology and numerous academic papers have been produced based on work undertaken on the island. In addition to its status as a National Nature Reserve, Rùm was designated a Biosphere Reserve from 1976 to 2002, a Site of Special Scientific Interest in 1987, and has seventeen sites scheduled as nationally important ancient monuments.

=== Fauna ===
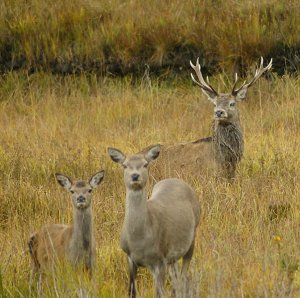
Red deer (Cervus elaphus)

The red deer population has been the subject of research for many years, recently under the leadership of Tim Clutton-Brock of the University of Cambridge. These efforts are based at the remote bay of Kilmory in the north of the island. It has been important in the development of sociobiology and behavioural ecology, particularly in relation to the understanding of aggression through game theory. In November 2019 it was revealed that a 45-year study indicated that climate change had affected the gene pool of the red deer population on Rùm. Warmer temperatures resulted in deer giving birth on average three days earlier for each decade of the study. The gene which selects for earlier birth has increased in the population because hinds with the gene have more calves over their lifetime.

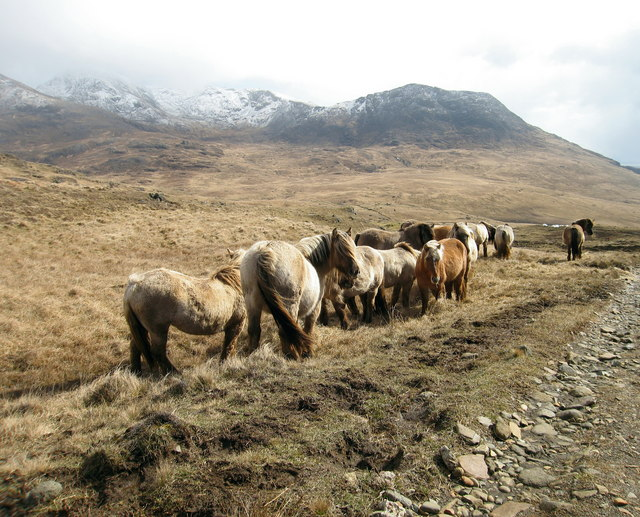
Rùm ponies

The island has small herds of ponies, feral goats (Capra hircus) and Highland cattle. The pony herd, which now numbers about a dozen animals, was first recorded on the island in 1772, and in 1775 they were described as being "very small, but a breed of eminent beauty". They are small in stature, averaging only 13 hands in height and all have a dark stripe down their backs and zebra stripes on their forelegs. These features have led to speculation that they may be related to primitive northern European breeds, although it is more likely that they originate from the western Mediterranean. It is sometimes claimed that they are descended from animals that travelled with the Spanish Armada, although it is probable that they arrived by more conventional means. The goat stocks were improved for stalking in the early 20th century and acquired a reputation for the size of their horns and the thickness of their fleeces. The flock of about 200 spends most of its time on the western sea cliffs. The native cattle were re-introduced in 1970, having been absent since the 19th century clearances. The herd of 30 grazes in the Harris area from September to June, and further north in Glen Shellesder in the summer months.

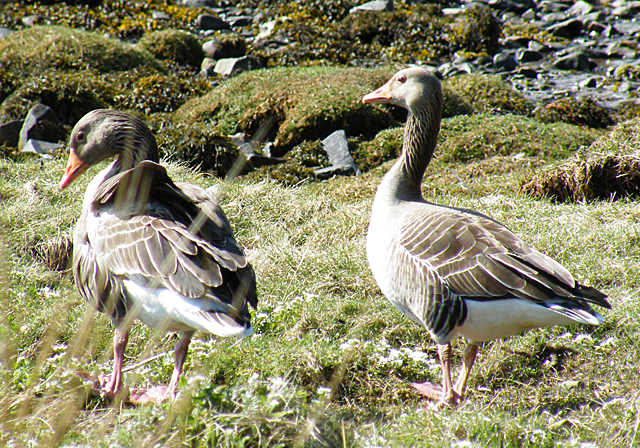
Greylag Geese

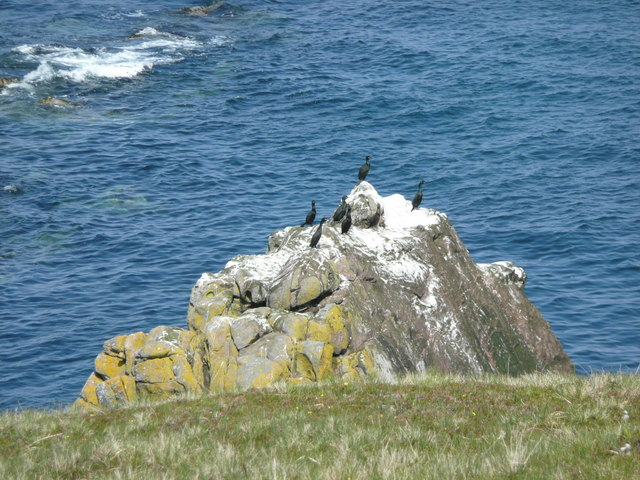
The common cormorant

Rùm is also noted for its bird life. The population of 70,000 Manx shearwater birds is one of the largest breeding colonies in the world. These migrating birds spend their winters in the South Atlantic off Brazil, and return to Rùm every summer to breed in burrows high in the Cuillin Hills. White-tailed sea eagles were exterminated on the island by 1912 and later became extinct in Scotland. A programme of reintroduction began in 1975, and within ten years 82 young sea eagles from Norway had been released. There is now a successful breeding population in the wild.

There are brown trout, European eel and three-spined stickleback in the streams, and salmon occasionally run in the Kinloch River. The only amphibian found on Rùm is the palmate newt and the only reptile native to Rùm is the common lizard. Invertebrates are diverse and have been studied there since 1884, numerous species of damselfly, dragonfly, beetle, butterflies, moths etc. having been recorded. Several rare upland species are found on the ultrabasic slopes of Barkeval, Hallival and Askival including the ground beetles Leistus montanus and Amara quenseli. The midge (Culicoides impunctatus), a biting gnat, occurs in "unbelievable numbers".

In October 2006 the popular Autumnwatch series on BBC television showed coverage of the deer rut at Kilmory Bay.

A 1.5-hectare (3.7-acre) patch of brown earth soil at the abandoned settlement of Papadil is home to a thriving population of earthworms, which are rare in the elsewhere poor soil of the island. Some individuals of Lumbricus terrestris have reached tremendous sizes, with the largest weighing 12.7 grams. This is speculated to be due to the good quality soil, and absence of predators.

=== Flora ===
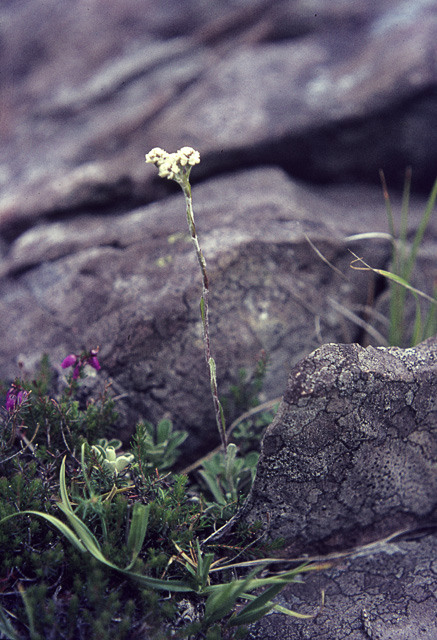
Mountain everlasting (on Rùm)

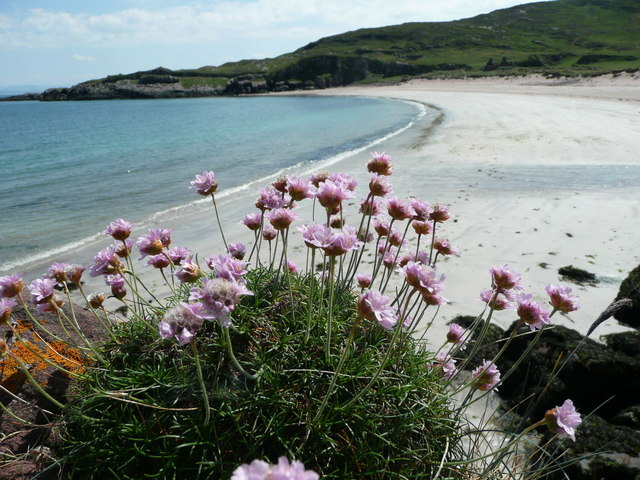
Thrift on a beach (on Rùm)

A tree nursery was established at Kinloch in 1960 in order to support a substantial programme of re-introducing twenty native species including silver birch, hawthorn, rowan and holly. The forested area, which consists of over a million re-introduced native trees and shrubs, is essentially confined to the vicinity of Kinloch and the slopes near this site surrounding Loch Scresort and on nearby Meall á Ghoirtein. The island's flora came to widespread attention with the 1999 publication of the book A Rum Affair by Karl Sabbagh, a British writer and television producer. The book told of a long-running scientific controversy over the alleged discovery of certain plants on Rùm by botanist John William Heslop-Harrison—discoveries that are now considered to be fraudulent. Heslop Harrison is widely believed to have placed many of these plants on the island himself to provide evidence for his theory about the geological development of the Hebridean islands. Nonetheless, the native flora offers much of interest. There are rare arctic sandwort and alpine pennycress, endemic varieties of the heath spotted-orchid and eyebright, as well as more common species such as sundew, butterwort, blue heath milkwort and roseroot. A total of 590 higher plant and fern taxa have been recorded.

=== Protected and specialist areas ===
Rùm National Nature Reserve
- IUCN category II (national park)
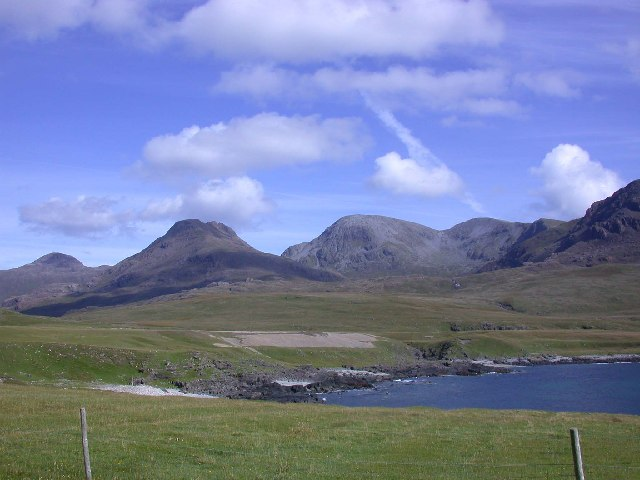
- Harris Bay
- Interactive map of Rùm National Nature Reserve
- Location: Small Isles, Scotland
- Area: 108.4 km^{2} (41.9 sq mi)
- Established: 1957
- Governing body: NatureScot
- Website: Rum National Nature Reserve

Rum has a number of national and international conservation designations for its spectacular natural and built heritage, including:

- Rum National Nature Reserve (NNR)
- Special Area of Conservation (SAC)
- Special Protection Area (SPA)
- Site of Special Scientific Interest (SSSI)
- 7 Geological Conservation Review (GCR) Sites
- Rum is within the Lochaber Geopark
- Falls within the Small Isles National Scenic Area (NSA)
- 19 scheduled monuments (SAMs)
- The national nature reserve is classified as a Category II protected area by the International Union for Conservation of Nature.

== Economy, transport and culture ==
The entire island is owned and managed as a single estate by NatureScot. There are a variety of small businesses on the island including accommodation providers as well as artists and crafters. Most of the residents live in the hamlet of Kinloch, in the east of the island, which has no church, restaurant or pub. It has a village hall, general shop and a post office, which is run as a private business. A small church has been transformed into a school, which counts 5 pupils as of 2022. A cafe opens in summer. Rùm has broadband internet access, installed by a salmon farming company.

In general the island has a transient population comprising employees of NatureScot and their families, researchers, and a teacher. Until recently NatureScot was opposed to the development of the island as a genuine community, but there has been a change in approach since the beginning of 2007. Di Alexander, development manager for the Highlands Small Communities Housing Trust, has said: "It has been clear for many years that the small community on Rùm needs to increase and diversify its housing supply away from exclusively SNH-tied housing. Even a couple of new rented houses could make such a difference to the community's wellbeing."

Surprisingly perhaps, on a 10,500-hectare (26,000-acre) estate with a population less than thirty, an issue has been lack of land for building. However, a spokesman for the agency has stated "Once we are clear what the trust's priorities are, we will release the land".

In December it was announced that £250,000 of land and buildings were likely to be placed into community ownership, subject to a ballot of the electorate in January 2009. The transfer of 65 hectares of mixed land, three crofts, 10 domestic properties and eight non-domestic properties in and around Kinloch village to the Isle of Rum Community Trust took place in two phases in 2009 and 2010.

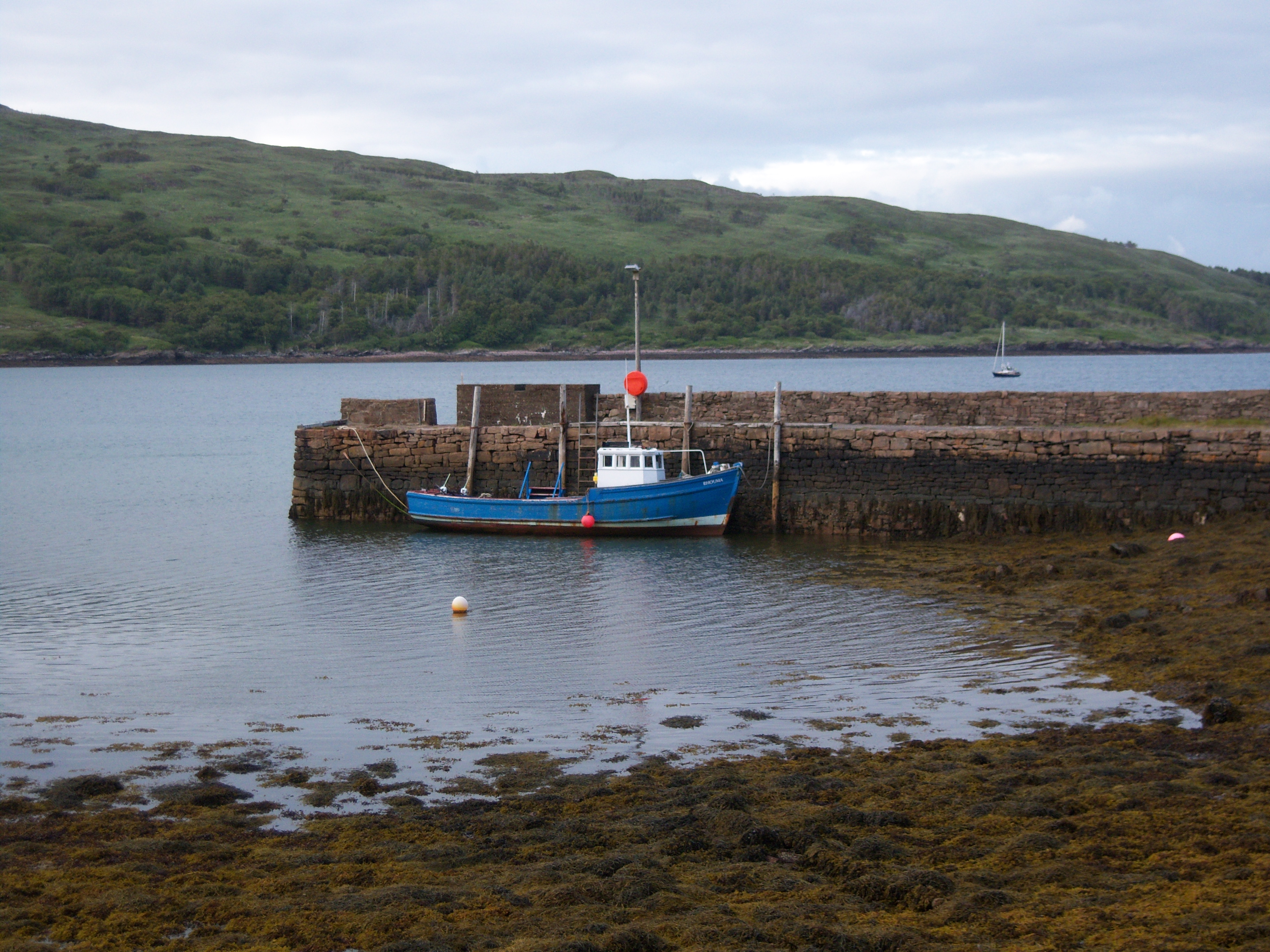
The old ferry pier at Kinloch

A Caledonian MacBrayne ferry, MV Lochnevis, links Rùm and the neighbouring Small Isles of Canna, Eigg and Muck, to the mainland port of Mallaig some 17 miles (27 kilometres) and 1 1/2 hours sailing time away. The Lochnevis has a landing craft-style stern ramp allowing vehicles to be driven onto and off the vessel at a new slipway constructed in 2001. However, visitors are not normally permitted to bring vehicles to the Small Isles. During the summer months the islands are also served by Arisaig Marine's ferry MV Sheerwater from Arisaig, 10 mi (16 km) south of Mallaig.

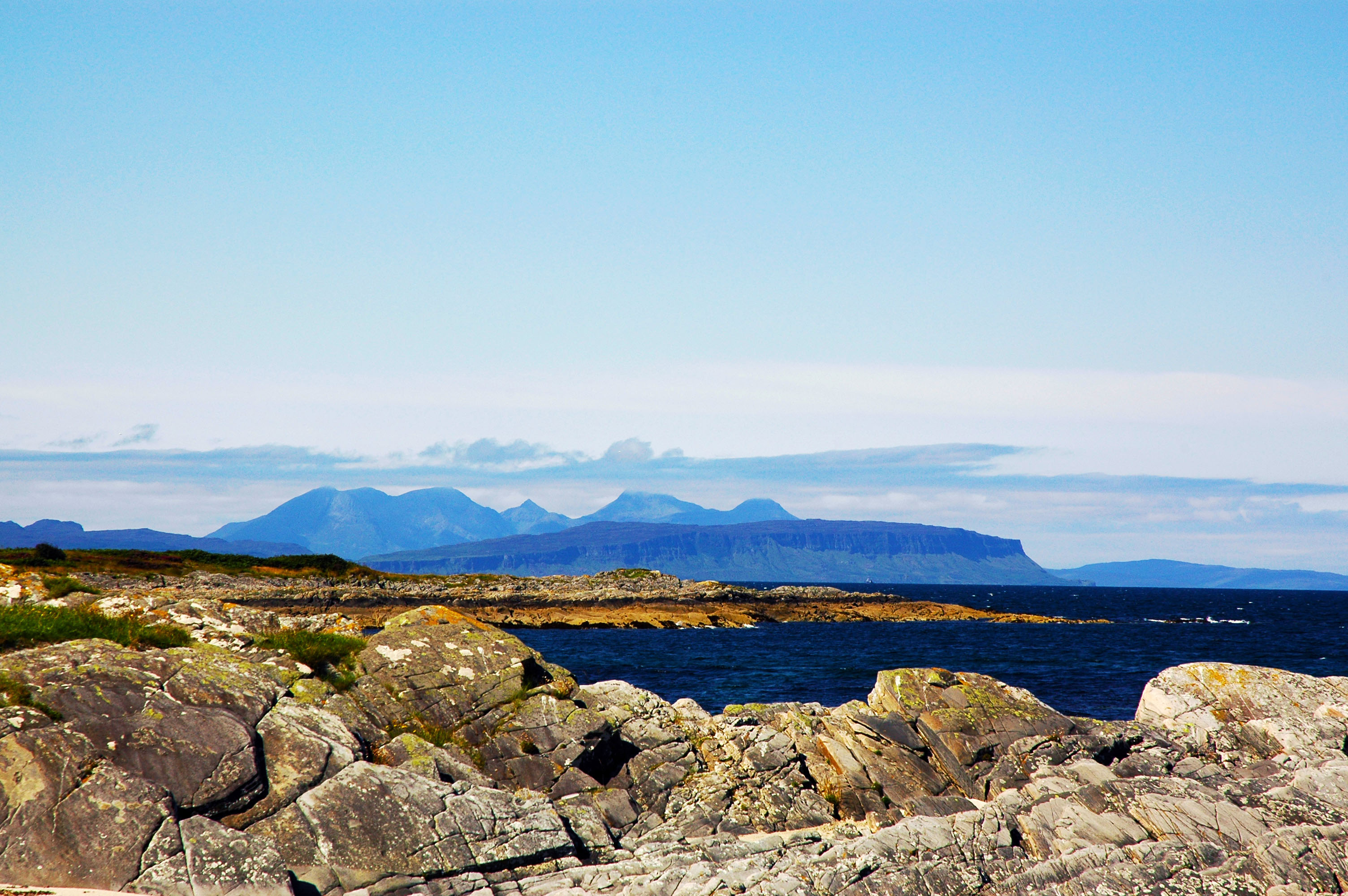
The Rùm Cuillin from Moidart, with Eigg in the middle distance

The best anchorage is Loch Scresort, with other bays offering only temporary respites from poor weather. Robert Buchanan writing in the 19th century described it as:

As sweet a little nook as ever Ulysses mooned away a day in, during his memorable voyage homeward. Though merely a small bay, about a mile in breadth, and curving inland for a mile and a half, it is quite sheltered from all winds save the east, being flanked to the south and west by Haskeval and Hondeval, and guarded on the northern side by a low range of heathery slopes. In this sunny time, the sheep are bleating from the shores, the yacht lies double, yacht and shadow, and the bay is painted richly with the clear reflection of the mountains.

In the summer of 2002 a reality TV programme titled Escape from Experiment Island was filmed on the island. This short-lived show (six episodes) was produced by the BBC in conjunction with the Discovery Channel. The show was to piggyback on the success of Junkyard Wars by having the teams build vehicles to escape from the island.

In August 2020 it was announced that four new homes would be built in the village of Kinloch in an effort to attract more people to live on the island.

In 2024, the island was designated a Dark Sky Sanctuary, only the second such place in Europe to be a sanctuary, and the 23rd such place named in the world. The local effort, "a long meticulous bid", by the Isle of Rùm Community Trust was led by one of the newer residents of the island, Alex Mumford, with Lesley Watt, Rùm's reserve officer, and the support of Steven Gray and James Green, two astronomers who started Cosmos Planetarium, a mobile theater on Rùm. This status may attract visitors wanting to enjoy the night sky, and the best season for viewing is October to March. The people living on Rùm have "dark-sky awareness", which entails changes from typical daily life in the well-lit 21st century, specifically "no streetlights, light-flooded sports fields, neon signs, industrial sites or anything else casting a glow against the night sky."

The natural darkness is important also for the breeding colony of Manx shearwater birds on Rùm. The view of the night sky on clear nights is impressive, showing the stars, the Milky Way, meteors, and the Aurora Borealis or its sheen. View with a telescope to see more. An observatory is planned for the near future.

== Demographics ==
Year	1595	1625	1728	1755	1764	1768	1772	1786	1794	1807	1821	1831	1841	1891	1991	2001	2011	2022
Population	30–5	17+	c.179	206	304	302	325	300	443	443	394	134	124	53	26	22	22	31

Rùm is one of the most sparsely populated of all Scottish islands. There is no indigenous population; the residents are a mixture of employees of NatureScot and their families, together with a number of researchers and a school teacher.

In the 21st century, Rùm's inhabitants have been seeking to attract more people to the island in order to boost their population. Several hundred applications were in response to the campaign and the population increased to about 40. At the time of the 2022 census the number of inhabitants was recorded as 31.

== Climate ==
Like the rest of the British Isles, Rùm features a strongly maritime climate with cool summers and mild winters.

There is a MetOffice weather station at Kinloch providing long term climate observations.

Climate data for Rùm (Kinloch): 5 m (16 ft) 1991–2020 normals, extremes 1960–2009
Month	Jan	Feb	Mar	Apr	May	Jun	Jul	Aug	Sep	Oct	Nov	Dec	Year
Record high °C (°F)	16.7 (62.1)	13.9 (57.0)	17.2 (63.0)	23.0 (73.4)	25.6 (78.1)	27.9 (82.2)	28.5 (83.3)	27.5 (81.5)	23.0 (73.4)	20.1 (68.2)	16.2 (61.2)	14.2 (57.6)	28.5 (83.3)
Mean daily maximum °C (°F)	7.8 (46.0)	7.8 (46.0)	9.2 (48.6)	11.1 (52.0)	14.8 (58.6)	15.8 (60.4)	17.6 (63.7)	17.7 (63.9)	15.8 (60.4)	12.6 (54.7)	10.0 (50.0)	7.9 (46.2)	12.3 (54.2)
Daily mean °C (°F)	5.2 (41.4)	5.1 (41.2)	6.3 (43.3)	7.6 (45.7)	10.3 (50.5)	12.1 (53.8)	13.9 (57.0)	14.0 (57.2)	12.1 (53.8)	9.7 (49.5)	7.3 (45.1)	5.1 (41.2)	9.1 (48.3)
Mean daily minimum °C (°F)	2.4 (36.3)	2.3 (36.1)	3.4 (38.1)	4.2 (39.6)	5.9 (42.6)	8.3 (46.9)	10.4 (50.7)	10.4 (50.7)	8.4 (47.1)	6.7 (44.1)	4.6 (40.3)	2.2 (36.0)	5.8 (42.4)
Record low °C (°F)	−9.5 (14.9)	−8.9 (16.0)	−6.5 (20.3)	−4.0 (24.8)	−2.8 (27.0)	−1.8 (28.8)	1.5 (34.7)	1.8 (35.2)	0.1 (32.2)	−2.4 (27.7)	−5.4 (22.3)	−9.4 (15.1)	−9.5 (14.9)
Average precipitation mm (inches)	318.4 (12.54)	275.1 (10.83)	242.0 (9.53)	178.7 (7.04)	102.5 (4.04)	135.4 (5.33)	174.3 (6.86)	171.4 (6.75)	207.6 (8.17)	261.8 (10.31)	310.6 (12.23)	278.5 (10.96)	2,656.3 (104.59)
Average precipitation days	22.2	21.0	21.2	17.0	13.5	14.5	16.5	15.7	16.1	19.8	22.4	22.0	221.9
Source 1: Météo Climat
Source 2: KNMI (extremes)

Climate data for Isle of Rùm, Kinloch, 5 m (16 ft) asl, 1971–2000, Extremes 1960-
Month	Jan	Feb	Mar	Apr	May	Jun	Jul	Aug	Sep	Oct	Nov	Dec	Year
Record high °C (°F)	16.7 (62.1)	13.5 (56.3)	17.2 (63.0)	23.0 (73.4)	25.6 (78.1)	27.9 (82.2)	27.3 (81.1)	27.5 (81.5)	23.0 (73.4)	20.1 (68.2)	16.2 (61.2)	14.2 (57.6)	27.9 (82.2)
Mean daily maximum °C (°F)	7.3 (45.1)	7.4 (45.3)	8.7 (47.7)	10.9 (51.6)	14.1 (57.4)	15.8 (60.4)	17.3 (63.1)	17.3 (63.1)	15.1 (59.2)	12.4 (54.3)	9.5 (49.1)	8.0 (46.4)	12.0 (53.6)
Mean daily minimum °C (°F)	2.1 (35.8)	2.1 (35.8)	2.8 (37.0)	3.7 (38.7)	5.8 (42.4)	8.2 (46.8)	10.4 (50.7)	10.3 (50.5)	8.7 (47.7)	6.8 (44.2)	4.0 (39.2)	2.8 (37.0)	5.6 (42.2)
Record low °C (°F)	−9.5 (14.9)	−8.9 (16.0)	−6.5 (20.3)	−4 (25)	−2.8 (27.0)	−1.8 (28.8)	1.5 (34.7)	1.8 (35.2)	0.1 (32.2)	−2.0 (28.4)	−5.4 (22.3)	−9.4 (15.1)	−9.5 (14.9)
Average precipitation mm (inches)	303.71 (11.96)	228.83 (9.01)	257.6 (10.14)	146.55 (5.77)	110.76 (4.36)	132.58 (5.22)	164.85 (6.49)	199.31 (7.85)	266.08 (10.48)	282.69 (11.13)	313.18 (12.33)	295.7 (11.64)	2,689.49 (105.89)
Source 1: Royal Dutch Meteorological Institute/KNMI
Source 2: YR.NO

== See also ==
- List of islands of Scotland
- Beccán mac Luigdech
- Religion of the Yellow Stick
- Geology of Scotland
- Timeline of prehistoric Scotland
- Rum layered intrusion

== Bibliography ==
- Clutton-Brock, T. and Ball, M.E. (Eds) (1987) Rhum: The Natural History of an Island. Edinburgh. Edinburgh University Press. ISBN 0-85224-513-0
- Edwards, Kevin J. & Ralston, Ian B.M. (Eds) (2003) Scotland After the Ice Age: Environment, Archaeology and History, 8000 BC—AD 1000. Edinburgh. Edinburgh University Press. ISBN 0-7486-1736-1
- Haswell-Smith, Hamish (2004). The Scottish Islands. Edinburgh: Canongate. ISBN 978-1-84195-454-7.
- Love, John A. (2002) Rum: A Landscape Without Figures. Edinburgh. Birlinn. ISBN 1-84158-224-7
- McKirdy, Alan Gordon, John & Crofts, Roger (2007) Land of Mountain and Flood: The Geology and Landforms of Scotland. Edinburgh. Birlinn. ISBN 1-84158-357-X
- Rixson, Dennis (2001) The Small Isles: Canna, Rum, Eigg and Muck. Edinburgh. Birlinn. ISBN 1-84158-154-2
- Sabbagh, Karl (1999) A Rum Affair. London. Allen Lane. ISBN 0-7139-9277-8
- Scottish Natural Heritage (1999) Kinloch Castle Perth. SNH Publications. ISBN 1-85397-043-3

=== Further reading ===
- Cameron, Archie (1998) Bare Feet and Tackety Boots: A Boyhood on the Island of Rum. Luath Press. ISBN 0-946487-17-0.
- John A. Love (2001) Rum: A Landscape Without Figures. Edinburgh. Birlinn.
- Pearman, D.A.; Preston, C.D.; Rothero, G.P.; and Walker, K. J. (2008) The Flora of Rum. Truro. D.A. Pearman. ISBN 978-0-9538111-3-7
- Scott, Alastair (2018). Eccentric Wealth: The Bulloughs of Rum. Edinburgh: Birlinn. ISBN 978-1-912476-05-3.
