= Rum layered intrusion =

Intrusion in Scotland

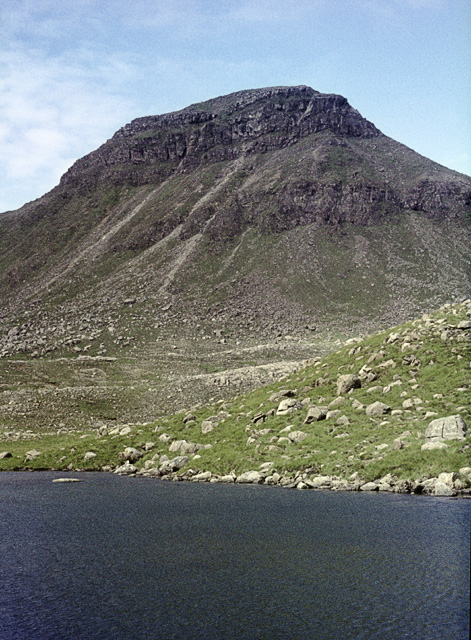
Layers of mafic and ultramafic intrusive rocks forming the mountain of Hallival

The Rum layered intrusion is located in Scotland, on the island of Rùm (Inner Hebrides). It is a mass of intrusive rock, of mafic-ultramafic composition, the remains of the eroded, solidified magma chamber of an extinct volcano that was active during the Palaeogene Period. It is associated with the nearby Skye intrusion and Skye, Mull and Eigg lavas. It was emplaced 60 million years ago above the Iceland hotspot.

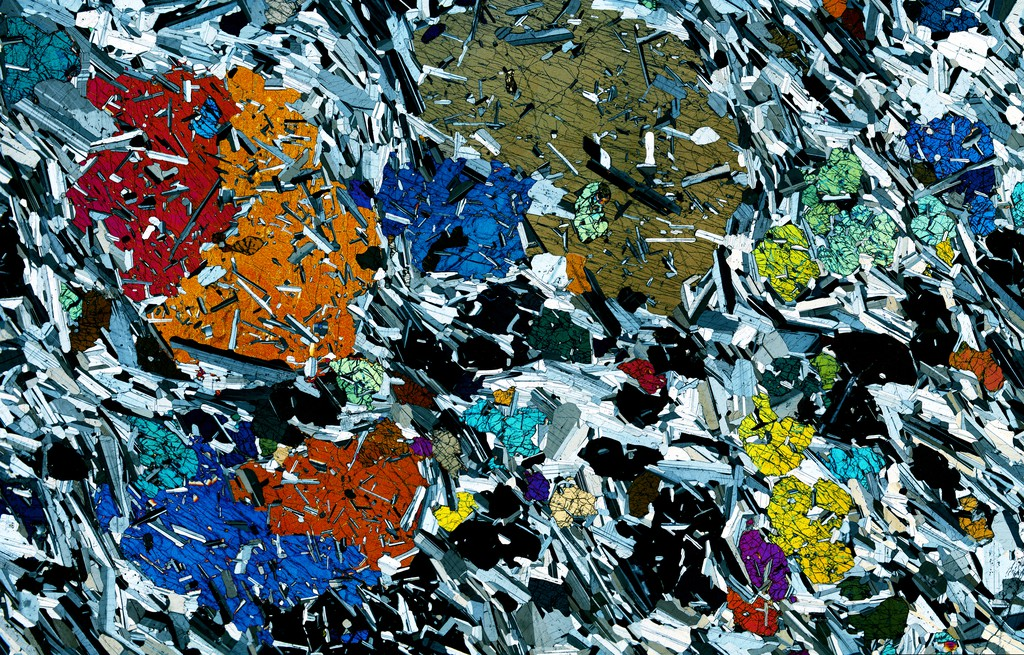
Thin section of gabbro from Rum
