= Askival =

Mountain in Scotland

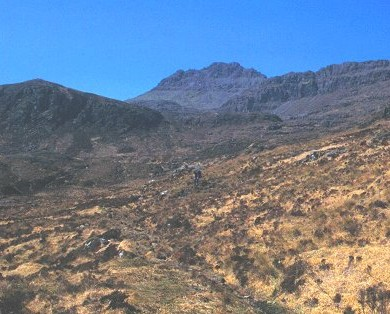
- Askival from the path between Kinloch and Dibidil

Highest point
- Elevation: 812 m (2,664 ft)
- Prominence: 812 m (2,664 ft)Ranked 33rd in British Isles
- Parent peak: none – HP Rùm
- Listing: Marilyn, Corbett
- Coordinates: 56°58′27″N 6°17′30″W

Naming
- English translation: Ash tree mountain
- Language of name: Norse
- Pronunciation: /ˈæskɪvɑːl/

Geography
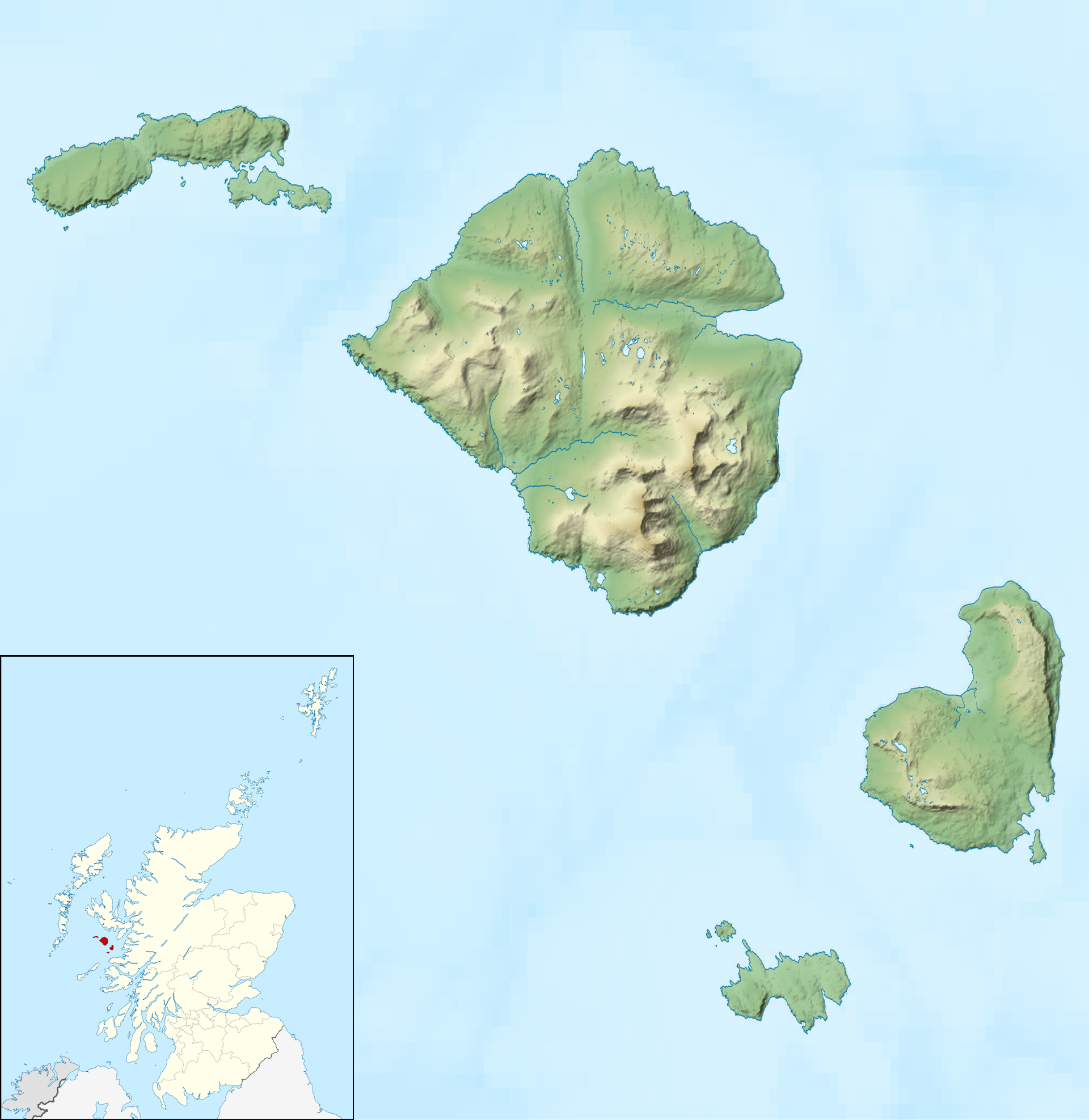
- Location within Small Isles Location within Highland
- Location: Rùm, Scotland
- Parent range: The Cuillin of Rum
- OS grid: NM393952
- Topo map: OS Landranger 39

Askival is the highest mountain on the island of Rùm, in the Inner Hebrides of Scotland. It is located five kilometres (three miles) south of Kinloch, the main village on the island. It is part of the Rùm Cuillin, a rocky range of hills in the southern end of Rùm. It is often climbed as part of a full traverse of the ridge.
