= Kinloch, Rùm =

Coordinates: 57.013°N 6.281°W

Kinloch: Scottish Gaelic: Ceann Locha
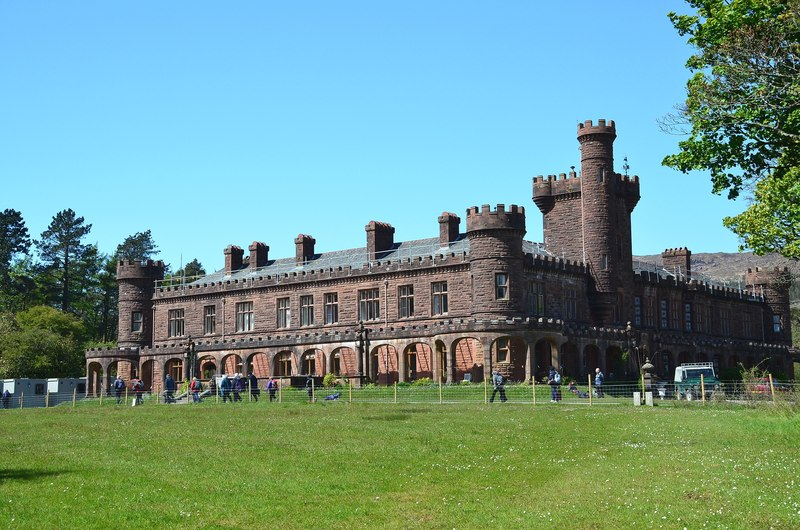
- Kinloch Castle

- Location within the Highland council area
- Civil parish: Small Isles
- Council area: Highland
- Country: Scotland
- Sovereign state: United Kingdom
- Post town: ISLE OF RUM
- Postcode district: PH43
- Police: Scotland
- Fire: Scottish
- Ambulance: Scottish

Kinloch (Scottish Gaelic: Ceann Locha) is a hamlet that is the main (now only) settlement of the island of Rùm, in the Small Isles, in the Highland council area of Scotland. It has a primary school, village hall and shop and is the location of the ferry terminal. It is on Loch Scresort and centred round Kinloch Castle.

== History ==
The name "Kinloch" means "Loch head". Historically Kinloch was not the most prominent settlement on Rùm, but is now the only one still inhabited. In 1850 Port na Caranean was abandoned and people moved to Kinloch which had a population of 40.
