= Sculptured cross =

Scottish celtic cross in Canna

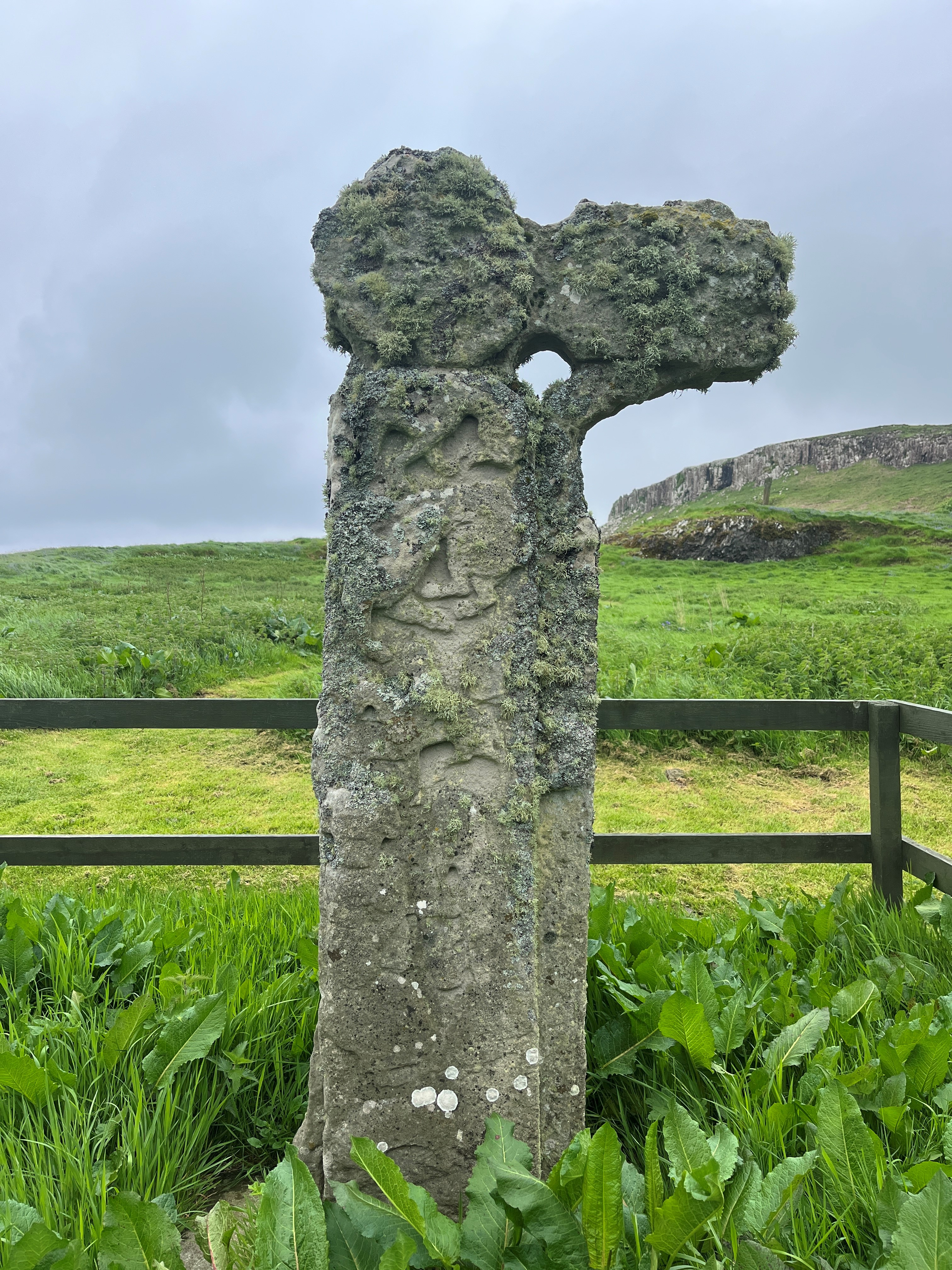
- Interactive map of Sculptured cross
- Location: A' Chill, Canna
- Coordinates: 57.059563°N 6.505122°W
- Type: Celtic Cross
- Material: Yellow Sandstone

The Sculptured Cross at Canna is a medieval, heavily weathered Celtic Christian cross, that was once intricately carved, in a field, located in a small valley, to the west of the graveyard of the St Columba's Church on A' Chill, Canna, Scotland. The cross has been dated to the 8th or 9th century.

== Description ==
The cross is made from yellow sandstone, which is not native to Canna, indicating it was made somewhere else and transported to the island. The cross is approximately 2.11 metres from the base stone and 0.54 metres wide at the base and at its maximum is 26cm thick. Its sits on a central sandstone base. At the top the cross had a circular stone with a stone projection at either side held up by two brackets. The left hand stone projection is missing.

== Decorations ==
Although heavily weathered, the decorations on the cross are still visible. The front side, which faces east consists of animal and figure scenes up to 50mm deep. At the base there is a long necked dog in a sitting position that appears to be biting its own tail. Above it is stag, also sitting. At the left is a tall dressed female figure who appears to be sitting, holding a child, along with a vessel that has a spout, indicating it is the virgin and child. Standing next to the Madonna figure is one of the bearded man with long hair. Above the them is a rider on a horse, trotting to the left. Above that is a four-legged animal that seems to be sitting. Above that at the very top, is a 2 legged animal.

On the north face has a rounded figure that supports the arm at the top. Below that that is two smaller figures. The west face has four panels, the top three each contain animal designs that are connected together. The bottom panel contain dragons facing and guarding a human figure, suggesting the legend of Saint George and the Dragon. The cross in parts is covered with an interlace pattern ornamention. The roundel has four scroll like designs.

Different viewpoints of the cross

Top head piece of the cross showing the missing arm

Front image of the cross

Image showing the remains of the interlace pattern
