= St Columba's Church, Canna =

Church in the Small Isles, Scotland

Church of Scotland Canna
- Canna Rhu Church, Canna Church
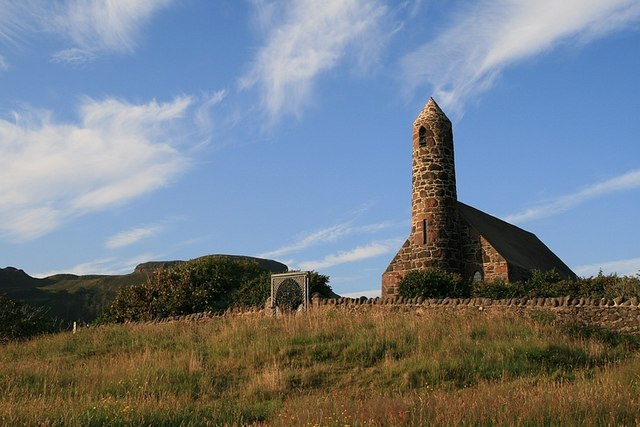
- Church in 2008 with the 1969 gate at left.
- Church of Scotland Canna
- 57.0587°N 6.4935°W
- Denomination: Church of Scotland

History
- Status: Active
- Dedication: St Columba

Architecture
- Heritage designation: Category B
- Designated: 5 October 1971
- Architect: P. M. Chalmers
- Groundbreaking: 1912
- Completed: 1914

Specifications
- Materials: stone

Administration
- Parish: North West Lochaber

St Columba's Church is a Category B listed building on the isle of Canna, in the Small Isles, Highland, Scotland.

== History ==
Prior to the building of the church, the island's Protestant residents were obliged to travel 30 miles to the nearest parish church. The building of the church was instigated by Mary Johanna Cameron. She was the wife of Allan Thom, whose family owned Canna until 1938. The church was built in memory of Allan Thom's father, Robert, who purchased Canna in 1881 and had invested in improvements to the island's infrastructure. Although the church was built to serve the island's Protestant inhabitants, Canna was and is principally Catholic.

The church is orientated East-North-East to West-South-West, rather than the more usual East-West, though why this was done is unclear. The church has a graveyard, though this contains only a single headstone; that of Joanna and Allan Thom.

In 1969, an ornamental wrought-iron gate was added to the churchyard and listed status came in 1971. Owing to the shape of its tower, the church is known informally as 'The Rocket Church'.

To the west of the church sits the sculptured cross, an ancient Celtic Christian cross dated to between the 8th and 9th century.

== Present Day ==
Canna's present-day population rests at around 20. As most islanders are Catholic, St Columba's, whilst still consecrated for worship, is rarely used and is all but defunct. In 2015, it was reported that the National Trust for Scotland were seeking funds to repair the church and use it as an exhibition-space for memorabilia from the 1881-1938 period. Nearby is the island's Catholic chapel, also dedicated to St Columba.

== Gallery ==
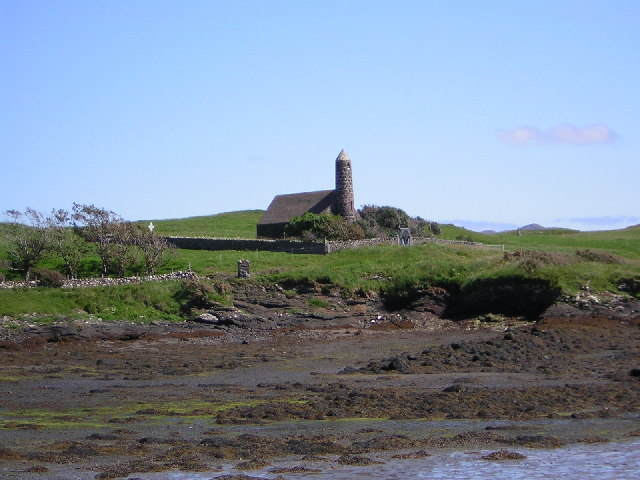
Church from afar

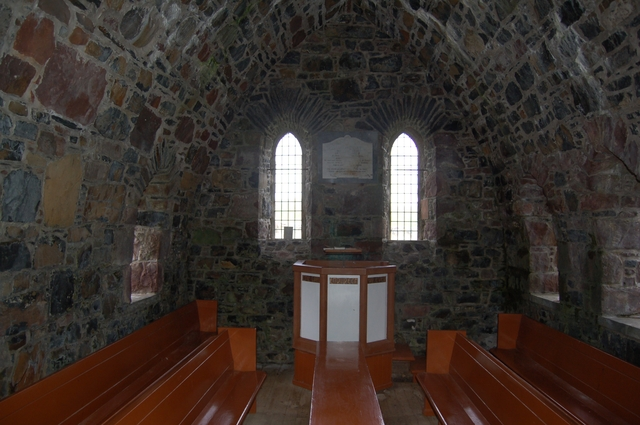
St Columba's interior

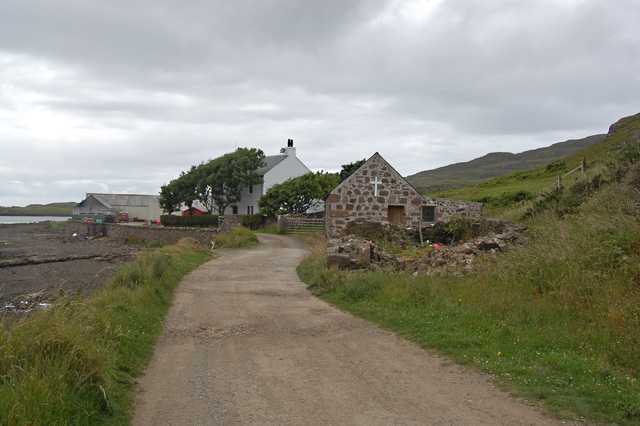
The similarly-named Catholic chapel
