= A' Chill =

Former village in Scotland

Coordinates: 57.056°N 6.510°W

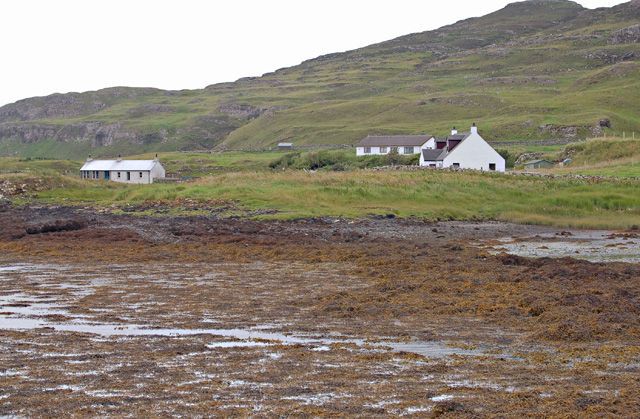
- Houses at A' Chill in 2008

- Location within the Highland council area
- OS grid reference: NG266051
- Council area: Highland
- Country: Scotland
- Sovereign state: United Kingdom
- Post town: ISLE OF CANNA
- Postcode district: PH44
- UK Parliament: Ross, Skye and Lochaber
- Scottish Parliament: Skye, Lochaber and Badenoch

A' Chill was a village on Canna, in the Scottish Small Isles. The name means "the cell", referring to a Culdee church, and is often anglicised as "Kil-" in many other Scottish names. Located in the west of Canna, it was the main settlement until 1851 when the island was cleared. There are now only one or two houses near the original site.
