= Canna, Scotland =

Island in the Inner Hebrides

Canna
Canaigh, Eilean Chanaigh (Gaelic)
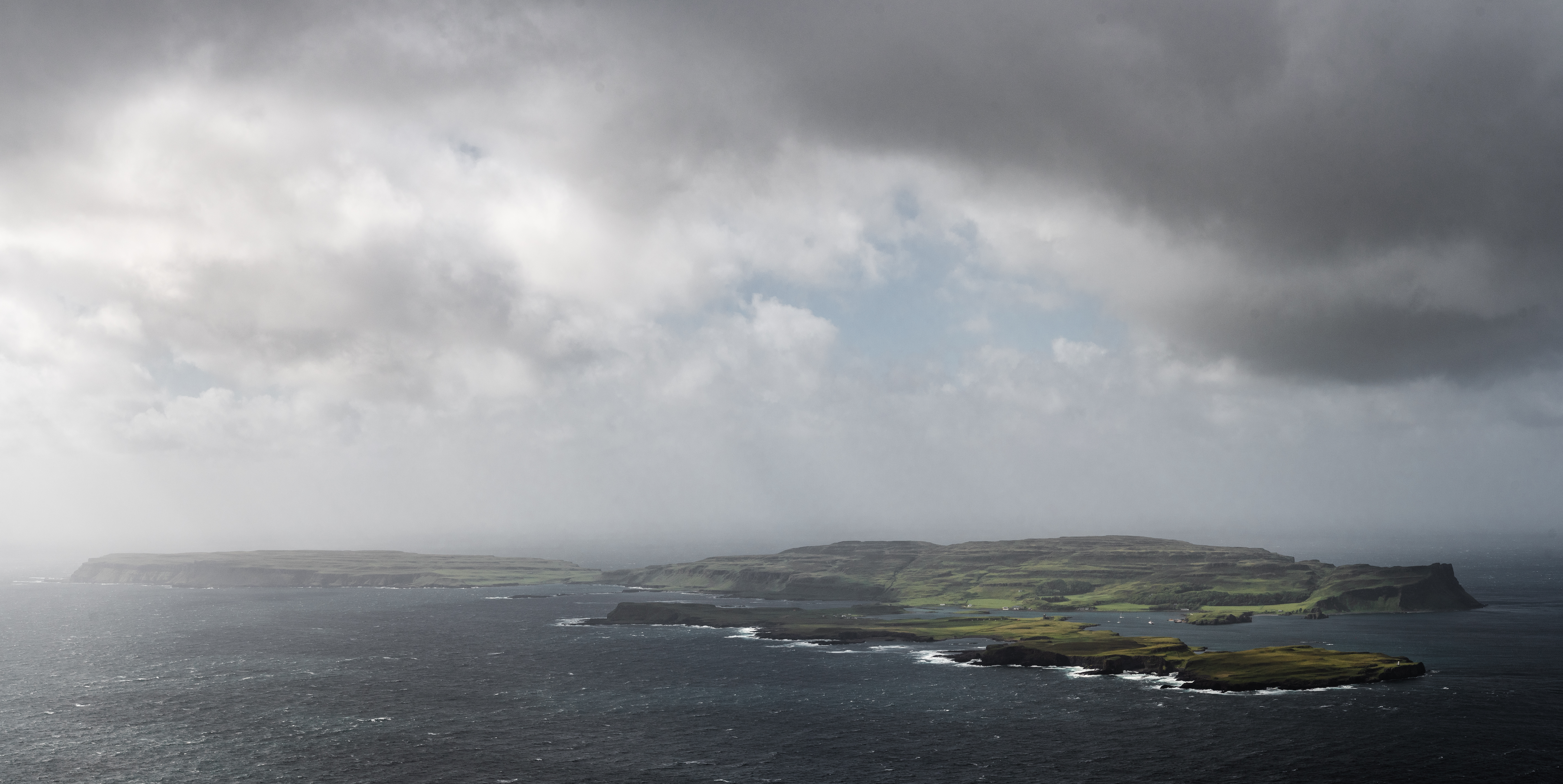
- Isle of Canna, viewed from Rum

Location
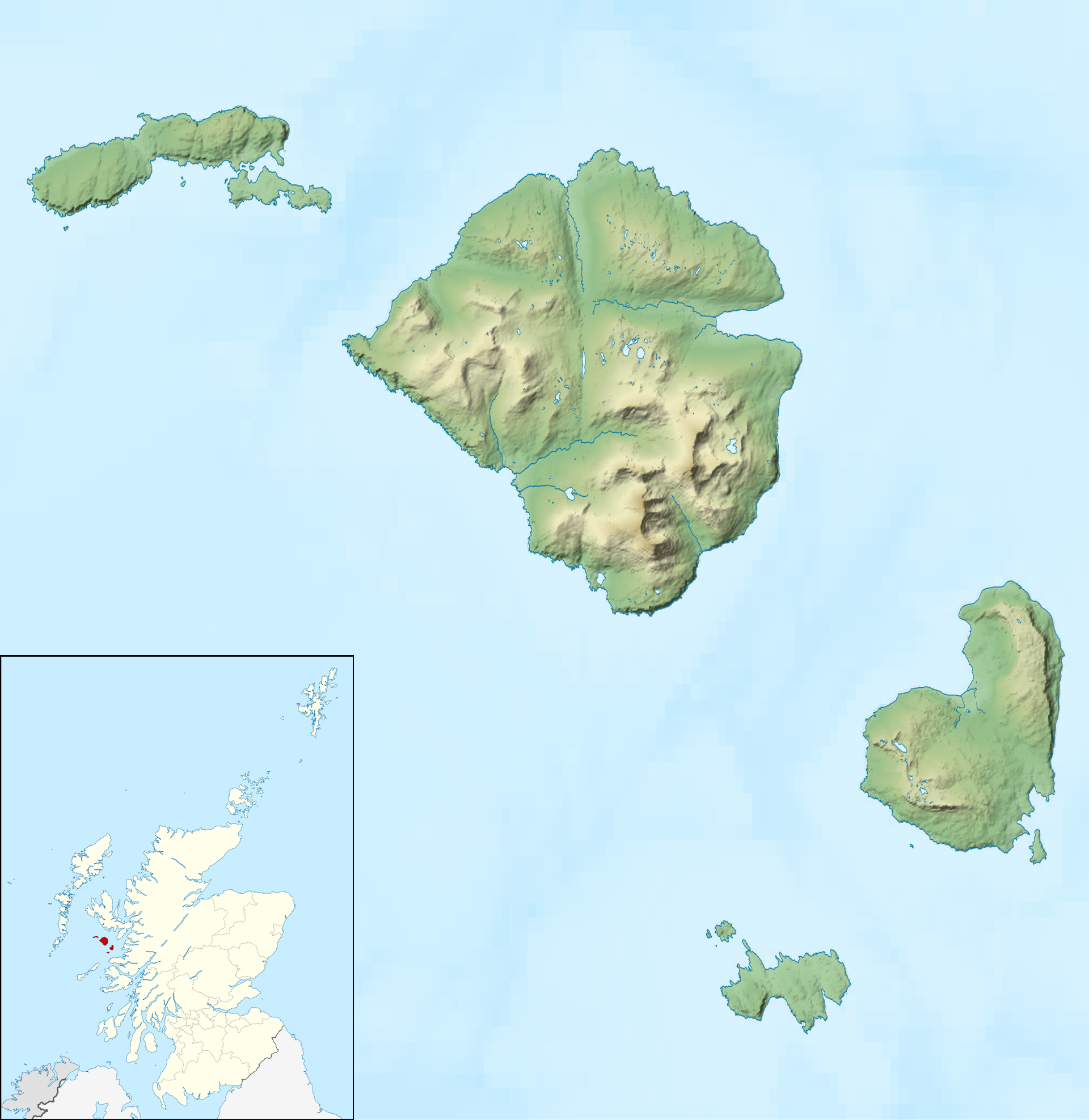
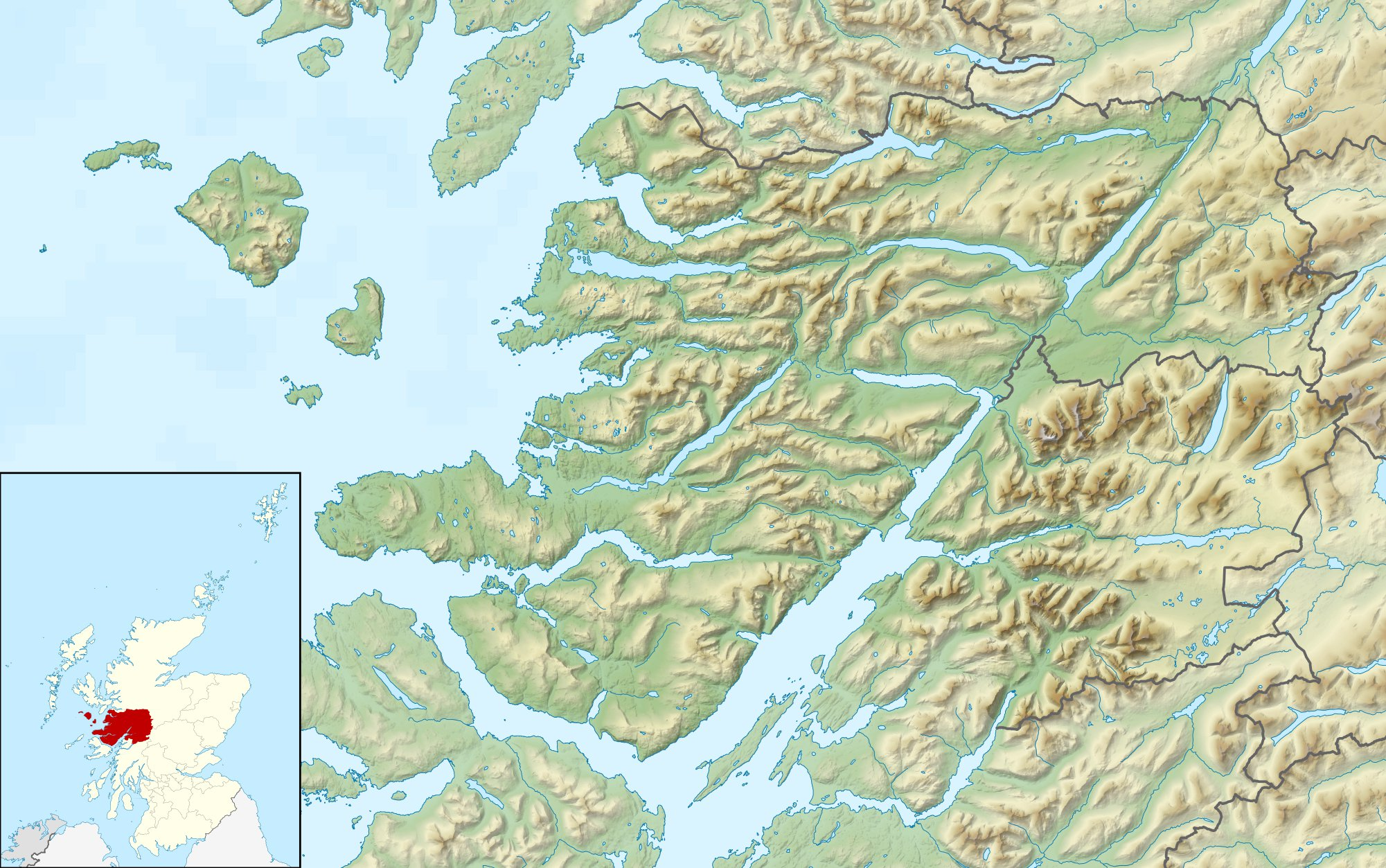
- Canna shown within the Small Isles Canna shown within Lochaber
- OS grid reference: NG244058
- Coordinates: 57.06°N 6.55°W

Name
- Gaelic pronunciation: [ˈkʰanaj], [ˈelan ˈxanaj]

Physical geography
- Island group: Small Isles
- Area: 1,130 hectares (4.4 sq mi)
- Area rank: 46
- Highest elevation: Càrn a' Ghaill 210 metres (689 ft)

Administration
- Council area: Highland
- Country: Scotland
- Sovereign state: United Kingdom

Demographics
- Population: 9
- Population rank: 68=
- Population density: 0.8 person/km^{2}

Canna Lighthouse Sanday
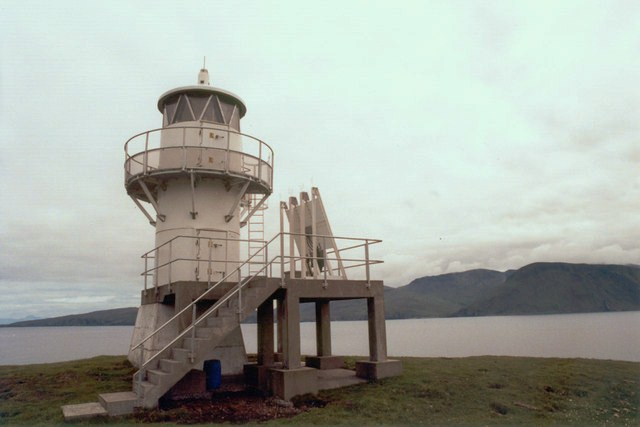
- Isle of Canna Small automatic lighthouse on the eastern tip of Sanday
- Location: Isle of Sanday; Highland; Scotland; United Kingdom
- Coordinates: 57.0471°N 6.4659°W

Tower
- Constructed: 1907
- Construction: metal tower
- Height: 9 metres (30 ft)
- Shape: cylindrical tower with balcony and lantern
- Markings: white tower and lantern
- Power source: solar power
- Operator: Northern Lighthouse Board

Light
- Focal height: 32 metres (105 ft)
- Range: 9 nmi (17 km; 10 mi)
- Characteristic: Fl W 6s.

Canna (/ˈkænə/; Scottish Gaelic: Canaigh, Eilean Chanaigh) is the westernmost of the Small Isles archipelago, in the Scottish Inner Hebrides. It is linked to the neighbouring island of Sanday by a road and sandbanks at low tide. The island is 4.3 miles (6.9 km) long and 1 mile (1.6 km) wide. The isolated skerries of Hyskeir and Humla lie 6.2 miles (10.0 km) south-west of the island.

The islands were left to the National Trust for Scotland by their previous owners, the highly important Celtic studies scholars John Lorne Campbell and Margaret Fay Shaw, in 1981, and are run as a farm and conservation area. Canna House, one of two big houses on the island (the other being Tighard), contains Shaw and Campbell's important archives of Scottish Gaelic literature, folklore, and folk song materials that were donated with the islands to the nation. Since then the National Trust has engaged in new initiatives to attract new residents and visitors to Canna. However, these initiatives have enjoyed only limited success, and in December 2017 it was announced that the trust would be devolving to the island community the responsibility for attracting and retaining new residents.

== Facilities ==
There are some 20 buildings on Canna and Sanday, including three churches, one of which has been deconsecrated (see below). There is also a post office which was converted from a garden shed. The Canna tea room, which closed in 2008, reopened in 2010 as the Gille Brighde Cafe and Restaurant. This restaurant closed in 2013 but has since re-opened again as Cafe Canna. A new resident manager for the island was appointed in 2010. The island is isolated and in the past inhabitants have had to buy all their provisions from the mainland, but it now has a small unstaffed shop operated on an 'honesty' basis. There is a telephone link, a red telephone box and broadband internet access, although there is no mobile phone coverage. Electricity is provided by a diesel generator, at mainland voltage and frequency, and there is a private water supply. In 2010 a proposal to establish a fish farm off Canna was defeated in a residents' ballot, even though it would have created a number of new jobs.

The island has a very low crime rate, but a mainland-based police officer visits the island twice a year, mainly to inspect gun licences. A doctor based on the neighbouring island of Skye is available for house calls once a month. The roads on Canna are not metalled and are privately owned; local vehicles therefore do not require vehicle excise duty (road tax). The previous footbridge to Sanday was destroyed by storms during 2005, and was replaced by a road bridge in 2006. This allowed vehicular access to Sanday at all tide levels for the first time, although the road on Sanday was still covered by high tides until, following a 2017 appeal to raise funds, a new road was completed in 2018.

== Geology ==
In contrast to neighbouring Rùm, the geology of Canna is very much a layered sequence of basalt lava flows of Palaeocene age, all ascribed to the Canna Lava Formation. Many are of hawaiitic composition. Within the lower half of the succession there are also coarse conglomerates deposited by rivers The island is traversed by numerous normal faults most of which run broadly north–south. Basalt dykes ascribed to the North Britain Palaeogene Dyke Suite are seen in the east of the island. Quaternary deposits include glacial till of limited extent around Tarbert and screes which are found beneath various of the small basalt cliffs. Pleistocene and Holocene raised beach deposits are frequent around Canna's coastline, some being late glacial and others post-glacial in age.

== Wildlife ==
Canna is renowned for its wildlife, including sea eagles, golden eagles and puffins. Recently, peregrine falcons and merlins have also been sighted. The island is also inhabited by a number of rare butterfly species. In the nearby waters one can spot dolphins and smaller whales.

Canna is noted for its tiers of basalt pillars that rise over the eastern half of the island and the sea cliffs that dominate its northern shore. The highest point on the island is Càrn a' Ghaill (Scottish Gaelic for "rocky hill of the storm") at 689 feet (210 m). Another point of interest is Compass Hill. Its peak is at 456 feet (139 m) and sits on the eastern edge of the island. It is made of volcanic rock called tuff, and it has such a high iron content that the compass of nearby ships are distorted, pointing to the hill rather than north.

== History ==
=== Prehistory ===
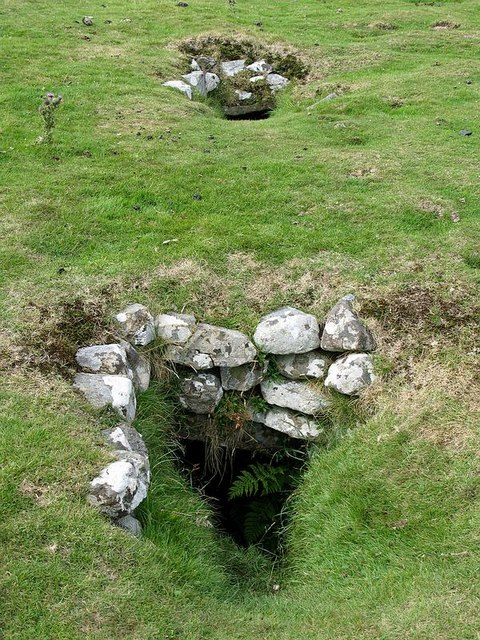
Neolithic cellars on Canna (Note: Their purpose is currently unknown.)

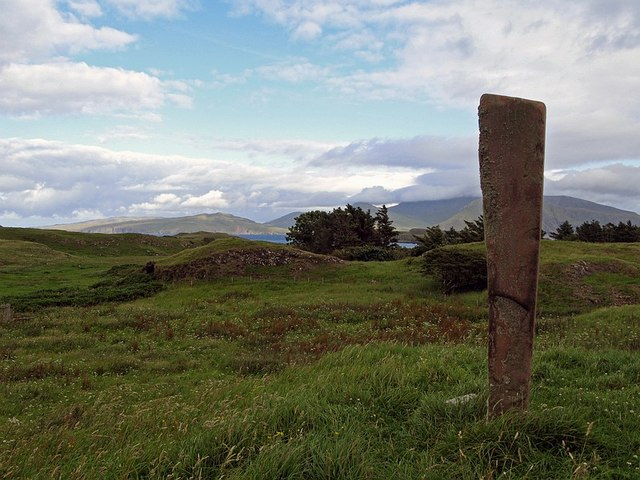
The "punishment stone"

Canna is littered with numerous pottery sherds evidencing the island's occupation in the Neolithic era, along with a small number of mysterious cellars dug into the ground. A distinctively shaped standing stone is found at Keill, around which a local legend has grown: according to the legend, when people on Canna were badly behaved, they would be punished by having their thumb jammed into a particular hole in the stone, at about 6'4" above ground level (hence the stone's name - the "punishment stone").

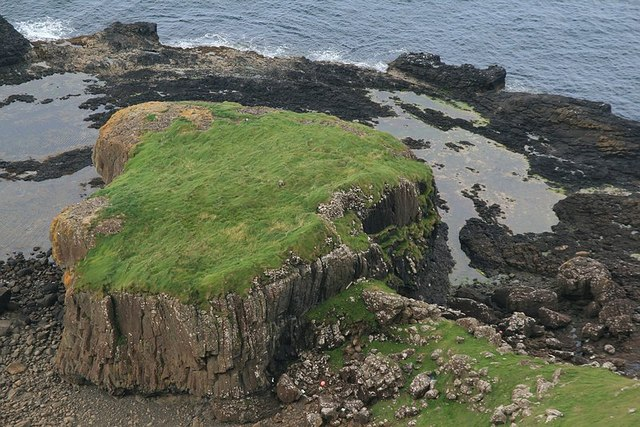
Dun Channa

Bronze Age remains are some of the most extensive in the North-Western Highlands, particularly at the western end of the island; these include fragments of huts arranged in circles, and ancient field walls, as well as pottery artefacts from the Beaker Culture. In the Iron Age a hillfort - Dun Channa - was constructed at the far western edge of Canna; another was probably constructed at the eastern edge, at Coroghon, in the same period (Note: later buildings erected on the site have obliterated much of the evidence).

=== Early Christian period ===
In the 6th century, when the Irish missionary Columba first sailed to Iona, he first arrived at the island of Hinba, which he later treated to as a place of contemplative retreat. The extensive early Christian sculptures and structures on Canna, and its traditional association with Iona, have made many consider it to be the otherwise unidentified Hinba. However, Adomnán (the chronicler of the life of Columba) noted that Brendan the Navigator stopped at Hinba (Note: where he unexpectedly found Columba) while travelling from Ireland to Iona; Canna is a most unlikely landfall on such a journey as it is well beyond the destination (Note: being far to Iona's north).

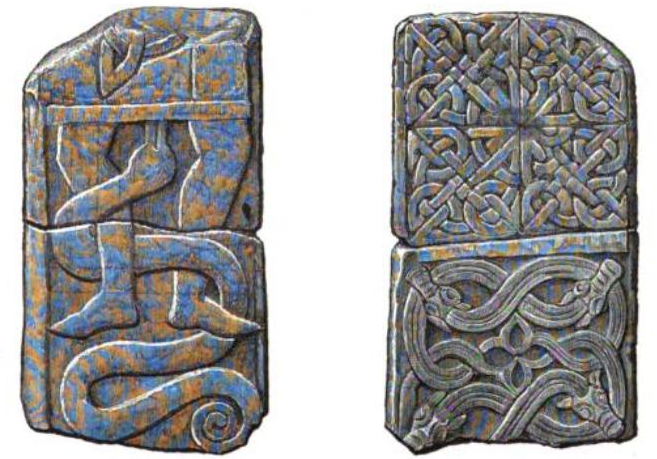
Drawings of the cross-fragments found at Keill

At Keill are two large richly decorated Celtic crosses (Note: In modern times, these crosses have been deemed internationally significant, owing to the quality and condition of their decoration), dating from the 8th to 9th centuries, which are thought to attest to the presence of a monastery. A cursing stone, was located at the site (Note: the Bullaun was long known about, but its curse stone was only re-discovered in 2012); a device normally associated with Ireland, this only the second cursing stone ever to be found in Scotland.

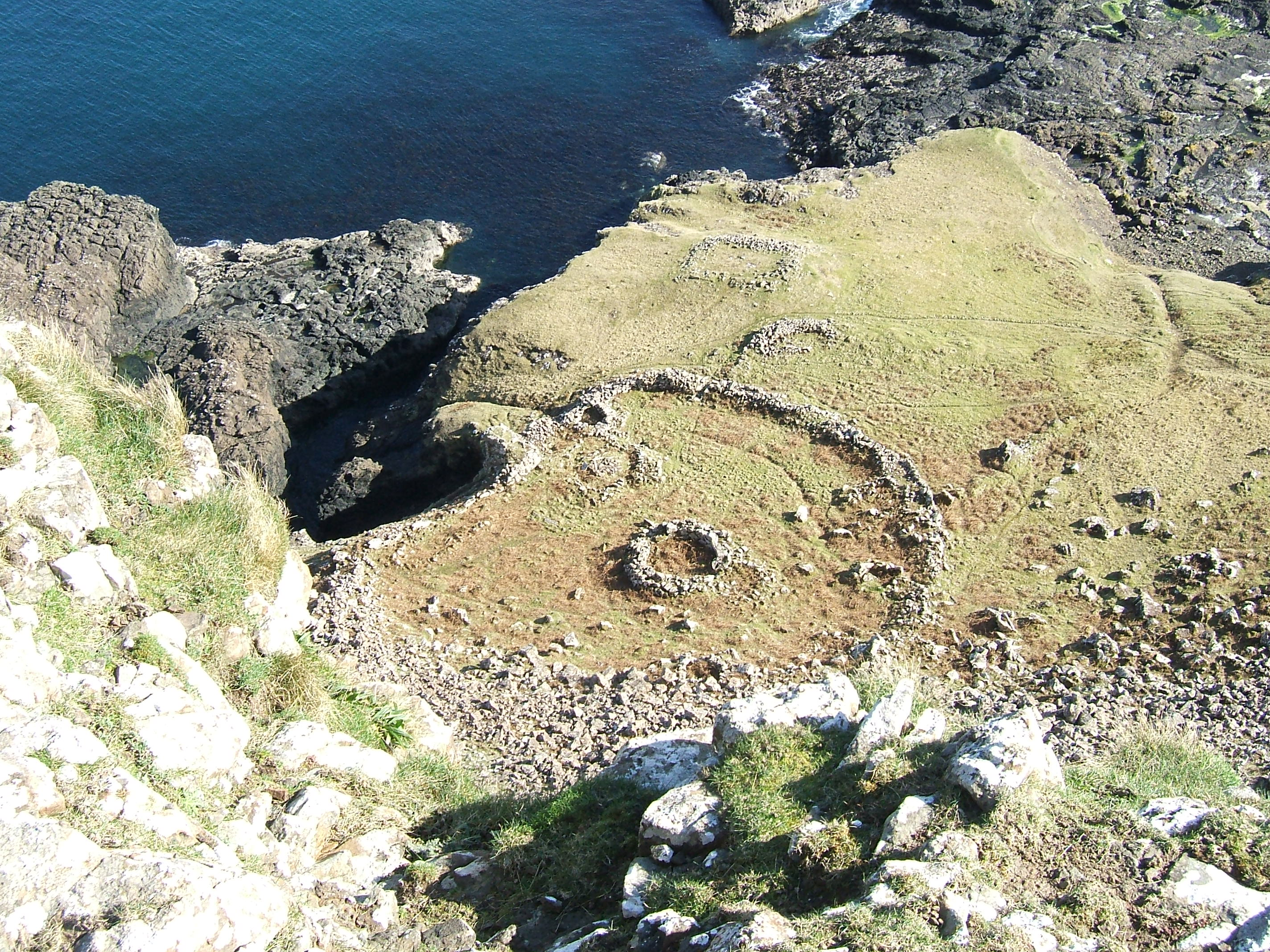
The ruins at Sgorr nam Ban-naomha

On the south coast of the island are the remains of a small, isolated, cashel-like building, which would have been difficult to supply with provisions, except by sea. In Gaelic the site is known as Sgorr nam Ban-naomha, meaning "grassy slope of the holy women"; in the 19th century, local people believed it had once been a nunnery, but it is now thought to have been a hermitage, associated with the monastery at Keill. The enclosure contains three carved stones, bearing crosses (Note: they were discovered in 1994), and was once believed to have had a healing spring.

=== Norse rule ===
Following raids by the Vikings in the 9th century, the Hebrides became part of the Kingdom of the Isles, a Norwegian crown dependency also known as Suðreyjar ("Southern Isles"). Written records are few, but the Viking occupation of Canna is evident from place names such as the element sgor, gearaid (enclosure), tota (homestead) and Sanday ("sand island") (though the name "Canna" itself may pre-date the Norse period).

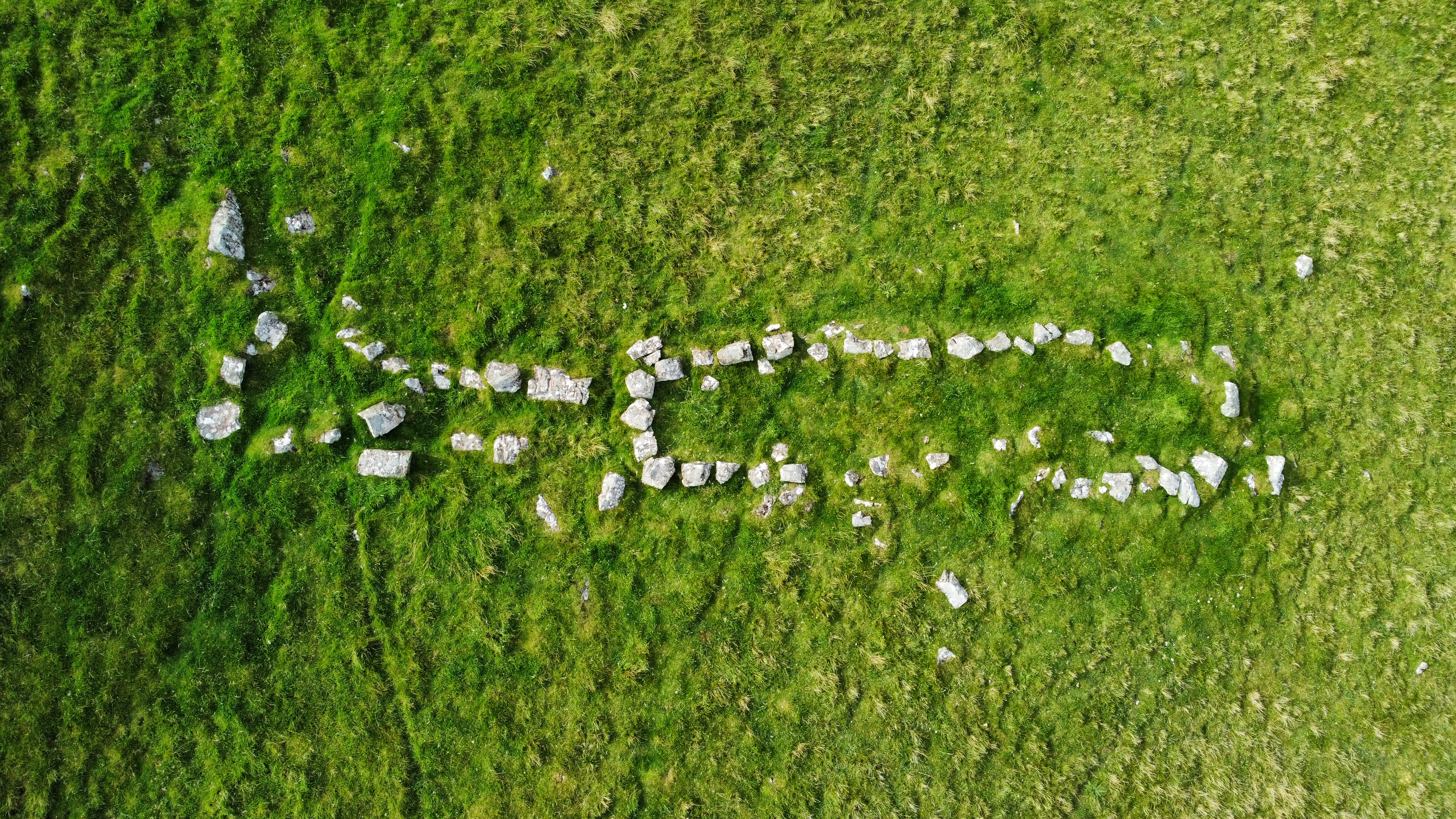
The "King of Norway's Grave"

A number of large oblong arrangements of kerb-stones throughout the island are thought to possibly indicate Viking ship burials, based on the evidence of similar structures on the Isle of Arran (which was also part of Suðreyjar). The largest is located at Rubha Langan-innis on the north coast, and known in Gaelic as Uaigh Righ Lochlainn (meaning "the grave of the King of Norway"); this is a narrow rectangular structure approximately 11 yards (10 m) long by 2.2 yards (2.0 m) wide on a grassy promontory below the cliffs.

Later accounts imply that the monastery at Keill had been a centre of the Culdees while under Norwegian dominion. In the late 12th century, practical authority in Suðreyjar became split between a number of closely related magnates. In 1203, Ranald, the magnate ruling the portion that contained Iona, invited the Benedictines to establish a new Abbey at Iona; that same year, a papal bull was issued, listing the Island of Canna among the new Abbey's possessions. It is likely that the previous Abbey of Iona had had some authority over Canna, perhaps even stretching before the Viking era, but the fact that Norse rulers had not always been Christian may have disrupted Iona's authority, and Iona itself may have been deserted by the time Ranald requested a new Abbey (Note: After 1099, nominal "abbots of Iona" were still appointed, but they were based in Kells).

=== Church rule under the Scottish king ===
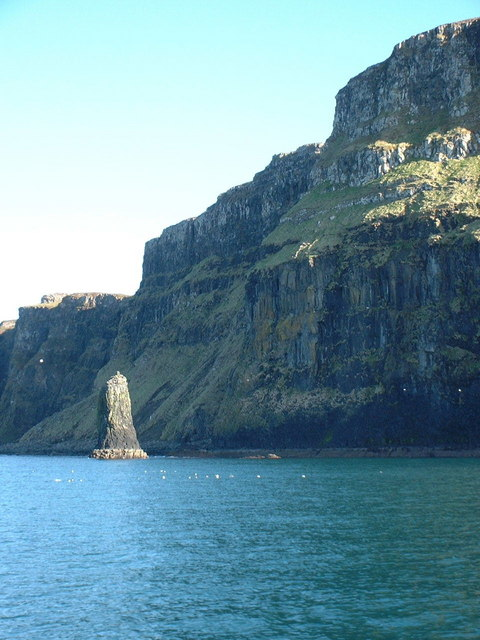
The cliffs at Iorcail

In 1266, the Treaty of Perth transferred Suðreyjar to the Scottish king, as a set of crown dependencies - rather than merging it into Scotland itself. Geographically, Canna lay within the portion of the former Suðreyjar which had become the MacRory realm of Garmoran (stretching from Uist to the Rough Bounds), but documents relating to Garmoran do treat Canna as part of it, suggesting the island was still under the Abbot's control. The Abbot of Iona thus ruled Canna with considerable power. Nevertheless, at the turn of the century, William I had created the position of Sheriff of Inverness, to be responsible for the Scottish highlands, which theoretically now extended to Canna.

During the 1420s, feuding within other fragments of Suðreyjar appears to have spilled onto Canna. The Abbot, Dominicus, obtained papal authority to ban all nobility from setting foot on the island, but this wasn't respected, and Canna had to be temporarily abandoned. In 1428, the Abbot wrote to the Pope requesting that he pronounce a general excommunication against anyone who harmed one of Canna's inhabitants, or damaged their property, claiming:

"by reason of wars and other calamities in the past divers homicides, depredations and other ills were perpetrated, so that some strong men of the familiars of the Abbot and convent were slain by pirates and sea rovers, and divers farmers and inhabitants of the island were afraid to reside there".

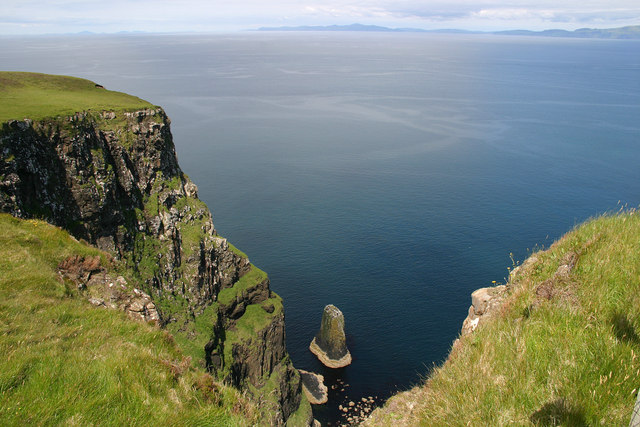
Iorcail from the cliff tops

The Reformation was rapidly encroaching, however, and after 1498 Iona was transferred to Commendators, rather than Abbots. Canna became a possession of the Bishop of the Isles (also known as the "Bishop of Sodor"; "Sodor" is the traditional anglicisation of Suðreyjar). In 1548, the Dean of the Isles, Donald Monro, conducted a survey of the Bishop's lands and churches, reporting that the island was a: "faire maine land, foure myle lange, inhabit and manurit, with paroche kirke in it, guid for corne, fishing and grassing, with a falcon nest in it, pertines to the Abbot of Colmkill (Note: Icolmkill is the old name for Iona)",

In 1561, the Bishop agreed to rent the island to the leader of Clan Ranald, a branch of the MacDonalds. In 1588, some of the remains of the Spanish Armada found refuge with the MacLeans of Duart, who had a longstanding feud with the MacDonalds (concerning the Rhinns of Islay). Lachlan - the MacLean leader - demanded that the Spanish supply him with 100 soldiers, as the price of their refuge, which he used to launch an attack against the Small Isles, in pursuance of the feud; Canna was "burned with fire". Lachlan was imprisoned in Edinburgh by the king for this (Note: the offence was the use of Spaniards, not the violence and arson), but he escaped, and faced no further punishment (Note: due to the king's status as Elizabeth I's heir, and Elizabeth's desire for the MacLeans to assist her against Irish rebels, wider considerations may have been at play here).

=== Argyll ===
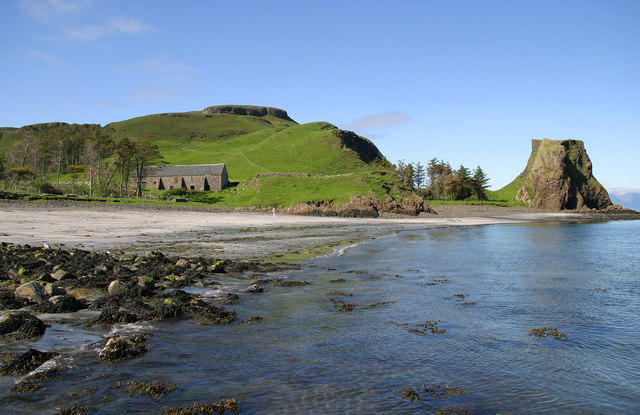
Coroghon, with Compass Hill

By the early 17th century, the Bishopric of the Isles was held by Presbyterians, for whom the office of Bishop had a questionable status. In 1626, Thomas Knox, the Bishop, appears to have replaced Clan Ranald (who relunctantly accepted the reformation (Note: The Clan Ranald leader had agreed to the Statutes of Iona, but made no attempt to convert the population of his lands to protestantism)) as his tenants, with the MacLeods of Raasay (active supporters of the reformation). At the end of his life, in 1627, Thomas Knox sold Canna to the Earl of Argyll, one of the most powerful Covenanters. Under pressure from the Earl, shrieval authority transferred from Inverness to the sheriff of Argyll, which was under the control of the Earl's family.

In 1641, following the outbreak of civil war, king Charles I promised to give Canna to the Baronet of Sleat, since the Earl of Argyll's treason (as one of the king's main opponents) would make Canna forfeit; the king's subsequent defeat made this promise moot. In 1654, the war having ended, the Earl of Argyll leased Canna back to Clan Ranald. In the following year, Donald MacDonald, the son of the Clan Ranald leader, married the Baronet's daughter, Janet, quelling any potential dispute over the island.

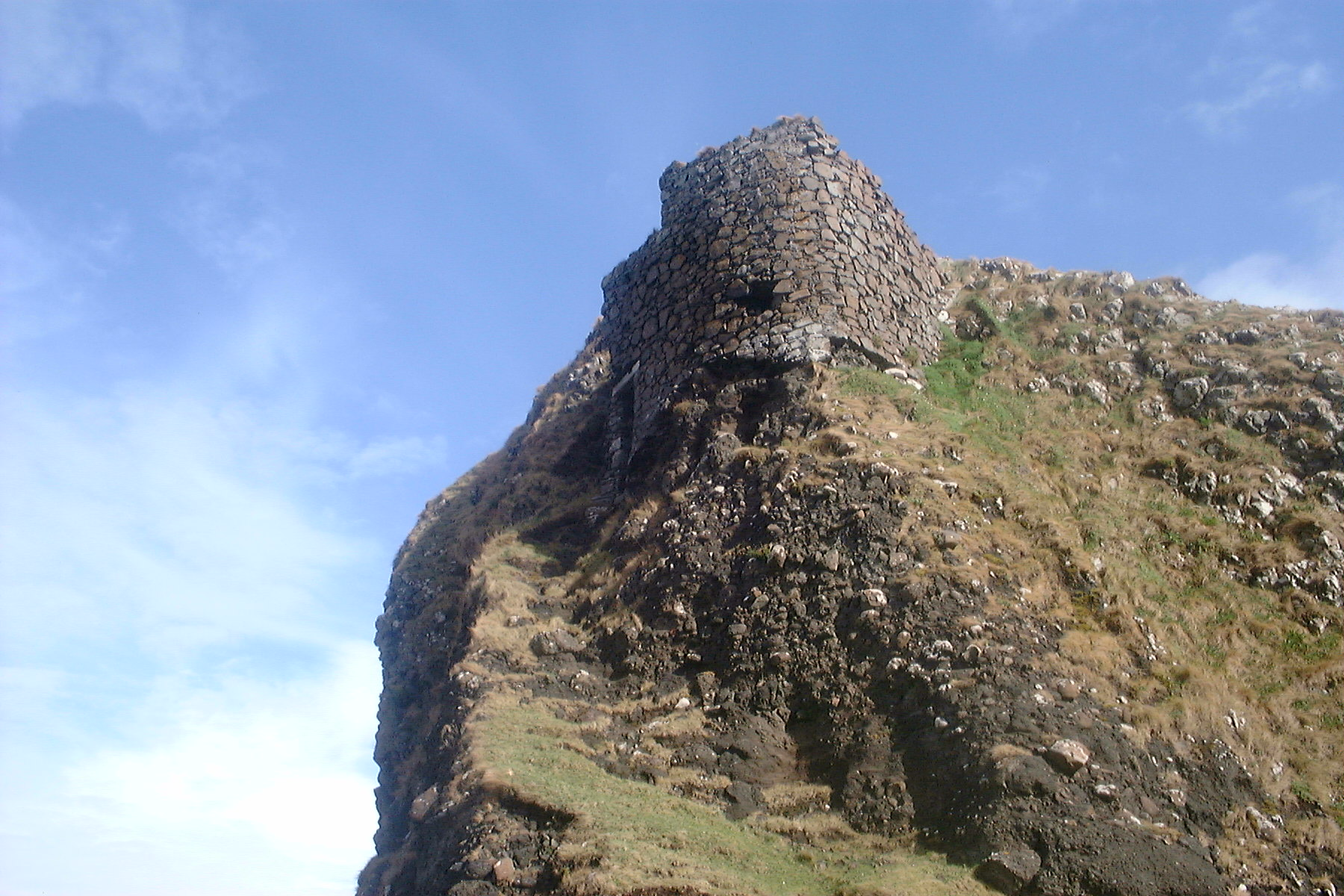
Ruins of Coroghon Castle on top of the stack at Coroghon

In 1666, following Janet's death, Donald married Marion MacLeod of Harris (Note: Marion's father was Donald's uncle), but by 1680 he was seeking a divorce, accusing her of adultery (Note: her supposed lover was the leader of the MacNeils of Barra). At some point in the late 17th century, a small prison (now called "Coroghon Castle") was constructed on the side of an isolated stack at Coroghon; it was described by Thomas Pennant in 1772 as "a lofty slender rock, that juts into the sea: on one side is a little tower, at a vast height above us, accessible by a narrow and horrible path (Note: there are the remains of a lintelled entrance in a mortared wall.): it seems so small as scarce to be able to contain half a dozen people. Tradition says, that it was built by some jealous regulus (Note: Latin for ruler; usually considered to refer to Donald), to confine a handsome wife in (Note: usually considered to refer to Marion)".

Donald had succeeded to the leadership of Clan Ranald in 1670, and in 1672 was give a new charter of Lairdship for Canna by the new Earl of Argyll. A decade later, Argyll's Rising caused the Earl's feudal authority to be forfeit, making Clan Ranald direct vassals of the king. In 1686, Donald died, and was buried on Canna.

=== The Bard ===
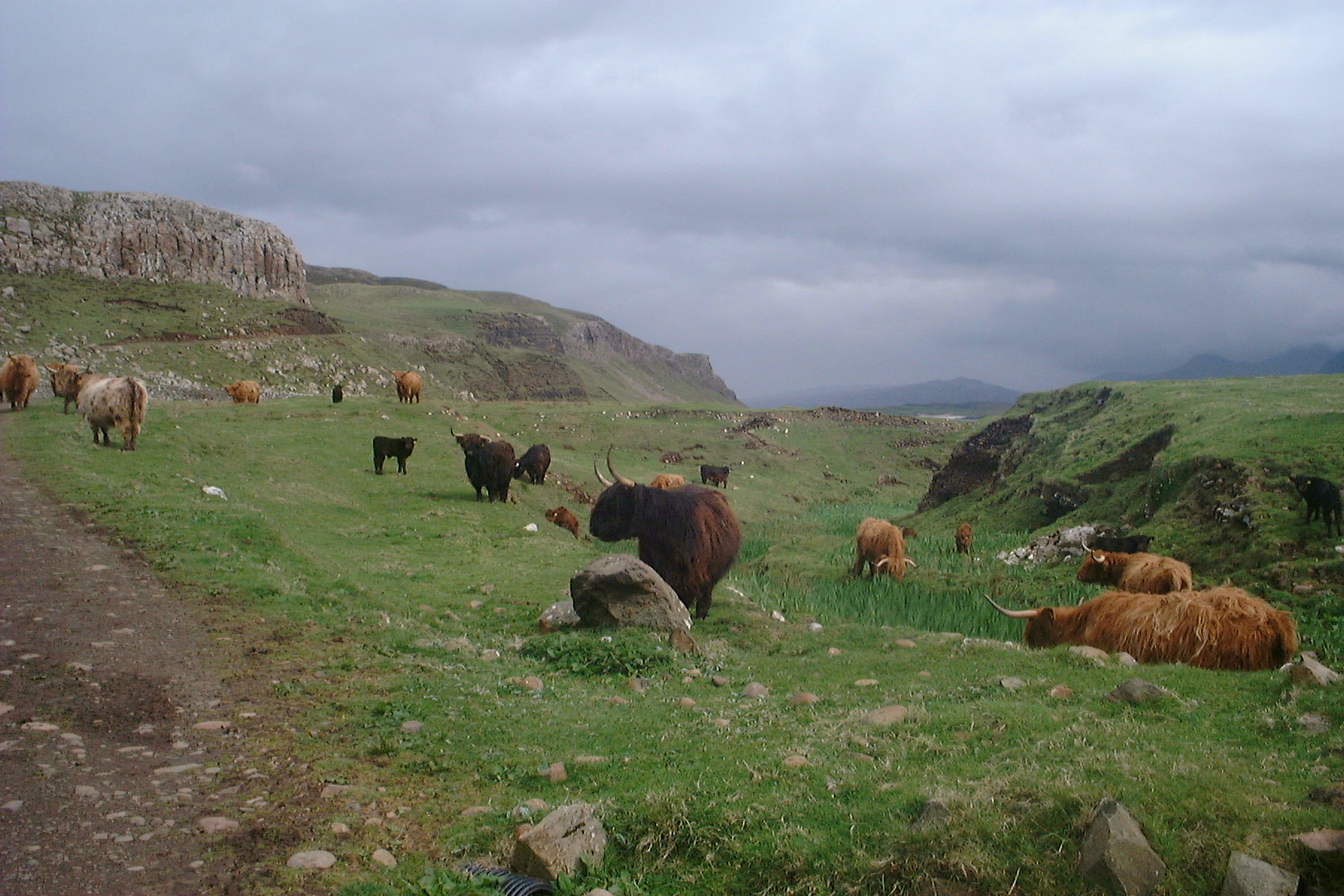
Highland Cattle on Canna

Clan Ranald tenants on Canna joined the Jacobite rebellions of 1715 and of 1745, and as a consequence were not looked upon favourably by the king's forces.

According to the Clan Ranald Bard, on 3 April 1746, the Royal Navy ship Baltimore arrived, and demanded (under threat of force) to be given the meat from the best cattle on the Island; 4 days later, complaining that the meat was rotten, the sailors threw it away, and slaughtered 60 cattle themselves. The Bard goes on to say that 12 days later (Note: 18 April), the Royal Navy ship Commodore arrived, and after receiving warning (from one of the sailors) about the lecherous intentions of the sailors, the women of Canna fled into the countryside and caves, until they were certain that the ship had departed; one pregnant woman miscarried from spending so long in the cold, and died.

The Bard himself served as the laird's representative in Canna (the bailie) between 1749 and 1751, at which point he published the first ever book of Scottish Gaelic poetry. He reports of his predecessor that Major General John Campbell, grandson of the former Earl of Argyll, arrived at Canna after returning from chasing Bonnie Prince Charlie; Campbell seized the Bailie of Canna, and took him prisoner to Kerrera (Note: specifically, Horseshoe Bay), but returned with him to Canna, slaughtered 40 cows, then took him to London. In London, the Bailie was held prisoner, for having taken part in the rebellion, until the Indemnity Act was passed in 1747; for his troubles, Campbell was made a Lieutenant General.

=== Dispersion ===
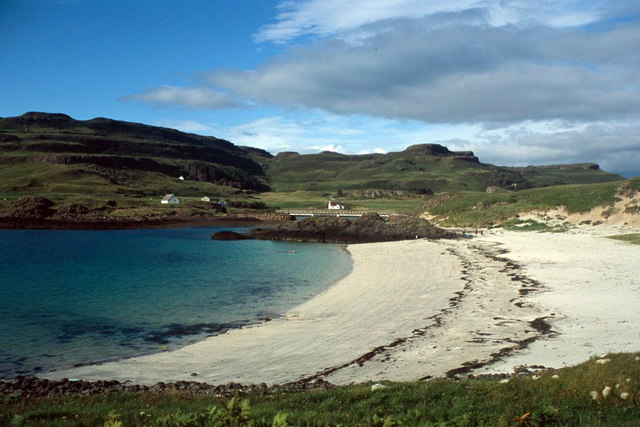
The view from Sanday to mainland Canna

At the end of the 18th century, kelp harvesting became a major industry on Canna, as a result of the Napoleonic Wars limiting foreign supplies of certain minerals. However, when the wars ended, foreign supplies became available again, and the kelp price duly collapsed, causing a recession; in 1821, several of the inhabitants of Canna chose to escape their poverty by emigrating to Canada (Note: on board the "Commerce"). Most of the remaining inhabitants moved to Sanday.

The Clan Ranald leader was not exactly a spendthrift, meaning that the lack of income from his tenants drove him into debt; in 1827, he sold Canna to Donald MacNeil. Donald MacNeil and his son (Note: also called Donald MacNeil) were no better at fixing the economic pressures, and when the crops failed in 1847, the son resorted to evicting the population of Keill (which had been the main settlement), and replacing them with sheep. in 1861, Canna House was built as the MacNeil home.

=== Later years ===
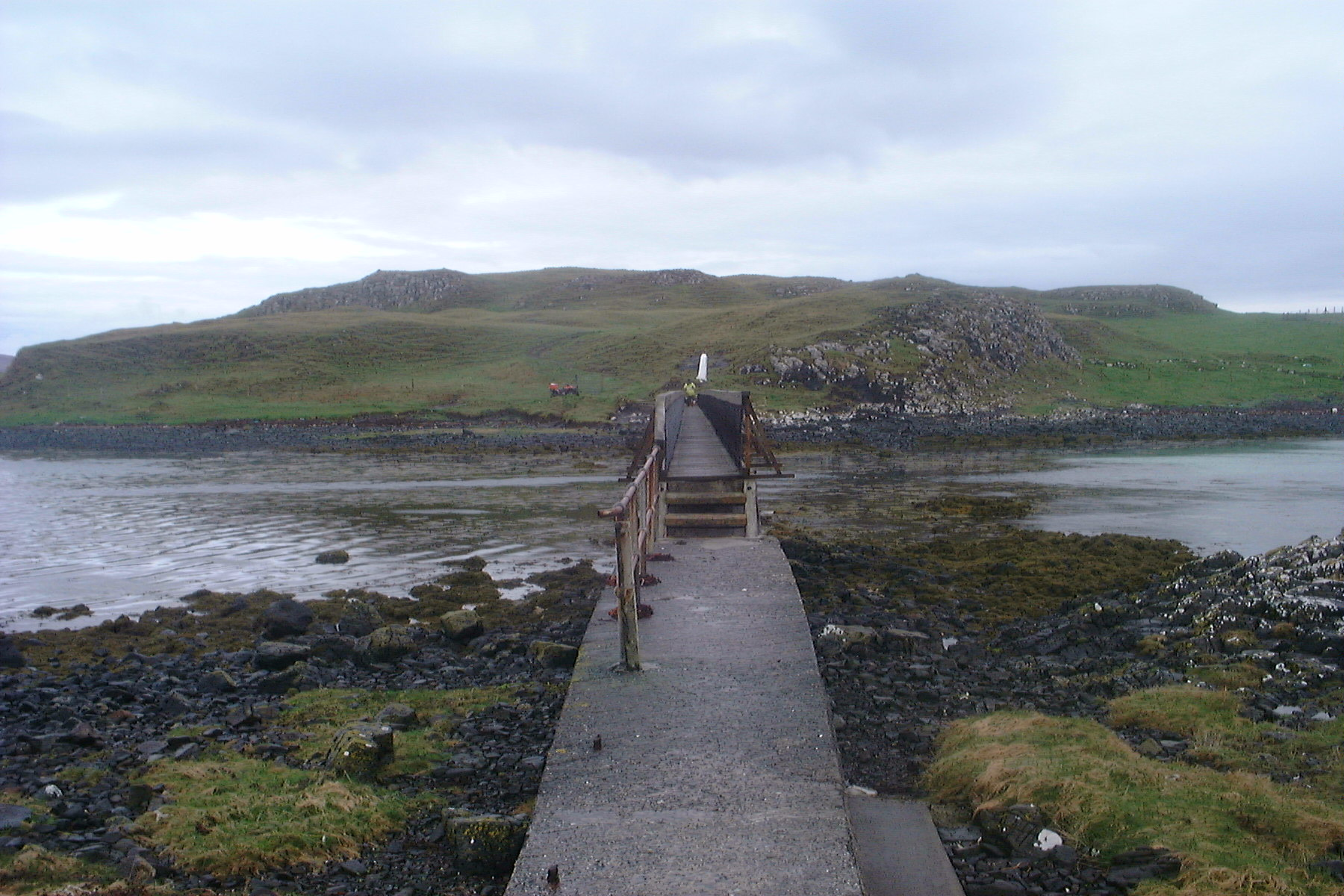
The footbridge to Sanday

In 1881, the post-clearance population was recorded as 119 (62 of whom were on Sanday); that year, MacNeil sold the island to Robert Thom, a Glaswegian shipbuilder. Thom carried out a programme of investment, including an oak pier, a footbridge to Sanday, and a Presbyterian Church, St Columba's (though the population remained mostly Roman Catholic). In 1889, counties were formally created in Scotland, on shrieval boundaries, by a dedicated Local Government Act; Canna therefore became part of the new county of Argyll. However, the Act established a boundary review, which decided, in 1891, to move Canna to the county of Inverness, where Eigg already sat.

The annual reports of the Fishery Board for Scotland provide an insight into the state of fishing from Canna in the years before the First World War. The catch typically consisted of herrings, eels, skate and lobsters.

Fishery Statistics

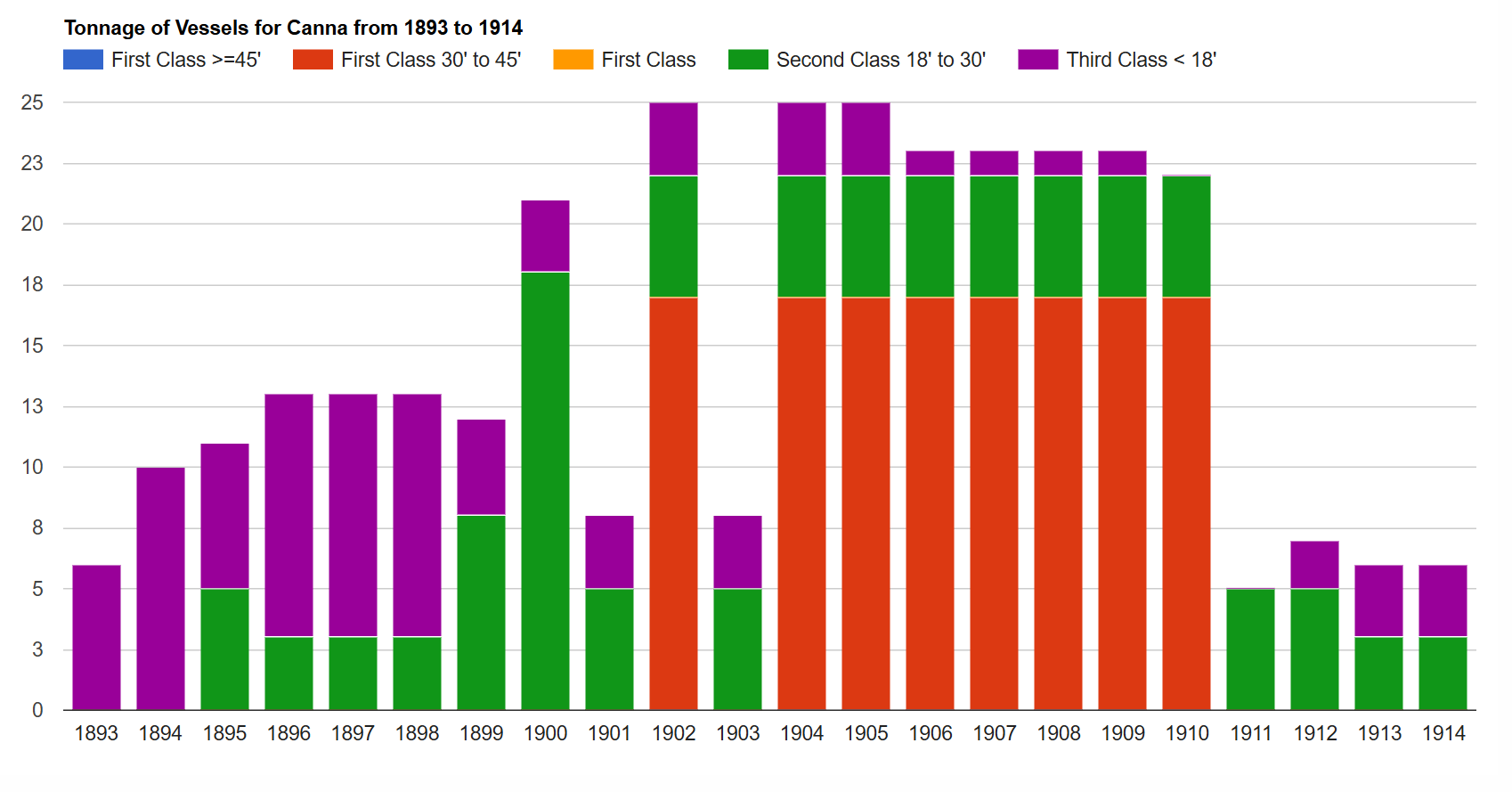
Tonnage of vessels

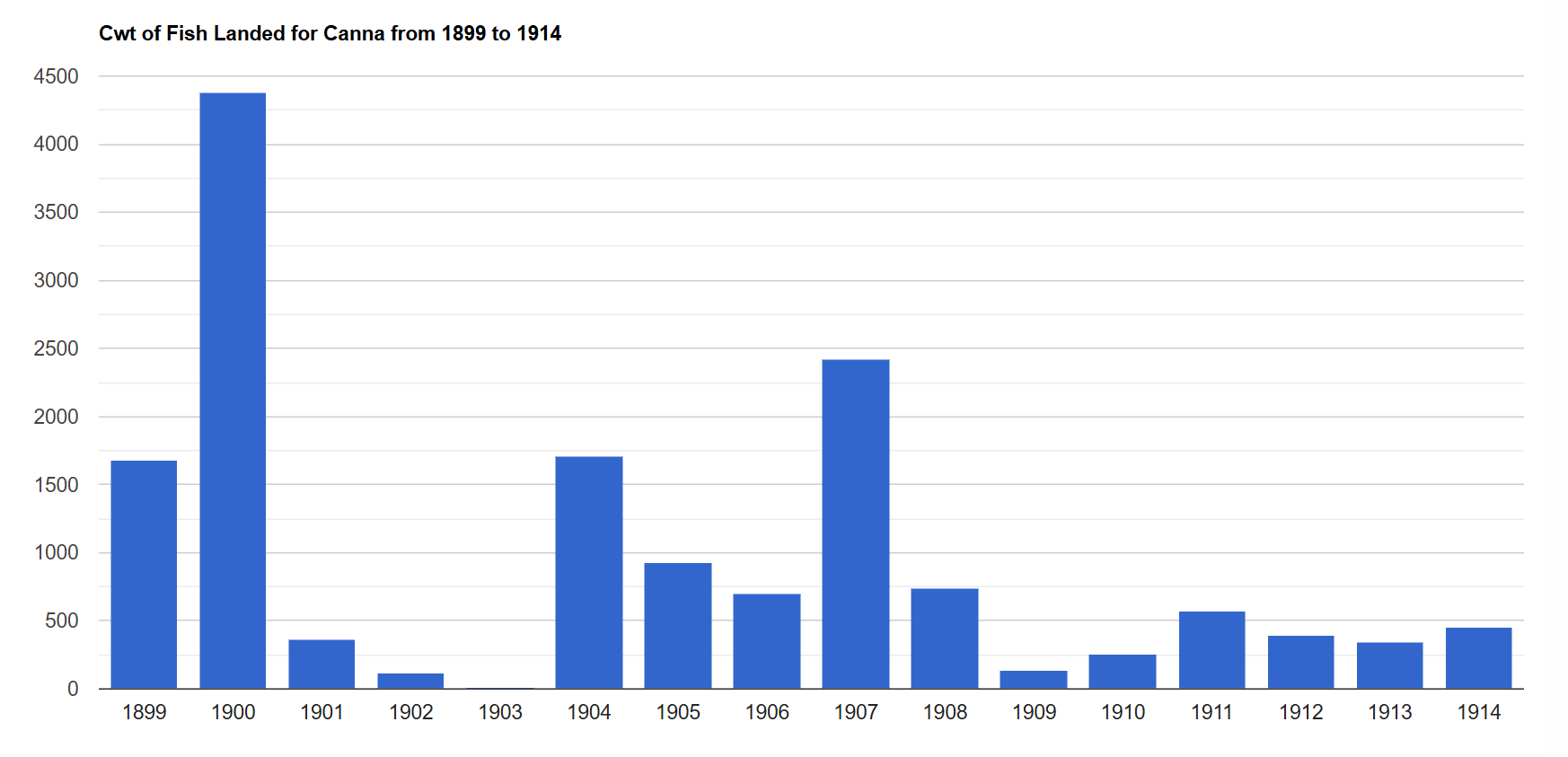
Cwt of fish landed

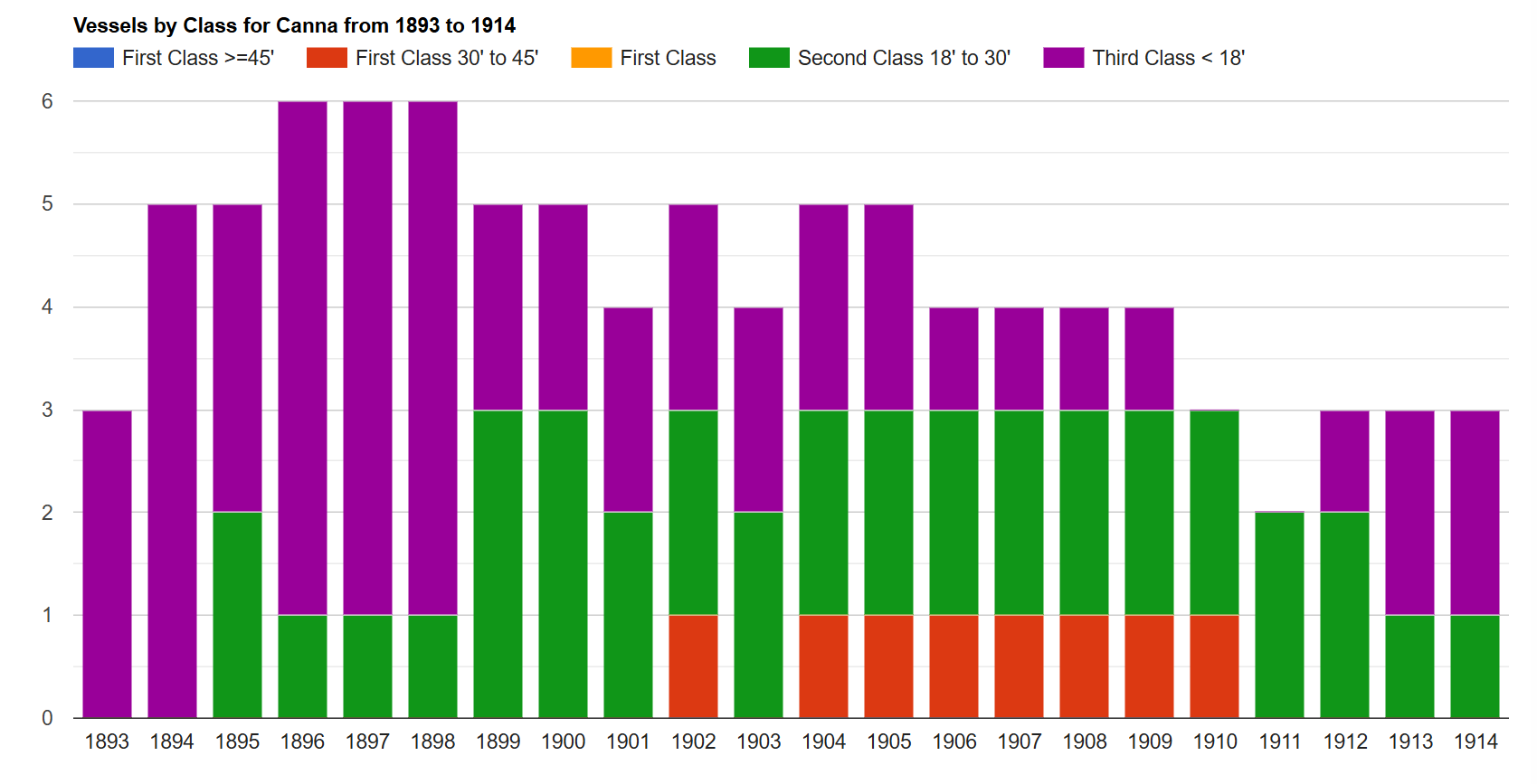
Vessels by class

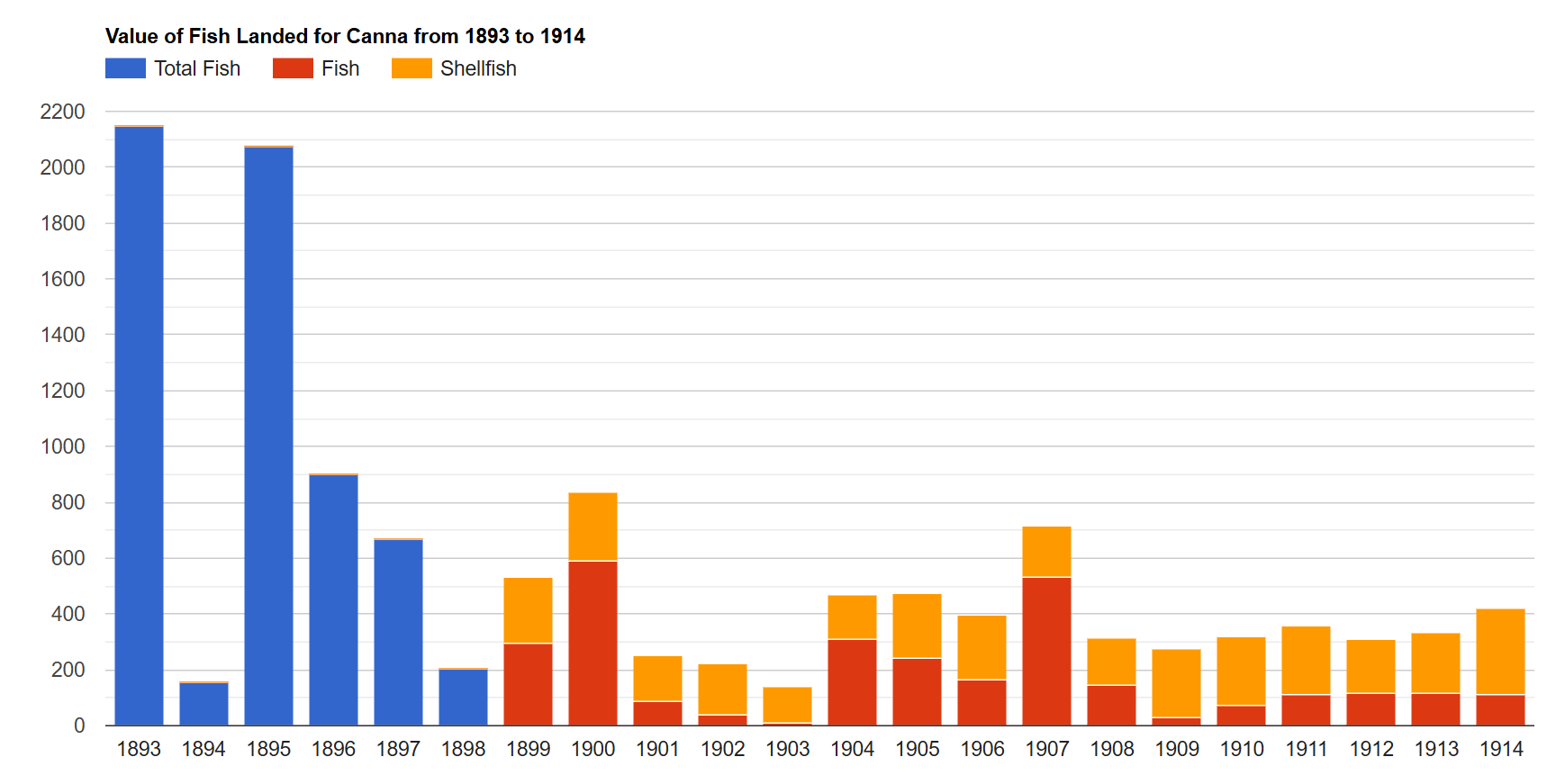
Value (£) of fish landed

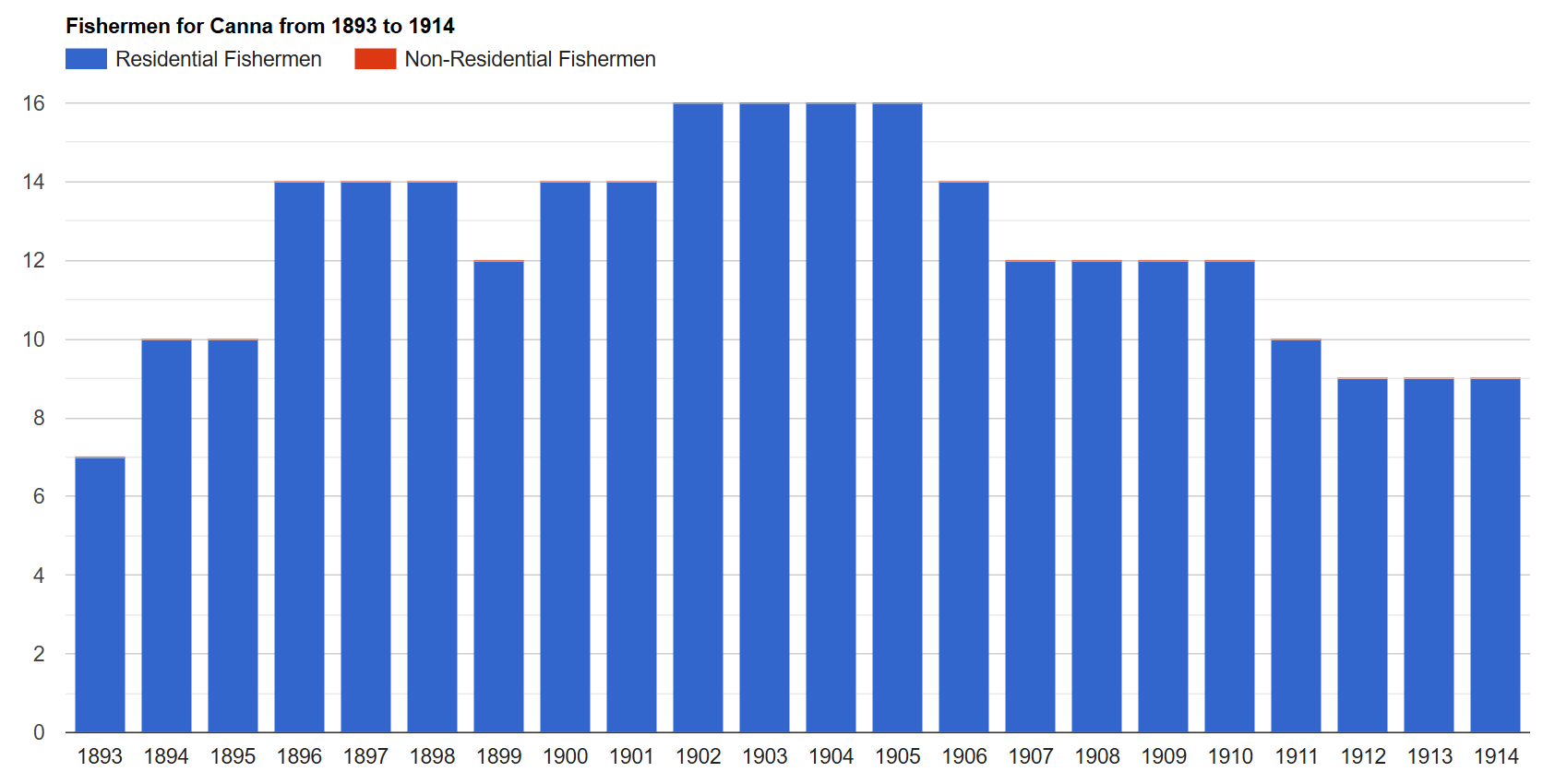
Fishermen

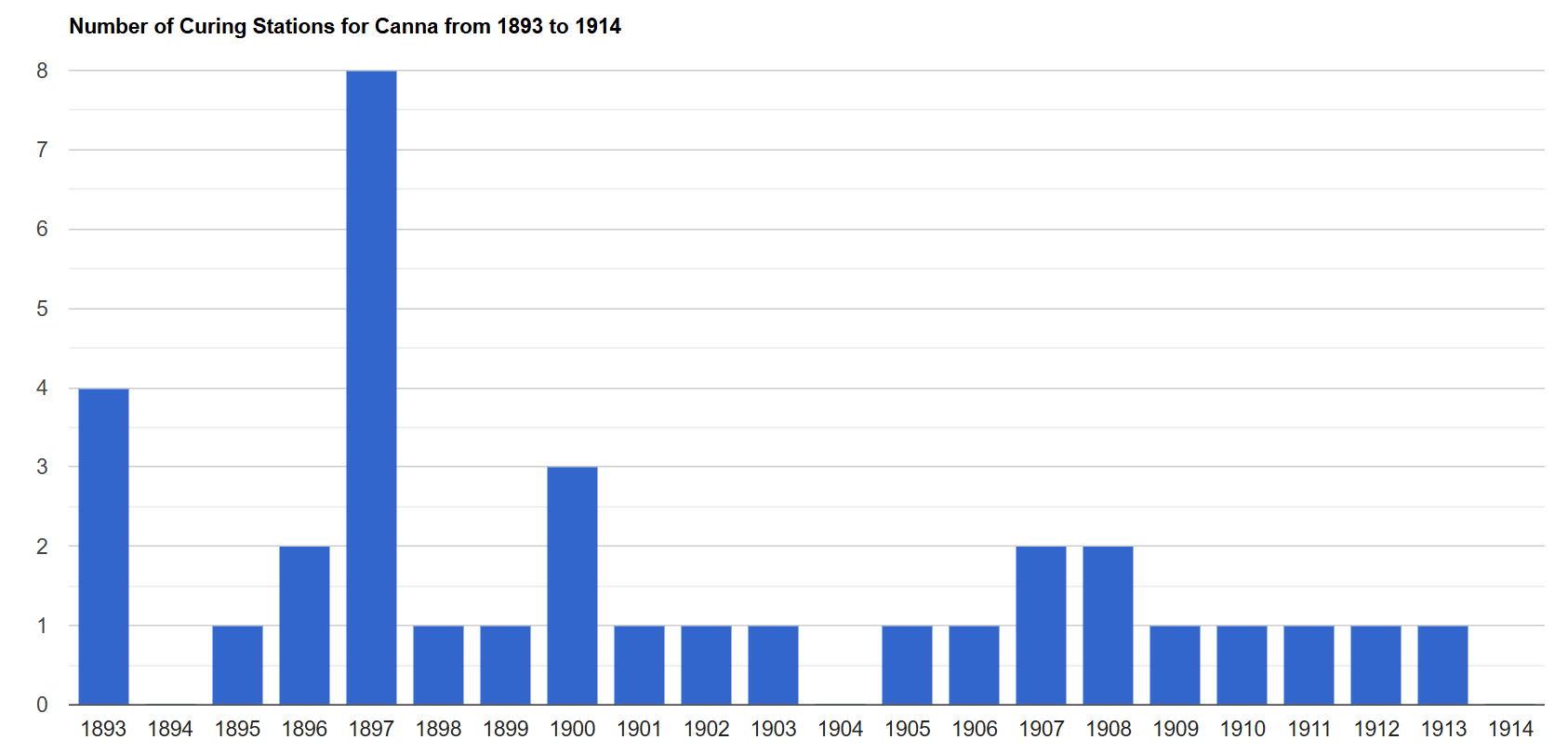
Number of curing stations

In 1938, Thom's family sought a sympathetic buyer, selling Canna to John Lorne Campbell, who organised the island as a farm and nature reserve, while transforming Canna House into a private archive of Scottish Gaelic literature, history, and folklore. Campbell lived on Canna until his death in 1996, but donated the island to the National Trust in 1981. In the 1970s, local government reforms abolished the County of Inverness, and moved Canna into Highland.

Campbell's American-born wife and fellow folksong collector Margaret Fay Shaw, remained at Canna House until her own death in 2004, at the age of 101. In the following year a cull against brown rats was ordered, for they had hitherto been allowed to expand to enormous numbers, and now threatened rare Manx shearwaters and human health; Canna is now rat-free.

Some film footage that was recorded by Margaret Fay Shaw in the 1930s and 1940s became part of Solas, a film by Canna House archivist, Fiona J Mackenzie, based on Shaw's life. It was first exhibited in spring 2019.

==== Stamps ====
A single local stamp was issued for Canna in 1958 by then-laird John Lorne Campbell. The stamp shows Compass Hill and two Manx shearwaters, a seabird found in profusion on the island. Their use is optional and all proceeds from the sale – at the island farm and post office — go to the Shipwrecked Mariners Society.

=== Overview of population trends ===
There are population records going back to the 16th century, the earliest of which combine Canna and Sanday. Following the clearances, population numbers remained fairly stable at around 20 to 30 during the second half of the 20th century, but by the time of the 2001 census had dwindled to 6 (or including Sanday, 12).

Year	c. 1595	1728	1750	1755	1764	1768	1772	1794	1807	1821	1831	1841	1851	1861	1881	1891	1931	1961	1981	1991	2001	2011	2022
Canna population															57	40	40	24	11	20	6	12	9
Sanday population															62	62	20	0	7	0	6	9	4
Total population	84-100	c.253	210	231	253	233	220	304	300	436	264	255	238	127	119	102	60	24	18	20	12	21	13

== Transport ==
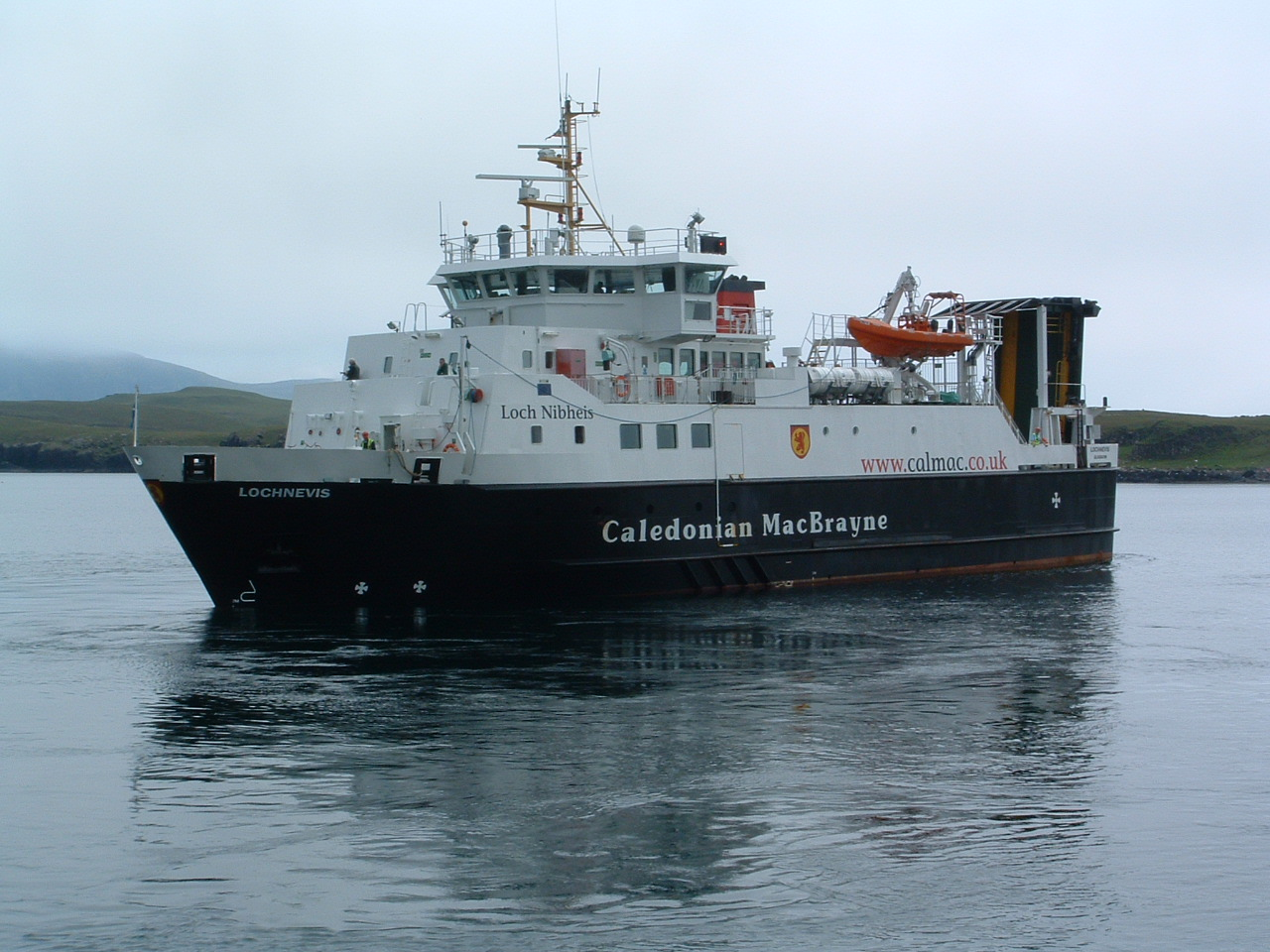
Lochnevis calls at Canna

A large natural harbour is formed between Canna and Sanday. The pier on Canna and those of the other Small Isles, was rebuilt and enlarged in 2005. This is used by the Caledonian MacBrayne ferry, MV Lochnevis, which links Canna, and the neighbouring Small Isles of Rùm, Eigg and Muck, to the mainland port of Mallaig (2 1/2 hours away). Lochnevis is capable of carrying motor vehicles, although National Trust permission is required to land them. The harbour is sheltered. It is the only deep harbour in the Small Isles, and is very popular with west coast yachting traffic out of Oban and Arisaig.

== Recent developments ==
=== Invasive species ===
==== Rat problem ====
In September 2005, it was reported that the population of brown rats on the island had grown to 10,000 and was causing such problems to both the human population and the birdlife, particularly the rare Manx shearwaters, that a complete cull would take place. Because the mice on the island are believed to be a rare and distinct subspecies of woodmouse, a breeding population of mice was removed beforehand by the Royal Zoological Society of Scotland (RZSS) so that the cull could use rodenticide. By the end of 2006 it was believed that Canna was rat-free and during that summer there was also an encouraging increase in the number of breeding puffins and razorbills; Manx shearwaters were nesting for the first time since 1997.

==== Rabbit overpopulation ====
Within four years of the eradication of rats, a rabbit overpopulation problem was reported. The pests caused damage to archaeological monuments, such as an Iron Age mound and stone remains from the Clearances, as well as the islanders' vegetable gardens. The island's only restaurant started serving rabbit meat in pies and with cranberry and pistachio. By 2013 rabbit numbers were estimated to have risen to 16,000 and the following year a team of six men engaged in a three-month cull of them, using traps, dogs, ferrets and guns to kill 9,000 rabbits.

=== Call for families for Canna ===
In October 2006, the National Trust for Scotland decided to invite two families to rent properties on the island, in an effort to attract new skills and spirit to the island community. The invitation was mainly aimed at people with "skills in building, plumbing and gardening". The call was global and over 400 responses were received, from places as varied as Germany, Sweden, India and Dubai. From these, Sheila Gunn and John Clare were chosen to move to Canna during summer 2007. They were joined in early 2008 by two more incomers, Neil and Deborah Baker, from Llannon in the Gwendraeth Valley in South Wales. As a gardener, Neil Baker's job was to restore the fine but overgrown gardens of Canna House. Since then, a further cottage was restored and was expected to be occupied by newcomers in 2011. However, in June 2011 it was announced that 12 people were planning to leave the island: Clare and Gunn, the Bakers and their two children, and schoolteacher Eilidh Soe-Paing, her husband and four children. The school would close, temporarily at least, as there would no longer be any school-age children on the island.

=== Gaelic Study Centre ===
The church, which is also owned by the National Trust for Scotland, was restored and converted into a hostel and study centre by the Hebridean Trust. This project was undertaken at the invitation of the owners. The centre is linked to the archive of Scottish Gaelic language, literature, and culture that was collected by literary scholar and former owner of Canna and Sanday, John Lorne Campbell. It was successfully completed and opened in 2001 by Princess Anne. Subsequently, there was water ingress, which caused damage to the interior. This challenge is in the hands of the National Trust for Scotland.

=== Crime ===
The island enjoys a near-zero crime rate, with only a handful of crimes recorded in the last several decades.

=== Restoration of Canna House ===
In May 2020, the National Trust US Foundation reported that major renovations were underway at Canna House and its gardens; the facility was originally expected to reopen in 2021. Due to the COVID-19 pandemic, however, the restoration was delayed, and finally opened in June 2025.

In 2026 the restored house was one of ten winners of the annual Royal Incorporation of Architects in Scotland (RIAS) awards. The judges described the restoration as an "exemplary model of conservation".

== Gallery ==
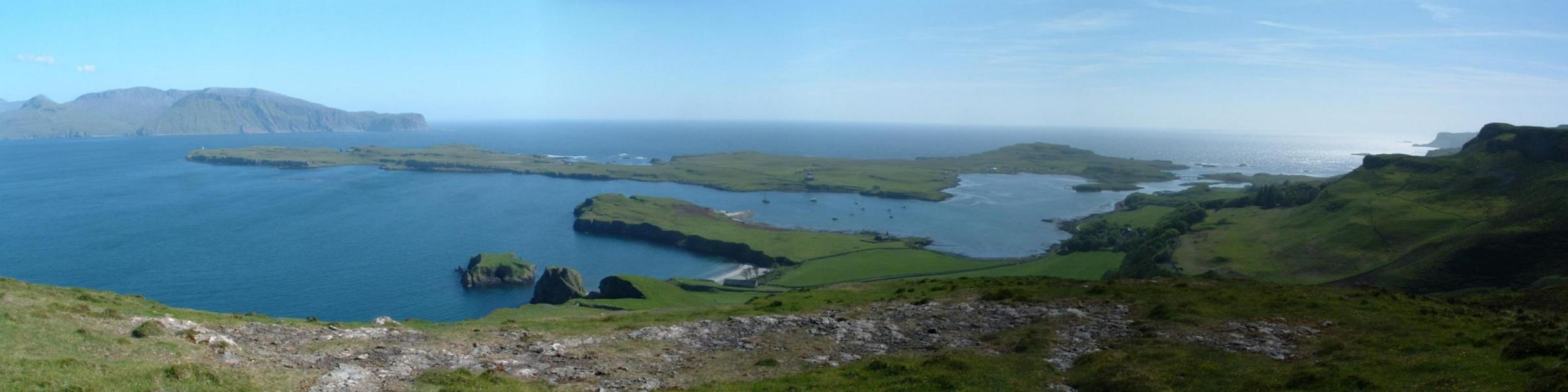
Panorama taken from Compass Hill on Canna, overlooking Canna Bay and Sanday towards Rùm.

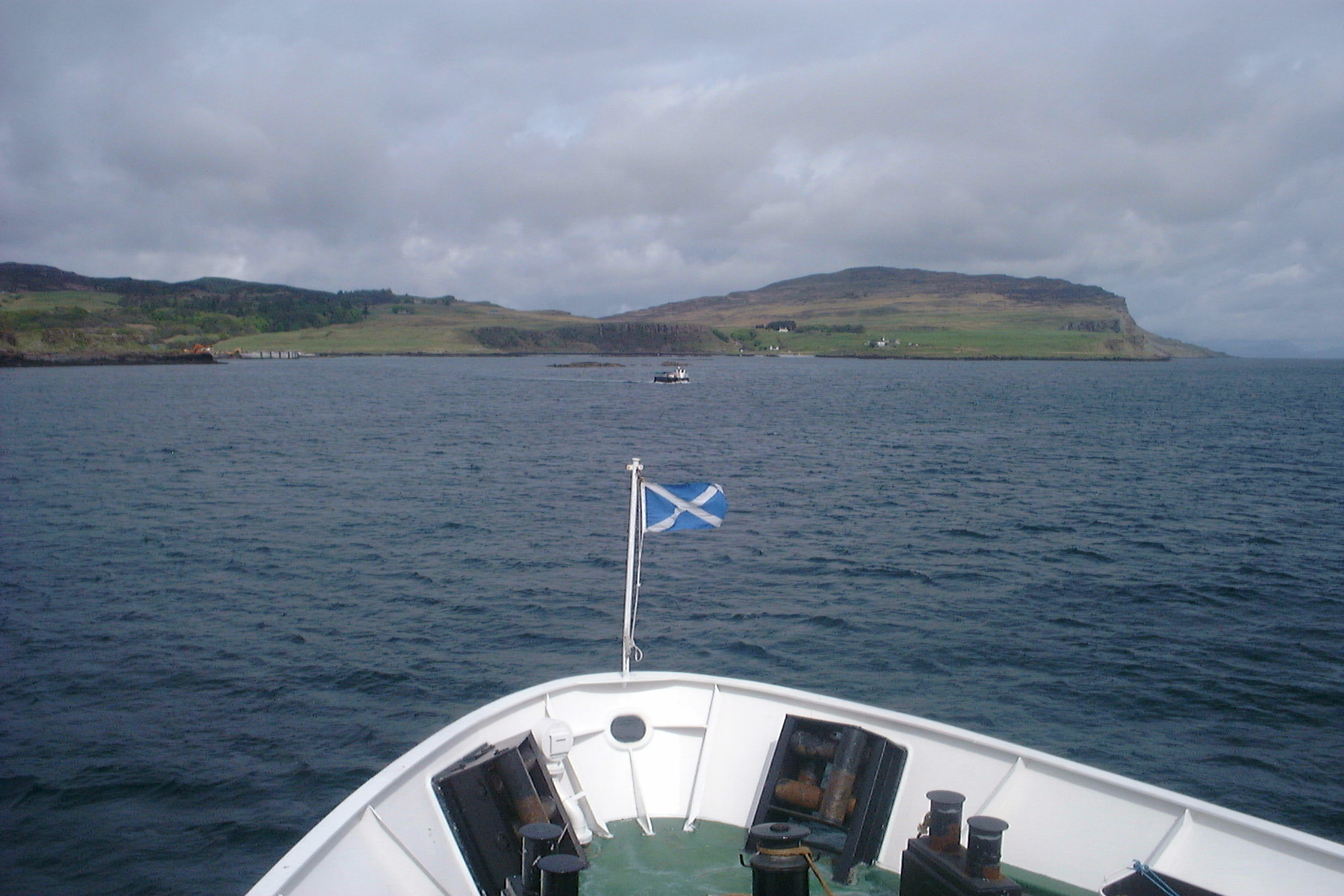
View from ferry approaching Canna Island

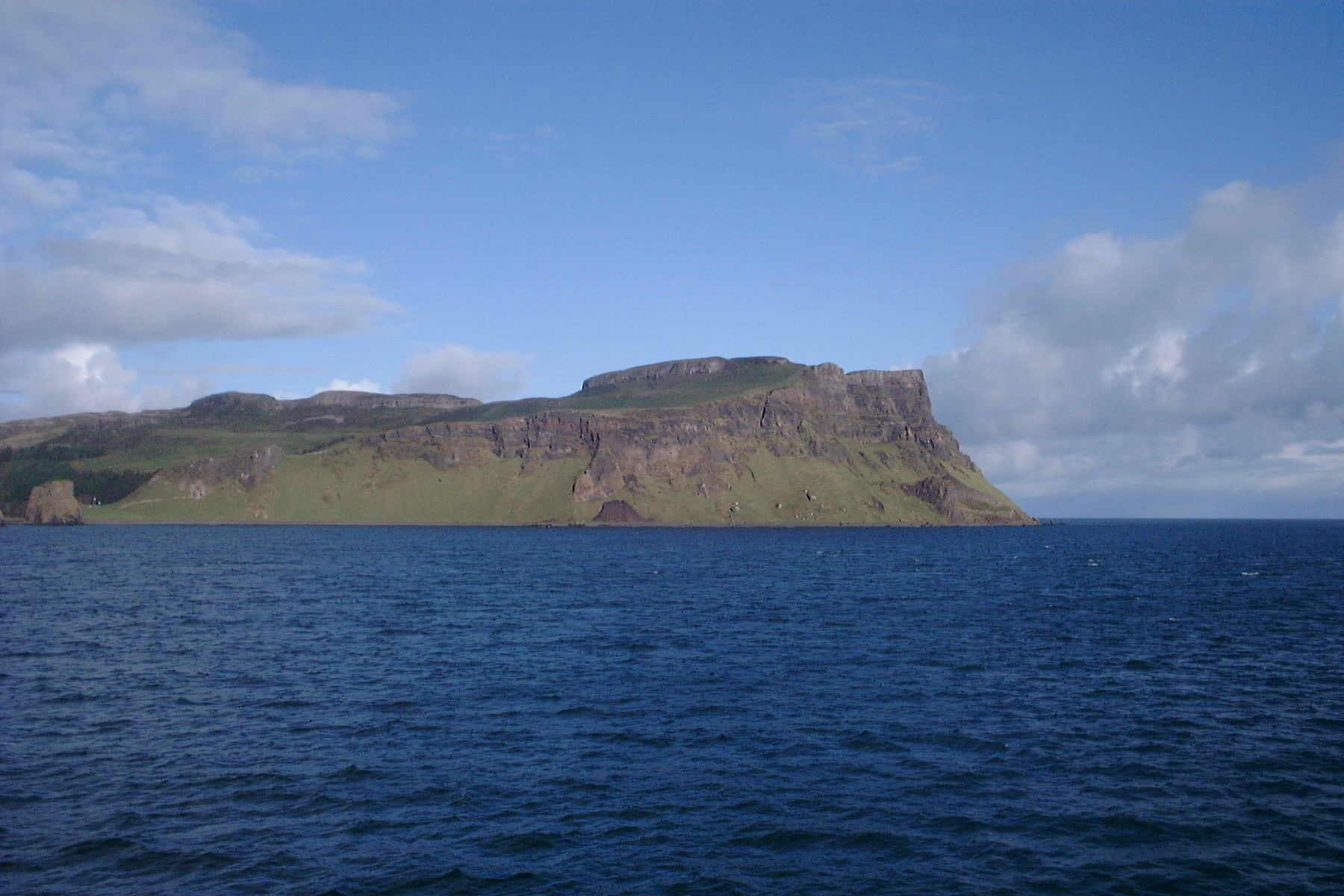
Extreme east of Canna Island with Compass Hill. In the left the stack Dùn Mòr.

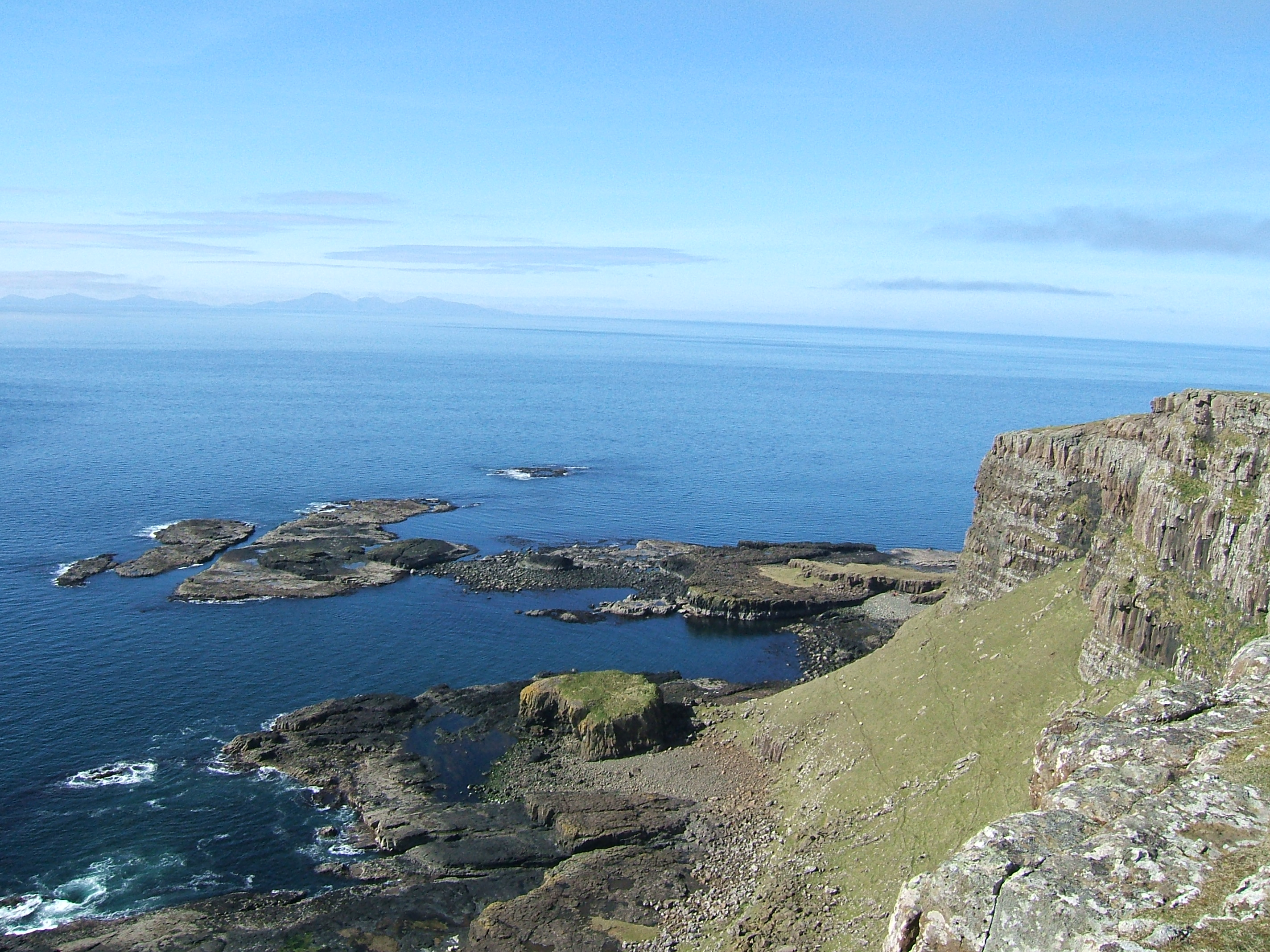
Looking north over Garrisdale point, western cliffs of Canna Island

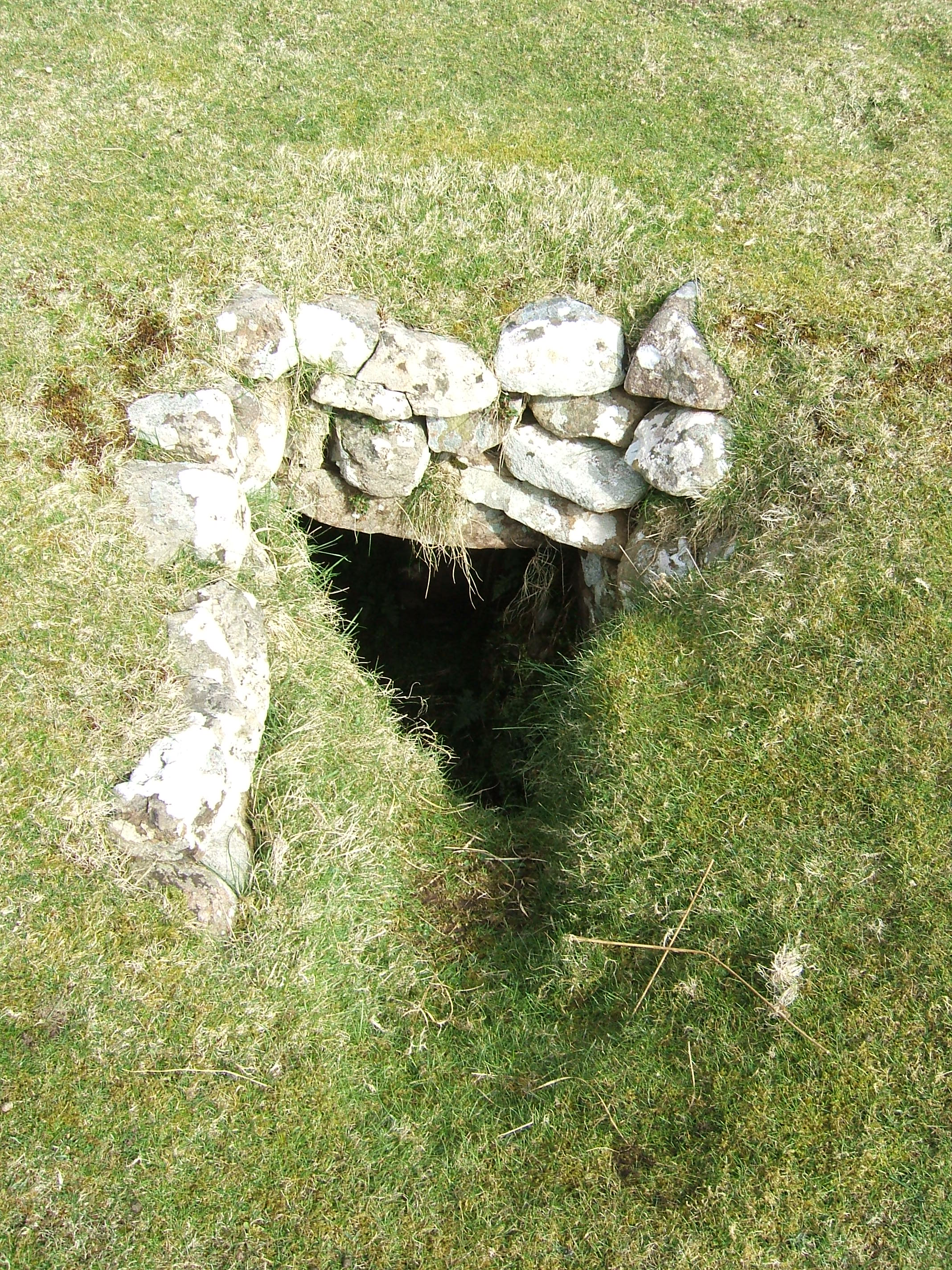
Neolithic souterrain Canna Island

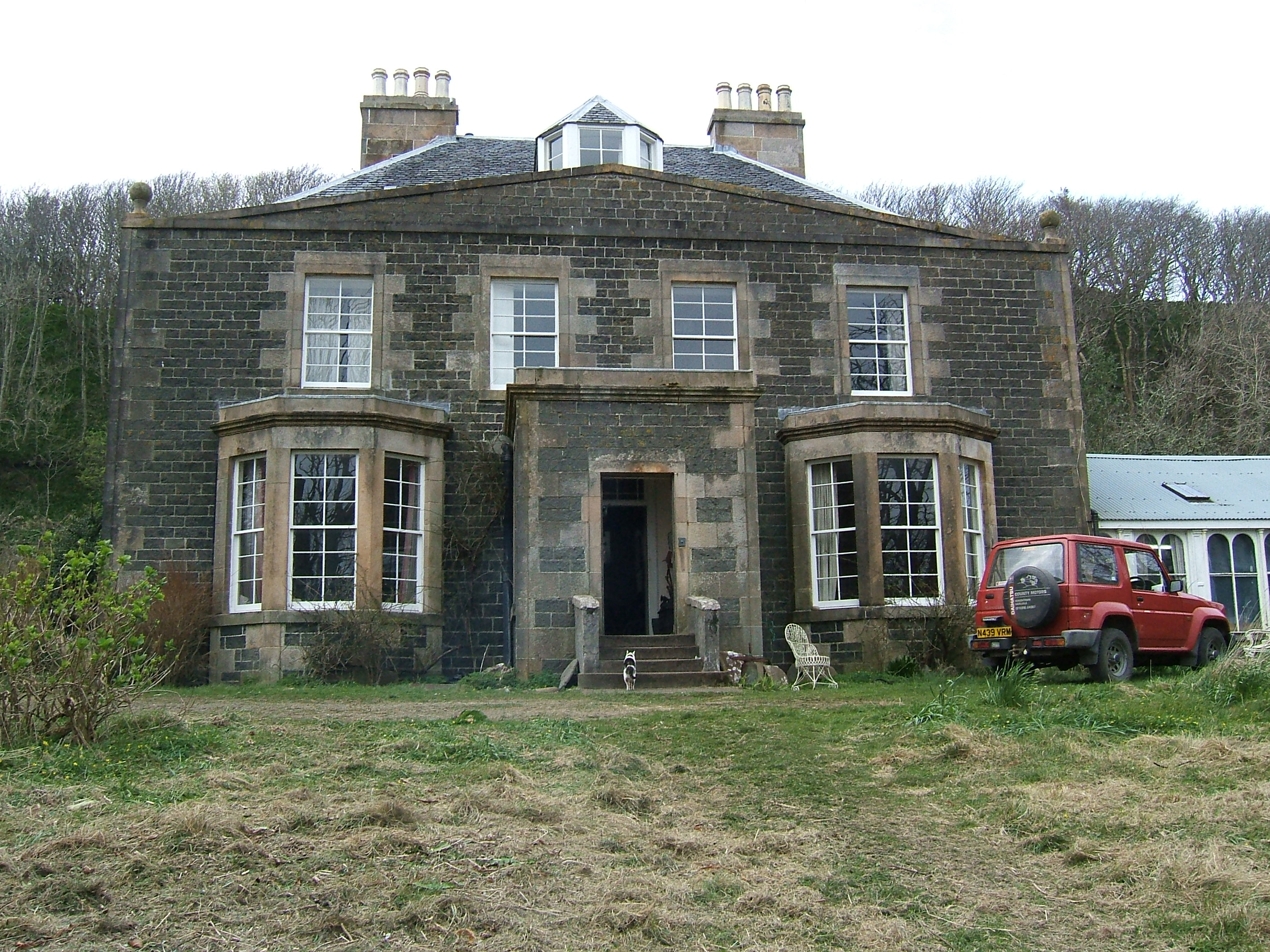
Canna House

== See also ==
- List of islands of Scotland
- Religion of the Yellow Stick
- List of lighthouses in Scotland
- List of Northern Lighthouse Board lighthouses

== Bibliography ==
- Banks, Noel, (1977) Six Inner Hebrides. Newton Abbott: David & Charles. ISBN 0-7153-7368-4
- Campell, John Lorne (1984) Canna, the Story of a Hebridean Island. Edinburgh: Canongate.
- Haswell-Smith, Hamish (2004). The Scottish Islands. Edinburgh: Canongate. ISBN 978-1-84195-454-7.
- Monro, Sir Donald (1549) Description of the Western Isles of Scotland. William Auld. Edinburgh - 1774 edition.
- Mac an Tàilleir, Iain (2003) Goireasan Cànain / Language Resources - Tadhail is Ionnsaich : Pàrlamaid na h-Alba. (pdf) Pàrlamaid na h-Alba. Retrieved 26 October 2025.
- Perman, Ray (2010) "The Man Who Gave Away His Island." Edinburgh: Birlinn.
- Rixson, Dennis (2001) The Small Isles: Canna, Rum, Eigg and Muck. Edinburgh: Birlinn. ISBN 1-84158-154-2
- Shaw, Margaret Fay (1999) From the Alleghenies to the Hebrides Edinburgh: Canongate.
