= Bullough Mausoleum =

Scottish mausoleum

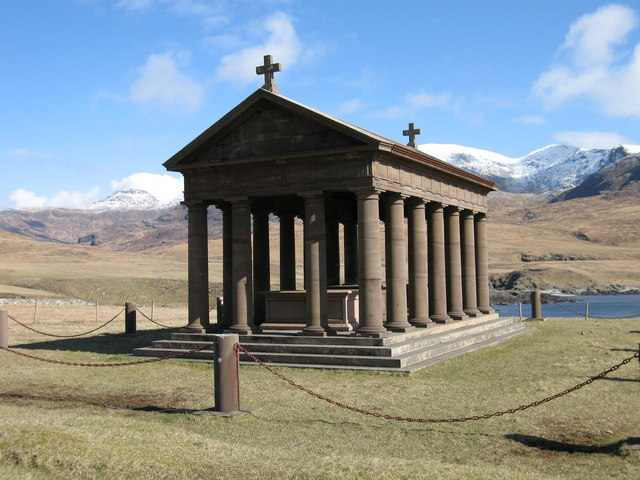
- The mausoleum in 2006

- Location in the Small Isles
- 56.97507°N 6.38517°W

Listed Building – Category B
- Designated: 5 October 1971
- Reference no.: LB14122

The Bullough Mausoleum stands near the depopulated village of Harris on the island of Rùm, one of the Small Isles off the west coast of Scotland. It was built in around 1901 by Sir George Bullough, a textile tycoon from Lancashire, as a resting place for his father, and as a family mausoleum. It replaced an earlier tomb which Sir George demolished. The mausoleum is protected as a category B listed building.

== History and description ==
The Isle of Rùm was leased by John Bullough (1838–1891), a textile-mill owner from Lancashire, in 1879 and bought outright by him in 1888. On his death in 1891, his son George Bullough, engaged the architect William James Morley to construct a mausoleum overlooking the sea on the western side of the island. (Note: John Bullough was originally interred in the family vault at Christ Church, Accrington, Lancashire, but his body was moved to Rùm in August 1891.) (Note: On his inheritance George Bullough also undertook the construction of Kinloch Castle on the eastern side of the island.) Elaborately decorated with ceramic tiling, the building fell from favour when one of Bullough's guests unflatteringly suggested the tiling was "redolent of a public lavatory in Waterloo Station", and Bullough had the structure blown up. (Note: Remnants of the first mausoleum's ceramic tiling, carrying heraldic imagery, remain at the site.) It was replaced by a Doric temple, constructed in the early 20th century. The architect of the replacement structure is uncertain; some sources suggest James Miller, while Page & Page, the architectural firm responsible for a redevelopment survey in the early 21st century, conclude that the firm of Leeming & Leeming, whom Bullough employed to design Kinloch Castle, were also responsible for many of the estate buildings, likely including the mausoleum.

On his own death in 1939, Sir George was interred in the mausoleum alongside his father. Kinloch Castle and the island were held by trustees, who sold the estate in 1957, retaining only the family mausoleum. In 1967 Sir George's widow Monica was also buried there after her death at the age of 98. By the 21st century, the condition of the mausoleum had deteriorated and a major programme of restoration was undertaken in 2006.

The Bullough Masoleum is designed as a tetrastyle Doric temple. It is built of polished sandstone and consists of a roof supported by an open peristyle (arcade) of 18 columns on a plinth. The tomb of John Bullough is also of polished sandstone, while those of George and Monica Bullough are of pink granite. The Page & Page report describes it as a "not architecturally brilliant essay in classicism, though it is admirably competent. Its rugged location, however, elevates its status immeasurably in its interaction with its wild and lonely setting". John Gifford, in his Highland and Islands volume in The Buildings of Scotland series, considered the building, "rather stolid", while agreeing that its location was “spectacular”. The mausoleum is a category B listed building.

== Gallery ==
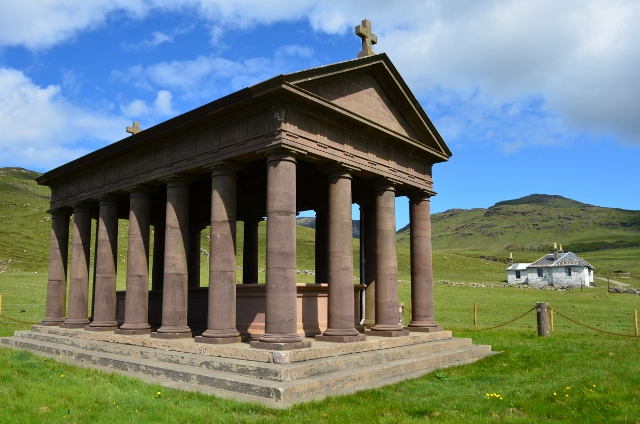
an oblique view

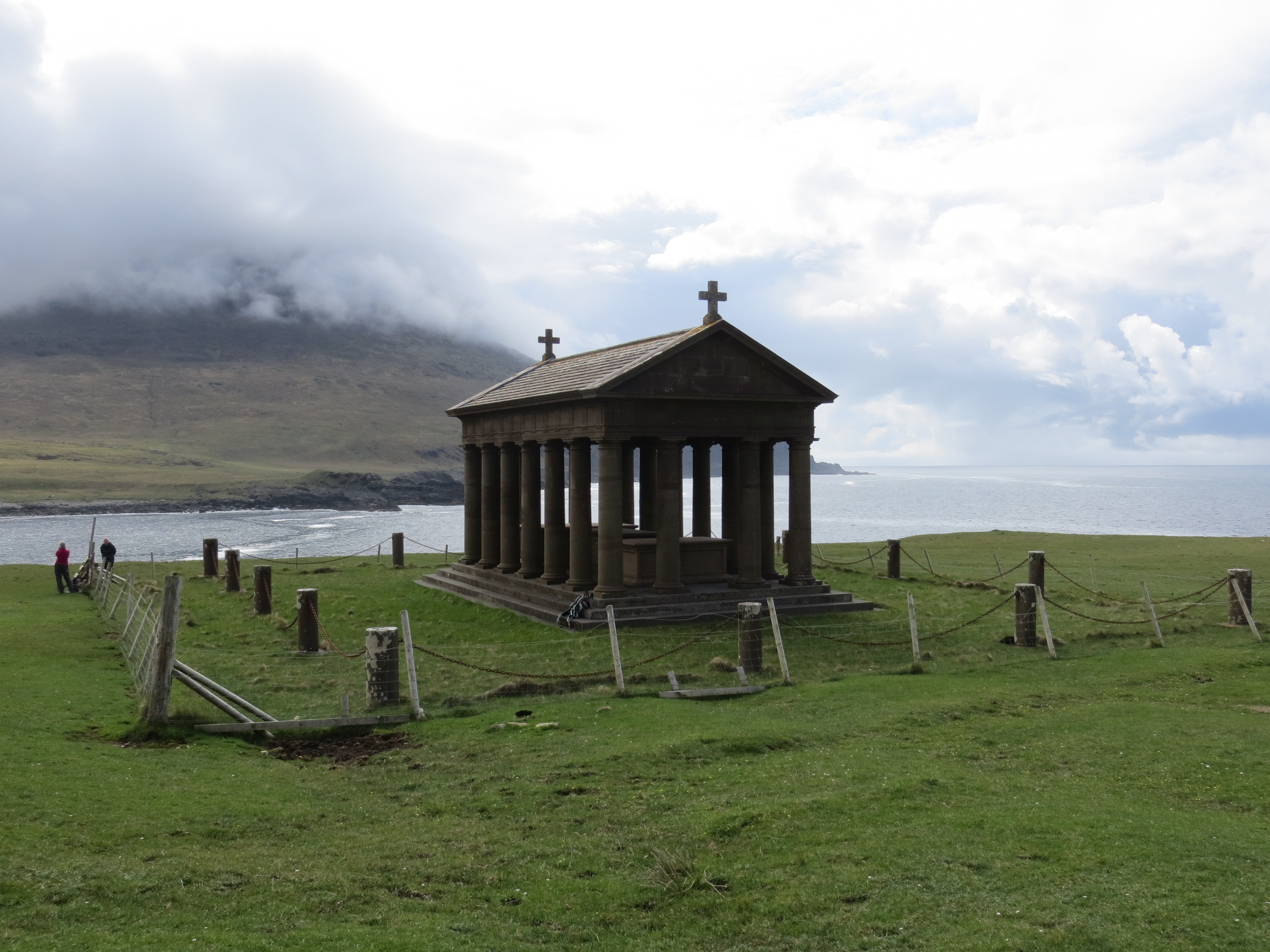
a seaward view

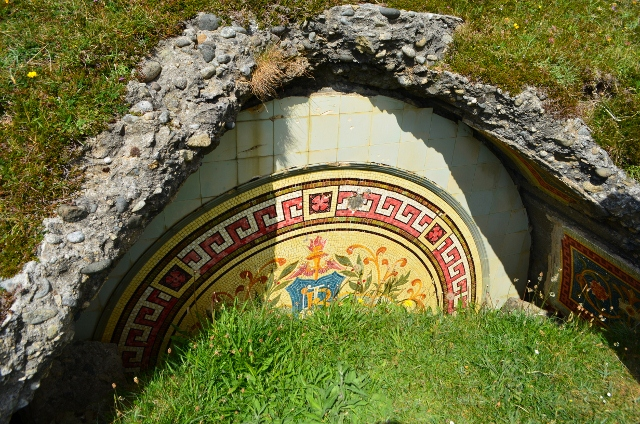
a remnant of tiling from the first mausoleum

== Sources ==
- Gifford, John (1992). Highland and Islands. The Buildings of Scotland. London: Penguin Books. ISBN 978-0-140-71071-7.
- Glen, Michael H. (1999). Rum National Nature Reserve: Kinloch Castle (PDF). Battleby: Scotland Natural Heritage Publications. ISBN 978-1-853-97043-6. Archived from the original (PDF) on 4 March 2016.
- Page & Page, Architects (2002). Kinloch Castle - Proposals for redevelopment (PDF). Scottish Natural Heritage. Archived from the original (PDF) on 24 September 2015.
