= Leeming & Leeming =

British architectural firm, established in 1872

Leeming & Leeming was an architectural firm established in Halifax, Yorkshire in 1872 and later based in London. Its two partners were John Leeming (1849–1931) and his brother Joseph Leeming (1850–1929). John had previously been assistant to Adams and Kelly in Leeds. Both brothers became Fellows of the Royal Institute of British Architects in 1901.

Their works include a luxurious mansion, Kinloch Castle, on the Isle of Rum, Scotland, commissioned by its leaseholder, Sir George Bullough, a textile tycoon from Lancashire whose father bought Rum as his summer residence and shooting estate. Construction began in 1897, and was completed in 1906. The castle is now Category A-listed by Historic Environment Scotland.
