= Adams & Kelly =

19th-century architectural firm in Leeds

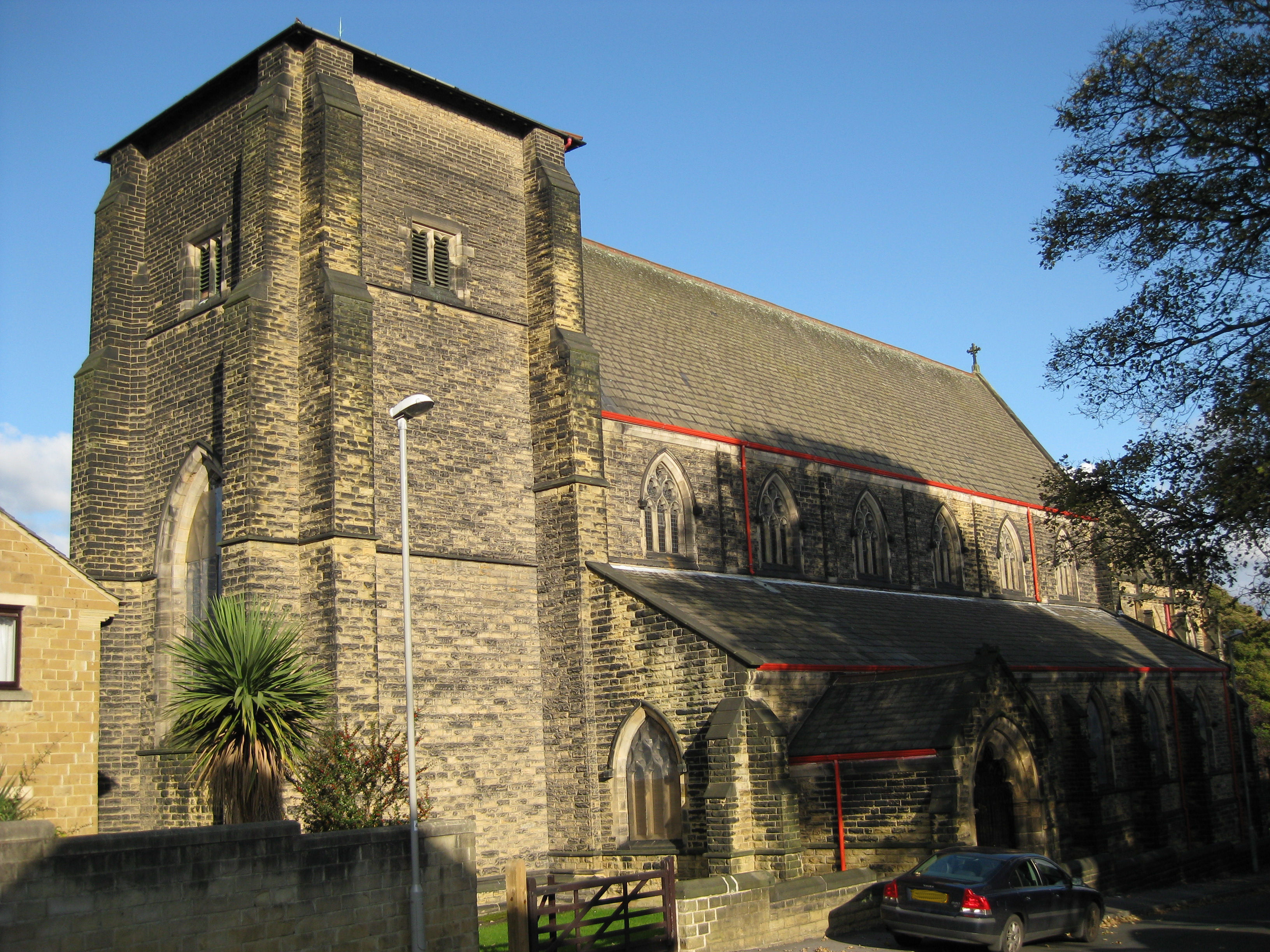
- St Martin's Church, Potternewton (1879–1881)

Practice information
- Key architects: Richard Life Adams; John Kelly
- Founded: 1860s
- Dissolved: 1880s
- Location: Leeds

Adams & Kelly was an architectural practice based at 18 Park Row, Leeds, Yorkshire, England. It was a partnership between Richard Life Adams (1840–1883) and John Kelly (1840–1904).

== Works ==
Adams & Kelly's work includes the former Church Institute in Leeds, on the corner of Albion Place and Lands Lane, a building in Gothic Revival style which was built between 1866 and 1868. According to Leach and Pevsner it once had "a lecture hall for 800, a library with 10,000 volumes and walls painted with frescoes of the saints". The building was converted for commercial and retail use in 1980.

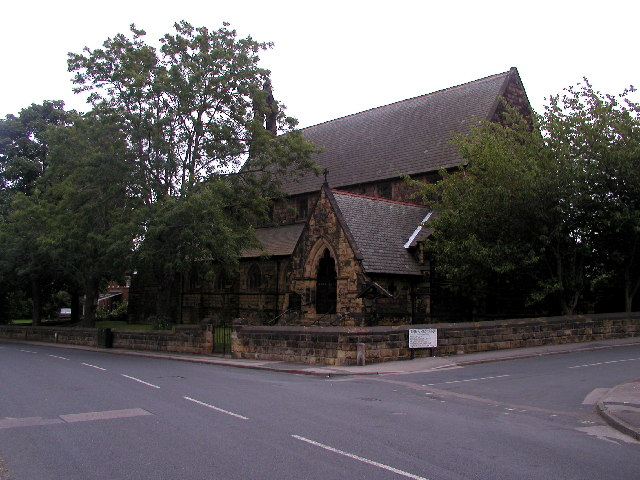
St. Mary Magdalene Church, Altofts, West Yorkshire (1873–90)

Adams & Kelly also designed several schools and churches, including St Martin's Church, Potternewton (1879–1881). The church, just off Chapeltown Road, was built of stone from local quarries. The original design included a tall steeple, and building of the tower began in 1897, but it could not be completed as a weakness had developed in the foundations.

The firm designed the church of St John, Newtown, Leeds (1866–68), St Matthew, Kingston upon Hull, Yorkshire (1870), Holy Trinity, Armley Hall, Yorkshire (1870–72), All Saints, South Acton, London (1871–72), Christ Church, Gateshead, County Durham (1868–73), Christ Church, Upper Armley, Leeds (1869–74) and St Mary Magdalene Church, Altofts, West Yorkshire (1873–90).

With architects Alfred Jackson Martin of Darlington and Eugene C Clephan of Stockton-on-Tees they designed the Church of St Peter in Stockton, County Durham (1878–81).

The partnership drew up plans in 1885 for a new Church of St Paul at Shireshead, near Forton, Lancashire. The scheme was shelved in favour of the building of a new church, St James', which was subsequently designed by Kelly & Birchall and built in 1887–1890.

Adams & Kelly also worked on the church of St Mary of Bethany, New Wortley, Leeds, which was completed by Kelly & Birchall. Built in 1885 at a cost of £5,600, it featured a spire of 135 feet and a brick lined interior. St Mary of Bethany was demolished in 1975.

== People ==
Adams & Kelly employed, as an assistant, John Leeming (1849–1931), who in 1872 went into partnership with his brother Joseph as Leeming & Leeming, who were responsible for the design and construction of Kinloch Castle on the Isle of Rùm in Scotland.

In 1886, three years after the death of Adams, Kelly went into partnership with Edward Birchall as Kelly & Birchall.

== See also ==
- Kelly & Birchall
- Architecture of Leeds
