= Hay (Scottish ploughman) =

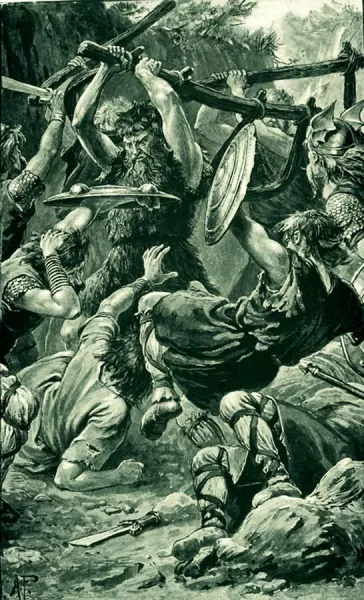
- Depiction of the Battle of Luncarty, Hay is the bearded man in the center wielding a yoke
- Died: after 980
- Children: 2 known sons

Hay was a Scottish ploughman and knight of the Clan Hay who was involved in the Battle of Luncarty in 980.

== Battle of Luncarty ==
In 980, Danish Vikings, under the command of Harald I landed on the coast of Angus and started devastating Scotland. They started a siege on Perth, and when Kenneth II was informed of this, he immediately ordered his men to advance from Stirling toward the enemy. The Danish army was camped on a hill at Redgorton. The Scots, outnumbered and anxious for victory, charged at the Danes. The Danes held their ground and attacked the Scots with volleys of arrows, darts, anything they had. The battle was bloody and it was unsure who would win. The Danes led a countercharge which caused confusion and disarray amongst the Scottish lines. Kenneth ordered his men to retreat. A farmer named Hay, with his 2 sons, was working. Hay saw the retreating Scots, grabbed the yoke from his oxen’s neck, blocked their path of retreat, and beat any Scot who tried retreating. Hay cried out: 'Would you flee and become the slaves of heathen kings?!” The Scots replied with disagreement. “No, no! Turn back, turn back, and die rather as free men!” Hay cried out. This gave the Scots a new encouragement and determination. Kenneth ordered his men to charge at the Danes once again. Hay and his sons joined the charge. The Danes, believing reinforcements for the Scots had arrived, retreated. Many of the retreating Danes drowned in the River Tay.

== After Luncarty ==
Hay was brought to Kenneth, and Kenneth praised him for his works. Kenneth asked him: What can I do for you? What can I give to you as a reward for your great services?" and he replied: "Give me, sire, as much land as a falcon will fly over without alighting." A falcon flew 6 miles non stop, and Hay was granted that land. He and his sons were knighted and given coat of arms.
