= Pommern (horse) =

British-bred Thoroughbred racehorse

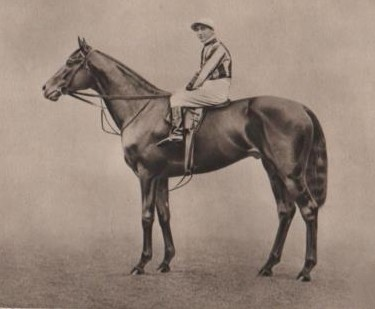
- Pommern with Steve Donoghue up.
- Sire: Polymelus
- Grandsire: Cyllene
- Dam: Merry Agnes
- Damsire: St. Hilaire
- Sex: Stallion
- Foaled: 1912
- Country: United Kingdom of Great Britain and Ireland
- Colour: Bay
- Breeder: Solomon B. Joel
- Owner: Solomon B. Joel
- Trainer: Charles Peck
- Record: 10: 7-1-0
- Earnings: £15,616

Major wins
- Imperial Produce Stakes (1914); Richmond Stakes (1914); 2000 Guineas Stakes (1915); Epsom Derby (1915); September Stakes (1915); June Stakes (1916)

Awards
- 11th English Triple Crown Champion (1915)

Pommern (1912–1935) was a British bred Thoroughbred racehorse and sire. In a racing career which lasted from 1914 to June 1916 he ran ten times and won seven races. As a three-year-old in 1915 he won the 2000 Guineas at Newmarket and the wartime substitutes for The Derby and the St. Leger Stakes to win a version of the English Triple Crown. After winning his only race as a four-year-old in 1916, he was retired to stud where he had limited success.

== Background ==
Pommern was an elegant, good-looking bay horse officially bred by his owner Solomon Joel who bought the mare Merry Agnes for 500 guineas in 1911 when she was already pregnant with the future Derby winner. The mating of Merry Agnes and Joel's stallion Polymelus was actually arranged by the mare's previous owner Sir Alan Johnstone. Polymelus was a five-time British Champion sire and a horse that Thoroughbred Heritage calls one [of] the most influential British stallions of the 20th century. Merry Agnes, was by St. Hilaire whose sire St. Simon, was one of the most successful sires in the history of British racing. Pommern was inbred to the stallion Hampton (see below). Pommern was reportedly named after a German friend of Mr Joel. Given the period, the name was rather unfortunate, as it was also borne by a German battleship which was erroneously reported to have been sunk by British submarines in July 1915. Joel sent his colt to his private trainer Charles Peck at Newmarket, Suffolk.

== Race record ==
=== 1914: two-year-old season ===
Pommern showed little form in his first two races, finishing unplaced in races at Royal Ascot in June and at Newmarket's July meeting. He showed much improved form in the Richmond Stakes at Goodwood later in July, winning easily by two lengths from nine opponents. In October he ran in the £3,000 Imperial Produce Stakes at Kempton in which he was set to receive eight pounds from King Priam, who up till that time had been regarded as the best two-year-old of the season. Pommern dominated the race, leading from the start and pulling clear inside the final furlong to win by four lengths from King Priam with Follow Up third. After these successes, the leading jockey Steve Donoghue was contracted to ride the horse in the following year's Classics

=== 1915: three-year-old season ===
The First World War led to a restricted and restructured racing schedule in 1915, with many racecourses being used by the military or closed to conserve resources. As many important races could not be run at their usual venues, wartime substitute races were run at alternative courses, with Newmarket being particularly favoured.

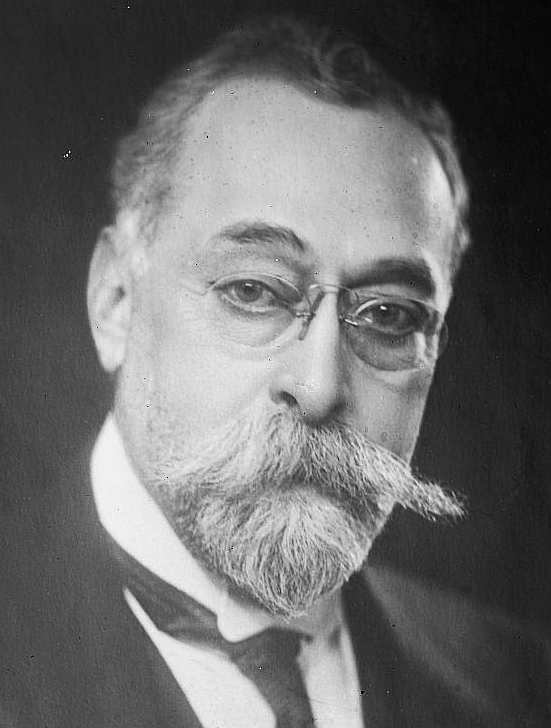
Solomon Joel, the mining tycoon who owned and bred Pommern

Joel took Pommern's prospects for the Classics seriously, paying £1,000 for a horse to act as his lead horse in exercise gallops. On his first appearance as a three-year-old Pommern ran in the Craven Stakes at Newmarket. He was defeated by a colt named Rossendale, but as Pommern was conceding fifteen pounds to the winner it was considered a creditable performance. Ten days later he started the 2/1 favourite for the 2000 Guineas on 28 April in a field of sixteen runners. Ridden by Donohue, he won by three lengths and a head from Tournament and The Vizier.

With Epsom unavailable, a substitute "New Derby Stakes", with much a prize reduced from £6,500 to £2,400, was run at Newmarket on 15 June, two weeks later than originally planned. Pommern was made 11/10 favourite against sixteen opponents. He won the race by two lengths from Let Fly, with Rossendale a further three lengths back in third. The winning time of 2:32.8 was more than two seconds faster than any time recorded for the Derby at the more demanding and fractionally longer Epsom course. According to the Glasgow Herald, Pommern won the race "in the style of a really great horse".

There was no "New St Leger" in 1915 as the authorities at Doncaster Racecourse refused to allow the name of their race to be used at a different venue and the Newmarket substitute race was therefore called the September Stakes. The race was run over fourteen furlongs, shorter than the traditional Leger distance by 130 yards and carried prize money of only £1,250, less than a fifth of that won by Black Jester at Doncaster in 1914. Pommern started the 1/3 favourite and won by three lengths from the New Oaks Stakes winner Snow Marten with Achtoi six lengths back in third. It is usual to rank Pommern as a Triple Crown winner, despite the revised conditions of the second and third legs. On his final start of the year, Pommern won the Limekiln Stakes over ten furlongs at Newmarket, carrying 134 pounds and beating two opponents by seven lengths in impressive style.

Pommern's earnings for the season totaled £11,200, enabling Polymelus to claim the title of Champion sire for the second year in succession.

=== 1916: four-year-old season ===
Pommern was scheduled to be retired to stud, but in January 1916 Joel announced the horse would return to the racecourse. His only race of the year came at Newmarket, where he contested the June Stakes, a wartime substitute for the Coronation Cup. He won the mile and a half race from Russley, with the filly Silver Tag in third. According to press reports, Joel turned down an offer of £30,000 for his colt, and indicated that even a record £50,000 would not be sufficient. Pommern was a late withdrawal from the Champion Stakes in October, with some commentators suggesting that Joel did not wish to risk the horse's reputation against Lord Falmouth's 2000 Guineas winner Clarissimus.

== Assessment ==
In their book A Century of Champions, Tony Morris and John Randall rated Pommern a "superior" winner of both the 2000 Guineas and the Derby and the fifty-second best British horse of the 20th century.

At the end of his three-year-old season, Pommern was assigned a weight of 125 pounds in the Cambridgeshire Handicap, five pounds behind the four-year-old St Leger winner Black Jester.

== Stud record ==
Pommern retired to stud alongside his sire Polymelus at Solomon Joel's Maiden Erlegh Stud in Earley, Berkshire, at an initial fee of 300 guineas. Although he met with limited success, Pommern notably sired Adam's Apple (2000 Guineas Stakes, £11,750), Glommen (Goodwood Cup, £8,767), Pondoland (£10,345) and was the damsire of the 1934 1000 Guineas Stakes winner, Campanula.

Pommern was euthanized on 26 June 1935 at age twenty-three.

== Pedigree ==
Pedigree of Pommern (GB), bay stallion, 1912
Sire Polymelus (GB) 1902	Cyllene; 1895	Bona Vista	Bend Or
Sire Polymelus (GB) 1902	Cyllene; 1895	Bona Vista	Vista
Sire Polymelus (GB) 1902	Cyllene; 1895	Arcadia	Isonomy
Sire Polymelus (GB) 1902	Cyllene; 1895	Arcadia	Distant Shore
Sire Polymelus (GB) 1902	Maid Marian; 1886	Hampton	Lord Clifden
Sire Polymelus (GB) 1902	Maid Marian; 1886	Hampton	Lady Langden
Sire Polymelus (GB) 1902	Maid Marian; 1886	Quiver	Toxophilite
Sire Polymelus (GB) 1902	Maid Marian; 1886	Quiver	Young Melbourne mare
Dam Merry Agnes (GB) 1900	St. Hilaire; 1891	St. Simon	Galopin
Dam Merry Agnes (GB) 1900	St. Hilaire; 1891	St. Simon	St. Angela
Dam Merry Agnes (GB) 1900	St. Hilaire; 1891	Distant Shore	Hermit
Dam Merry Agnes (GB) 1900	St. Hilaire; 1891	Distant Shore	Lands End
Dam Merry Agnes (GB) 1900	Agnes Court; 1889	Hampton	Lord Clifden
Dam Merry Agnes (GB) 1900	Agnes Court; 1889	Hampton	Lady Langden
Dam Merry Agnes (GB) 1900	Agnes Court; 1889	Orphan Agnes	Speculum
Dam Merry Agnes (GB) 1900	Agnes Court; 1889	Orphan Agnes	Polly Agnes (Family:16-g)

- Pommern was inbred 3x3 to Hampton, meaning that the stallion appears twice in the third generation of his pedigree. He was also inbred 3x4 to the broodmare Distant Shore.
