= Adam's Apple (horse) =

British-bred Thoroughbred racehorse

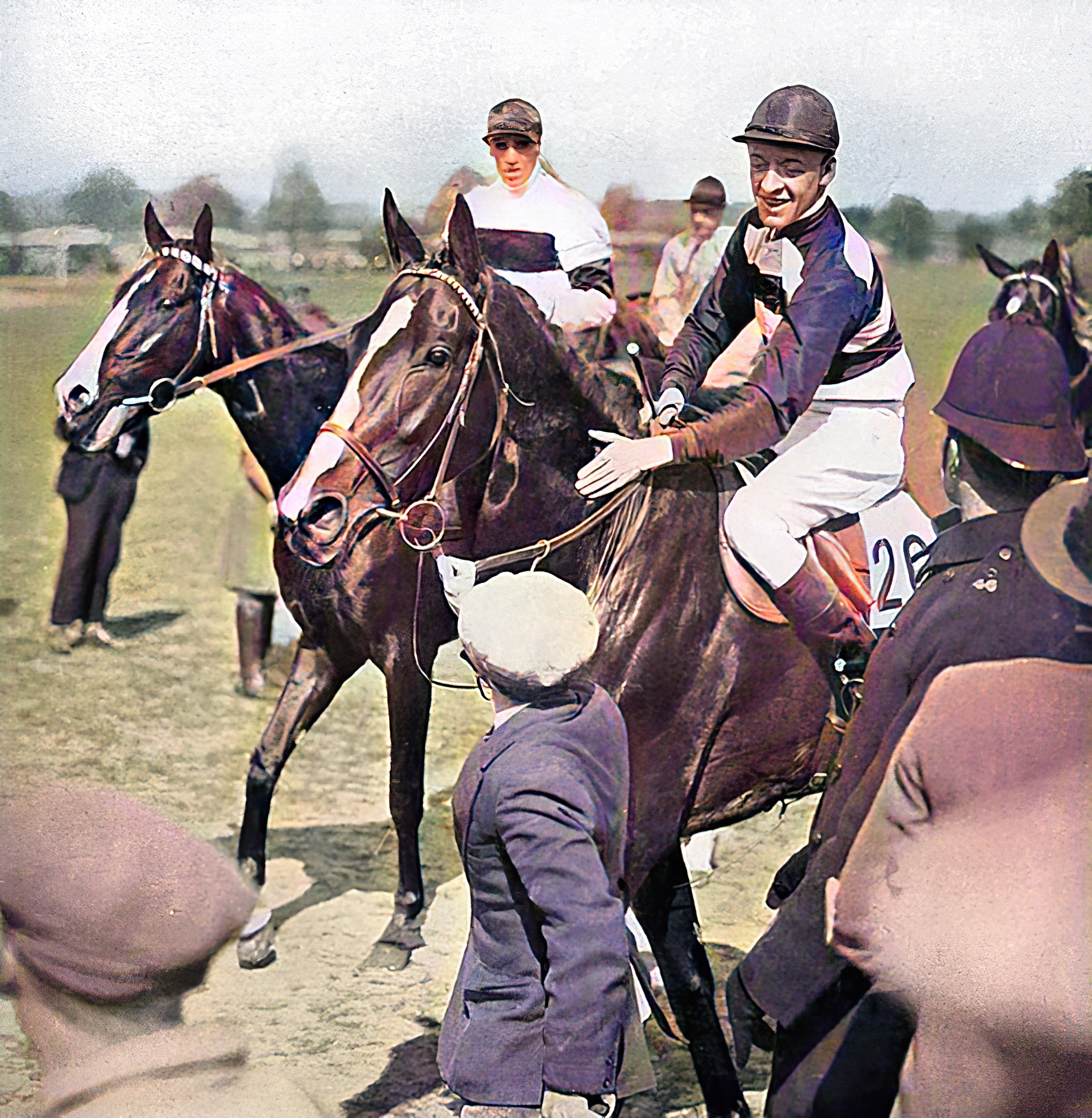
- J. Leach pats Adam's Apple after the 2000 Guineas. Applecross is in background.
- Sire: Pommern
- Grandsire: Polymelus
- Dam: Mount Whistle
- Damsire: William the Third
- Sex: Stallion
- Foaled: 1924
- Country: Great Britain
- Colour: Bay
- Breeder: Mrs Clarissa Sofer Whitburn
- Owner: Charles W. S. Whitburn
- Trainer: Harry L. Cottrill
- Record: 7-2-0-2

Major wins
- Soltykoff Stakes (1926); British Classic Race wins: 2000 Guineas Stakes (1927)
- Last updated on 25 June 2011

Adam's Apple (1924 – 1946) was a British Thoroughbred racehorse best known for winning a British Classic, the 2000 Guineas Stakes.

== Background ==
Adam's Apple was sired by Pommern, the 1915 English Triple Crown champion. His dam Mount Whistle was a daughter of the Ascot Gold Cup winner William the Third.

== Racing career ==
At age two, Adam's Apple won the Soltykoff Stakes at Newmarket Racecourse. He ran third in the 1926 Criterion Stakes at Newmarket Racecourse and third again in the New Stakes at Ascot Racecourse behind Sickle and the winner, Damon. He made four starts as a three-year-old, finishing off the board in three; however, he was ridden to victory by jockey Jack Leach in the 1927 2000 Guineas Stakes, defeating runner-up Call Boy (later The Derby winner), with Sickle third.

== Stud record ==
After his retirement from racing, Adam's Apple was sold to Argentine breeders. There he met with some success, siring the filly Chimentera, winner of the Las Oaks at Club Hipico de Santiago in Santiago, Chile, and the very good filly La Bastille, likewise a winner of the Oaks but who also defeated her male counterparts in winning the El Derby at the Valparaiso Sporting Club racetrack at Vina del Mar, Chile. Adam's Apple died in 1946 at Haras Ojo de Agua in Argentina.
