= Campanula (horse) =

British-bred Thoroughbred racehorse

- Sire: Blandford
- Grandsire: Swynford
- Dam: Vesper Bell
- Damsire: Pommern
- Sex: Mare
- Foaled: 1931
- Country: United Kingdom
- Colour: Bay
- Breeder: George Bullough
- Owner: George Bullough
- Trainer: Jack Jarvis
- Record: 8: 4-2-0

Major wins
- Windsor Castle Stakes (1933); Moulton Stakes (1933); Column Produce Stakes (1934); 1000 Guineas (1934)

Awards
- Top-rated British 2-y-o filly (1933)

Campanula (1931 – 1947) was a British Thoroughbred racehorse and broodmare. In 1933 she won two of her five races including the Windsor Castle Stakes and the Moulton Stakes and was rated the best juvenile filly in England. In the following spring she won the Column Produce Stakes and then recorded her biggest win in the 1000 Guineas. In her two subsequent races she finished fourth in the Epsom Oaks and second in the Champion Stakes. As a broodmare she exerted an enduring influence as a broodmare through her daughter Calluna.

== Background ==
Campanula was a bay mare with a white star bred and owned by George Bullough. She was trained throughout her racing career by Jack Jarvis at the Park Lodge stable in Newmarket, Suffolk. Physically she was described as a "beautiful" and "very charming" filly, but somewhat lacking in size and range.

She was sired by Blandford an Irish-bred stallion who won three of his four races including the Princess of Wales's Stakes. He went to become an outstanding breeding stallion who was a three-time Leading sire in Great Britain and Ireland and whose other offspring included Bahram, Blenheim, Brantôme, Udaipur and Windsor Lad. Campanula's dam Vesper Bell was descended from the influential British broodmare Perseverance (foaled 1865) by Voltigeur.

== Racing career ==
=== 1933: two-year-old season ===
After finishing fifth on her racecourse debut, Campanula ran second by a neck to the colt Colombo in the First Spring Stakes at Newmarket in late April. At Royal Ascot in June 1933 Campanula defeated male opposition to take the Windsor Castle Stakes and was described as one of the best juveniles seen at the meeting. She sustained a minor injury in September and missed an intended run in the Champagne Stakes at Doncaster, but returned to the track to win the Moulton Stakes at Newmarket, carrying top weight of 131 pounds.

In the Free Handicap, a ranking of the season's best two-year-olds, Campanula was rated the best filly, seven pounds behind Colombo who was the top colt.

=== 1934: three-year-old season ===
Campanula began her second season in the Column Produce Stakes at Newmarket in April and won by a short head from the colt Bright Bird, to whom she was conceding twelve pounds. On 4 May, ridden by Harry Wragg, she started 2/5 favourite for the 121st running of the 1000 Guineas over the Rowley Mile. The best of her nine rivals appeared to be Light Brocade who was owned by George Bullough's son-in-law John Lambton, 5th Earl of Durham. Campanula prevailed by a length from Light Brocade, with six lengths back to Spend A Penny in third.

A month later, Campanula, with Wragg again in the saddle, was strongly fancied to win the Oaks Stakes over one and one-half miles at Epsom Racecourse. Looking "keen and anxious" before the race she started poorly and never looked likely to win and finished fourth behind Light Brocade, Zelina and Instantaneous. After a four-month break Campanula returned in October for the Champion Stakes over ten furlongs at Newmarket in October and finished second to the Aga Khan's colt Umidwar.

Campanula earned a total of £7,433 in 1934.

== Assessment and honours ==
In their book, A Century of Champions, based on the Timeform rating system, John Randall and Tony Morris rated Campanula a "superior" winner of the 1000 Guineas and the best British filly of her generation.

== Breeding record ==
After her retirement from racing Campanula became a broodmare and produced at least eight foals between 1936 and her death in 1947:

- Pusilla, a chestnut filly, foaled in 1936, sired by Dastur
- Camperdown, colt, 1937, by Hyperion
- Hare Bell, bay filly, 1939, by Mieuxce
- Jacinth, chestnut filly, 1940, by Mieuxce
- Carpatica, chestnut filly, 1942, by Hyperion
- Calluna, brown filly, 1943, by Hyperion. An outstanding broodmare whose descendants have included Bolkonski, Vitiges, Tony Bin, Athens Wood, Viva Pataca and Dibidale.
- Zoysia, brown filly, 1945, by Hyperion
- Cassiope, chestnut filly, 1946, by Hyperion

== Pedigree ==
Pedigree of Campanula (GB), bay mare, 1931
Sire Blandford (IRE) 1919	Swynford (GB); 1907	John O’Gaunt	Isinglass
Sire Blandford (IRE) 1919	Swynford (GB); 1907	John O’Gaunt	La Fleche
Sire Blandford (IRE) 1919	Swynford (GB); 1907	Canterbury Pilgrim	Tristan
Sire Blandford (IRE) 1919	Swynford (GB); 1907	Canterbury Pilgrim	Pilgrimage
Sire Blandford (IRE) 1919	Blanche (IRE); 1912	White Eagle	Gallinule (GB)
Sire Blandford (IRE) 1919	Blanche (IRE); 1912	White Eagle	Merry Gal (GB)
Sire Blandford (IRE) 1919	Blanche (IRE); 1912	Black Cherry (GB)	Bendigo (IRE)
Sire Blandford (IRE) 1919	Blanche (IRE); 1912	Black Cherry (GB)	Black Duchess
Dam Vesper Bell (GB) 1921	Pommern (GB); 1912	Polymelus	Cyllene
Dam Vesper Bell (GB) 1921	Pommern (GB); 1912	Polymelus	Maid Marian
Dam Vesper Bell (GB) 1921	Pommern (GB); 1912	Merry Agnes	St Hilaire
Dam Vesper Bell (GB) 1921	Pommern (GB); 1912	Merry Agnes	Agnes Court
Dam Vesper Bell (GB) 1921	St Catrine (GB); 1911	St Frusquin	St Simon
Dam Vesper Bell (GB) 1921	St Catrine (GB); 1911	St Frusquin	Isabel
Dam Vesper Bell (GB) 1921	St Catrine (GB); 1911	Catrine	Ayrshire
Dam Vesper Bell (GB) 1921	St Catrine (GB); 1911	Catrine	Mine d'Or (Family 19-b)
