= Madiz =

British Vessel / Boat

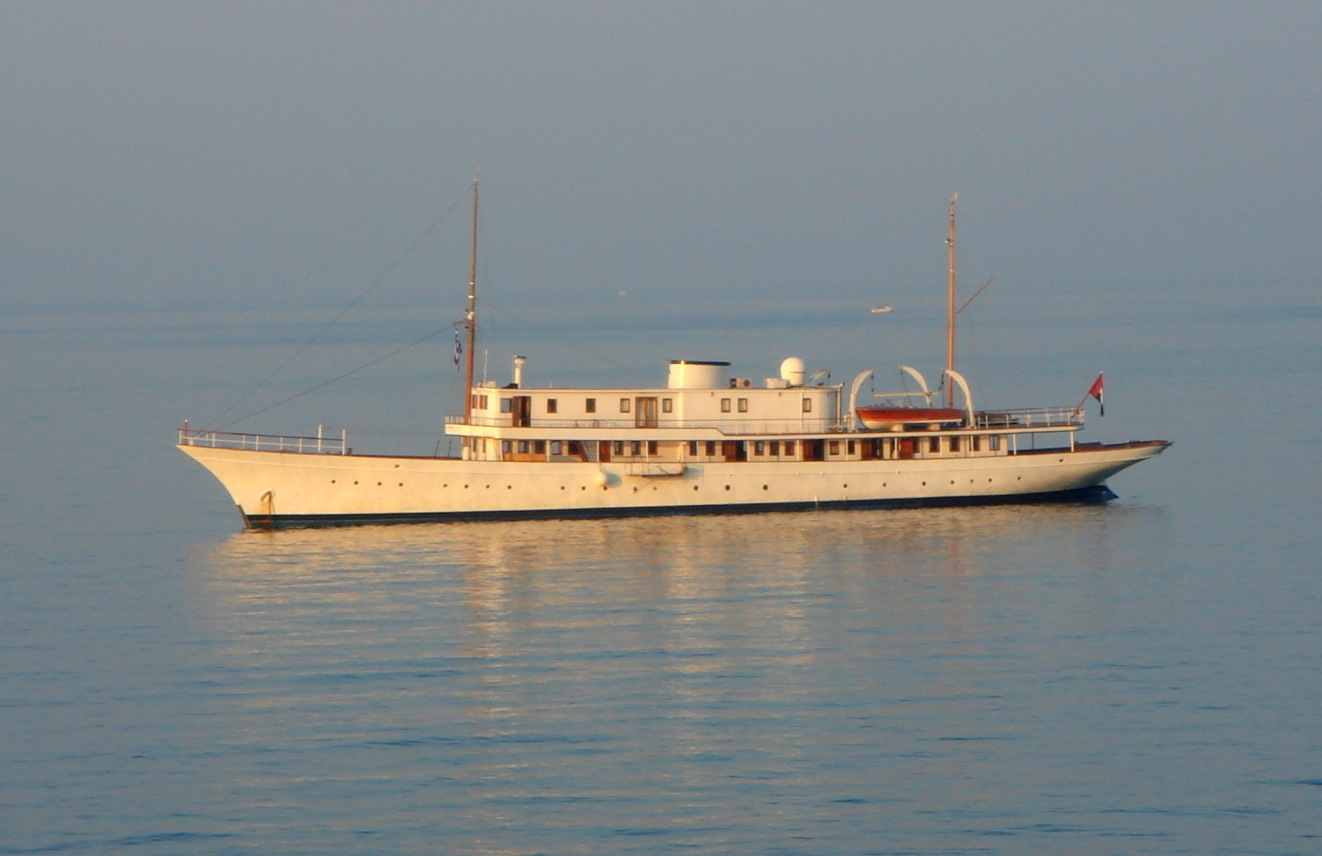
- M/Y Madiz in 2007

History

United Kingdom
- Name: Triton; Rhouma; Osprey; HMS Hiniesta; President Roberts; Madiz
- Builder: Ailsa Shipbuilding Company, Troon
- Launched: 1902
- Identification: IMO number: 8978356

General characteristics
- Length: 181 ft 8 in (55.37 m) over all
- Beam: 22 ft 5 in (6.83 m)
- Draught: 13 ft 1 in (3.99 m)
- Installed power: 2 MTU Mercedes Maybach diesel engines
- Speed: 11.5 kn (21.3 km/h; 13.2 mph)
- Capacity: 14
- Crew: 10

Madiz is a 55 metre twin screw steel yacht built on the River Clyde in Scotland, in 1902. In 2006, she broke a record in the shipping industry by being the only ship in the world to be in class "+100A1" with Lloyd's Register of Shipping, 100 years after the date of its building.

== Construction ==
Madiz was designed by G. L. Watson, and It is the last surviving ship to have been designed by him personally. She was built by the Ailsa Shipyard in Troon, Scotland on the Clyde.

Madiz is a classic yacht and retains most of her original deck equipment and unique panelling, the original Burma teak on much of the deck and all the deck’s side panelings. Cuban mahogany in the original master bedrooms and solid oak paneling in the reception areas.

Originally she was powered by two steam engines. These were later replaced by two MTU Mercedes Maybach diesel engines.

== History ==
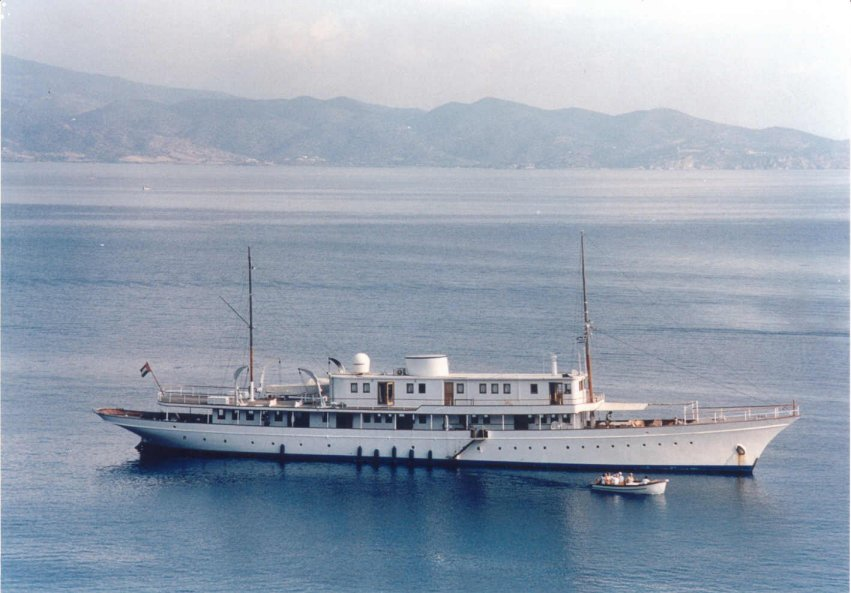
Madiz in Ydra in 2002

The yacht was originally named Triton and her first owner was James Coats. Following his death, she was purchased in 1913 by Sir George Bullough, owner of the Scottish island of Rùm. He renamed her Rhouma. During World War I, Rhouma was hired for use as an auxiliary patrol yacht. Between the wars, she was lengthened and had an upper deck of cabins added, and her engines were converted to run on oil fuel.

In World War II, she served in the Royal Navy as the Royal Patrol Yacht, HMS Hiniesta, and was used for calibrating huff-duff equipment in GB coastal waters. She later transported King George VI, Queen Elizabeth and Princess Elizabeth on a short victory tour.

In 1970 she was bought by Greek businessman Costas Keletseki, who renamed her Madiz and had her extensively rebuilt, restoring the original fittings but also modernizing with a conversion from steam to diesel engines.

In 1989 Madiz was used as the primary setting for an episode of the British TV series Agatha Christie's Poirot.

Between 2003 and 2006, Madiz underwent another major refit and was re-classed under Lloyd’s Register of Shipping in her original Class of +100A1. After Keletsekis died in 2009, the ship was sold and was available for charter. In March 2024 Madiz was placed up for sale again.

Original Midship Section drawing, in 1902
