= Kinloch Castle =

Scottish Victorian mansion

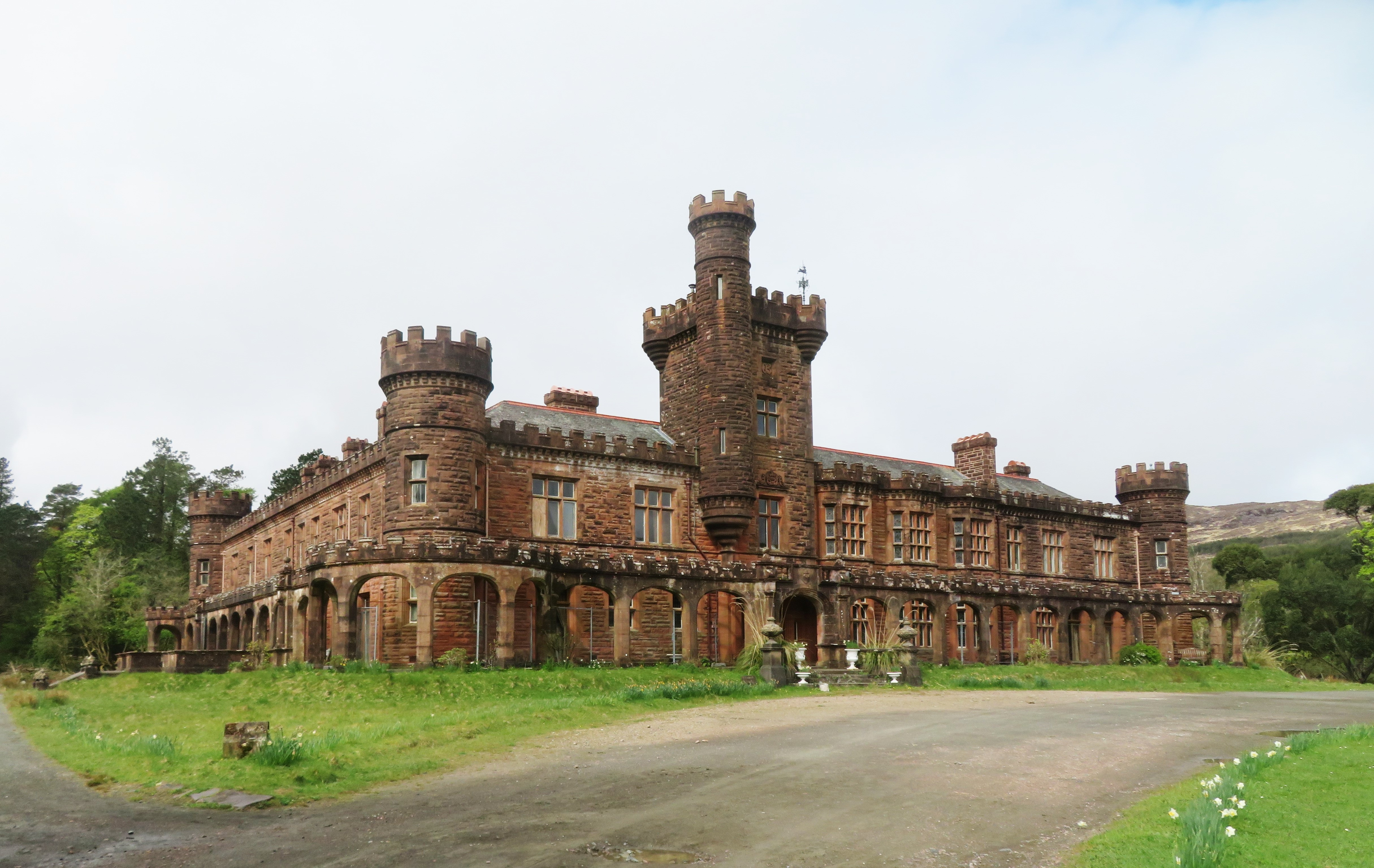
- Kinloch Castle in 2022

- Location in the Small Isles
- 57.0136°N 6.2825°W

Listed Building – Category A
- Designated: 15 October 1971
- Reference no.: LB14125

Inventory of Gardens and Designed Landscapes in Scotland
- Official name: Kinloch Castle
- Designated: 31 March 2003
- Reference no.: GDL00242

Kinloch Castle (Scottish Gaelic: Caisteal Cheann Locha) is an Edwardian mansion located on Kinloch, on the island of Rùm, one of the Small Isles off the west coast of Scotland. It was built as a private residence for Sir George Bullough, a textile tycoon from Lancashire whose father bought Rùm as his summer residence and shooting estate. Construction began in 1897, and was completed in 1900. Built as a luxurious retreat, Kinloch Castle has since declined. The castle and island are now owned by NatureScot (formerly Scottish Natural Heritage), who operated part of the castle as a hostel until 2015. The Kinloch Castle Friends Association was established in 1996 to secure the long-term future of the building.

Kinloch Castle is protected as a category A listed building, and the grounds are included in the Inventory of Gardens and Designed Landscapes in Scotland, the national listing of significant gardens.

== History ==
Rùm was owned by Alexander Maclean of Coll in the early 19th century. At that time, during the Napoleonic Wars, kelp from the Scottish islands was a valuable commodity, being used to produce soda ash for use in explosives. After the war, prices collapsed and Maclean was forced to lease the island to a relative, Lachlan Maclean, for sheep farming. As a result, the entire population, which counted 443 people in 1795, were cleared from the island by 1828, only for new tenants to be brought in from Skye and Muck to service the sheep farm.

Lachlan Maclean constructed Kinloch House, on a site to the north-east of the present castle, but was forced to give up the lease in the late 1830s. Hugh Maclean of Coll then sold the island in 1845 to Conservative politician James Gascoyne-Cecil, 2nd Marquess of Salisbury (1791–1868), for £26,455. Lord Salisbury reorganised the sheep farm, constructing new cottages linked by roads to a pier at Kinloch. Salisbury also reintroduced red deer and game. He passed the estate to his son, Viscount Cranborne (1821–1865), on whose death it was inherited by his brother, Robert Gascoyne-Cecil, later 3rd Marquess of Salisbury, and Prime Minister of the United Kingdom. However, he sold Rùm in 1870 to Farquhar Campbell of Aros. The shooting lodge at Tigh Ban was built around this time.

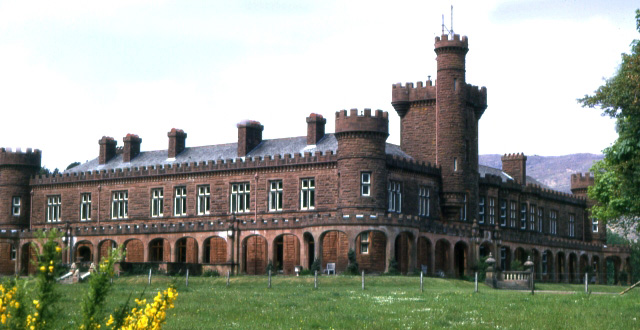
Kinloch Castle in 1974

=== The Bulloughs ===
From 1879, the shooting lease was taken by John Bullough (1838–1891), a textile-mill owner from Lancashire. In 1884 Bullough purchased Meggernie Castle in Perthshire, and in 1888 he bought Rùm for £35,000. His intention was to create a shooting reserve, and he introduced new stock of deer and game birds, as well as planting trees. When he died in 1891, his son George Bullough inherited, and built a mausoleum to his father on the island. The first mausoleum, decorated with ceramic tiles, was compared to a public toilet, and Bullough had it demolished, replacing it with the Doric temple which stands today.

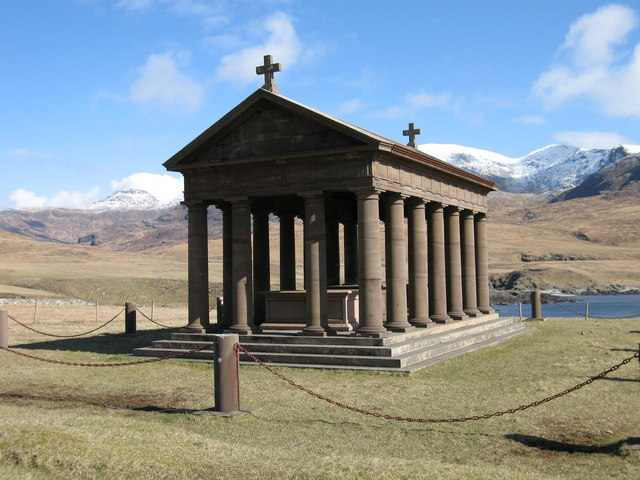
The Bullough Mausoleum at Harris

He then commissioned a London firm of architects, Leeming & Leeming, to design a luxurious new house. Work on Kinloch Castle began in 1897, employing 300 men from Eigg and Lancashire. The house was built in a castellated Tudor style, using red sandstone from Annan in Dumfries and Galloway. It had its own electricity supply, and also had modern plumbing, heating and telephone systems. A mechanical orchestrion, manufactured in Germany, was installed to provide music in the hall. Kinloch Castle was completed in 1900, at a total cost of £250,000, although further changes were made following Bullough's marriage in 1903. Formal and informal gardens, including a water garden, Japanese garden, bowling green and golf course, were laid out by 1912, using topsoil imported from Ayrshire. A walled garden with glasshouses was erected, which also briefly housed alligators.

During the Boer War, Bullough lent his yacht Rhouma as a hospital ship, bringing wounded soldiers back to Kinloch Castle. For this service he was knighted in 1901. Kinloch Castle was occupied by Bullough and his friends during the shooting season each year, but they visited less frequently after the First World War, and the estate was neglected. The island's population dwindled from 100 in 1900 to 28 in 1951. After Sir George Bullough's death in 1939, the castle and the island were held by trustees, who sold the estate in 1957, retaining only the family mausoleum. In 1967 Sir George's widow Monica was buried at the mausoleum, alongside her husband.

=== Public ownership ===
The island was purchased by the Nature Conservancy, a government agency with responsibility for natural heritage, for £23,000, and was designated a National Nature Reserve in line with Lady Bullough's wishes. Ownership of Rùm and Kinloch Castle passed to Scottish Natural Heritage (SNH) on its formation in 1992. SNH is now known as NatureScot.

The castle appeared on the BBC television series Restoration in 2003, as part of a bid for funds to restore the structure, reaching the final stages of the competition. Although it did not win, its cause was later taken up by the Prince's Regeneration Trust, a charity established by the then Prince Charles, which promotes heritage-led regeneration schemes. Funds were sought for an £8 million scheme to restore the castle, however this scheme did not progress.

=== Present use ===
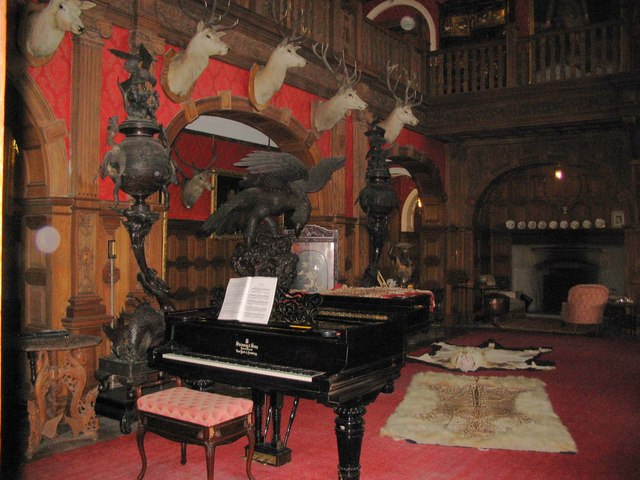
Entrance hall

Kinloch Castle is now managed by NatureScot (formerly Scottish Natural Heritage), supported by the Kinloch Castle Friends' Association, a registered charitable organisation set up in 1996. A number of repairs were carried out in 2010 and 2011, although the long-term future of the building remains uncertain. Tours of the castle continue to be available, timed to coincide with ferries where possible. Highlights of the tour include the under-stairs orchestrion and a variety of gifts from the Emperor of Japan.

A section at the rear of the castle was operated as a hostel for visitors to the island. Guests had a choice of bunk rooms, or could upgrade to one of a handful of "Oak Rooms" with four-poster beds. The hostel area was kept separate from the museum rooms of the castle. The hostel closed in 2015.

In 2017 the Kinloch Castle Friends' Association began to examine the possibility of creation of a community interest company to take over the running the Castle from SNH. In March 2018, the association decided to formally apply for an asset transfer of the castle and policies and to negotiate the transfer of the contents of the castle. The initial aim is to reopen the hostel accommodation in order to generate income to help to support the castle whilst external funding is sought for more major restoration work.

In June 2022, businessman Jeremy Hosking announced his intention of purchasing the castle subject to planning permission for the restoration of the building and its conversion to visitor accommodation. In March 2023, he withdrew his purchase offer after the Scottish government put the sale on hold because of concerns raised by the Isle of Rum Community Trust. In 2025, NatureScot again put the castle on the market, with an asking price of £750,000. In September 2026, the agency announced that it was negotiating with an unnamed "preferred bidder" who planned to restore the castle "according to conservation best practice to protect its historic fabric and interiors", and to convert it to a "boutique heritage hotel".

== Social significance ==
A report conducted in 2002 by SNH summarised the social significance of Kinloch Castle and the diverging attitudes towards it as follows:

Kinloch Castle has an extremely high social significance, as both a representative of a type of development and lifestyle which exerted considerable influence over land-use in Scotland, and also as associated with a very specific social history of interest in itself in terms of its glamour, its notoriety and the unusual "completeness" to which lifestyle evidence has survived.

The report indicated that Kinloch Castle did not represent any significant design or technical values but this was made up for by the fact that it was a monument to a certain type of social lifestyle existing at the time.

Kinloch Castle is of an externally uninspired design with an unusual though not unserviceable plan, built by clearly competent but yet undistinguished architects who may well have been in some respects "prisoners" of their client’s strong will to the detriment of the overall conception......In terms of general construction technology, Kinloch offered no advance on existing practice.

The social-political monument that it does represent is described as "[A]n extreme example – an "exemplar" even - of the worst kind of highland landlordism" as well as "representative of a social phenomenon for which his (Bullough's) period was noted: third-generation new wealth, opulent lifestyle, sporting interests embracing horseracing, and belonging to the "smart" set (who saw genial but luxuriously-living Edward, Prince of Wales as their exemplar) rather than subscribing to Victorian morality"

Jim Crumley, a Scottish nature writer, described Kinloch Castle as "a monument to… colossal wealth and ego and acquisitive greed… It is a building without a redeeming feature.. a loathsome edifice. It perpetuates only the memory of the worst kind of island lairds… a hideous affront, but nothing that a good fire and subsequent demolition couldn’t rectify".

== Sources ==
- Glen, Michael H.; Scotland Natural Heritage; Royal Commission on the Ancient and Historical Monuments of Scotland (1999). Rum National Nature Reserve: Kinloch Castle (PDF). Battleby: SNH Publications. ISBN 978-1-85397-043-6. Archived from the original (PDF) on 4 March 2016.
- Scottish Natural Heritage report, 2002. Accessed 2013.
