= George Bullough =

English playboy and horse breeder (1870–1939)

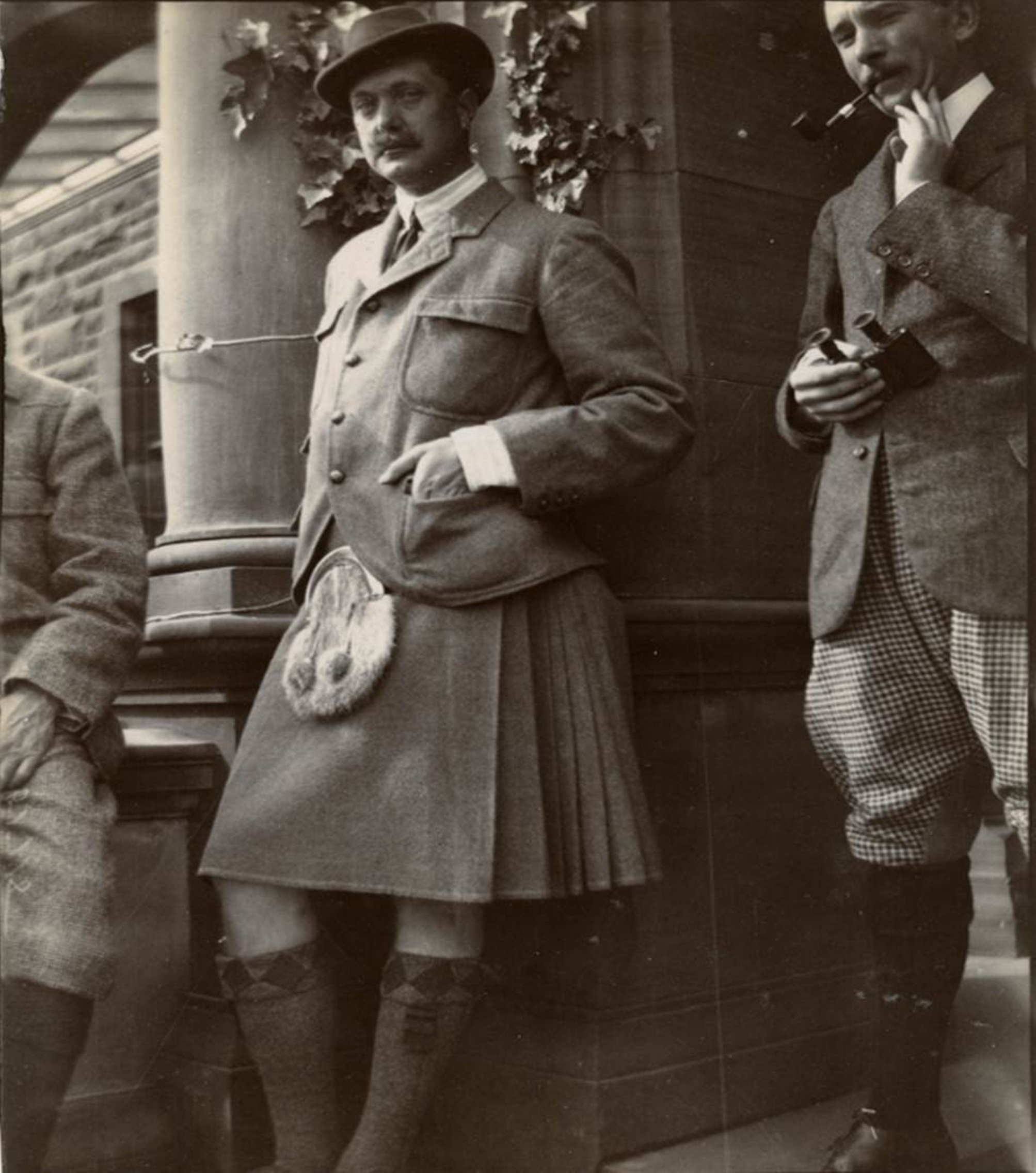
Sir George Bullough (1870–1939).

Sir George Bullough, 1st Baronet (28 February 1870 – 26 July 1939) was a late Victorian playboy and was an owner and breeder of thoroughbred racehorses.

== Biography ==
=== Early life ===
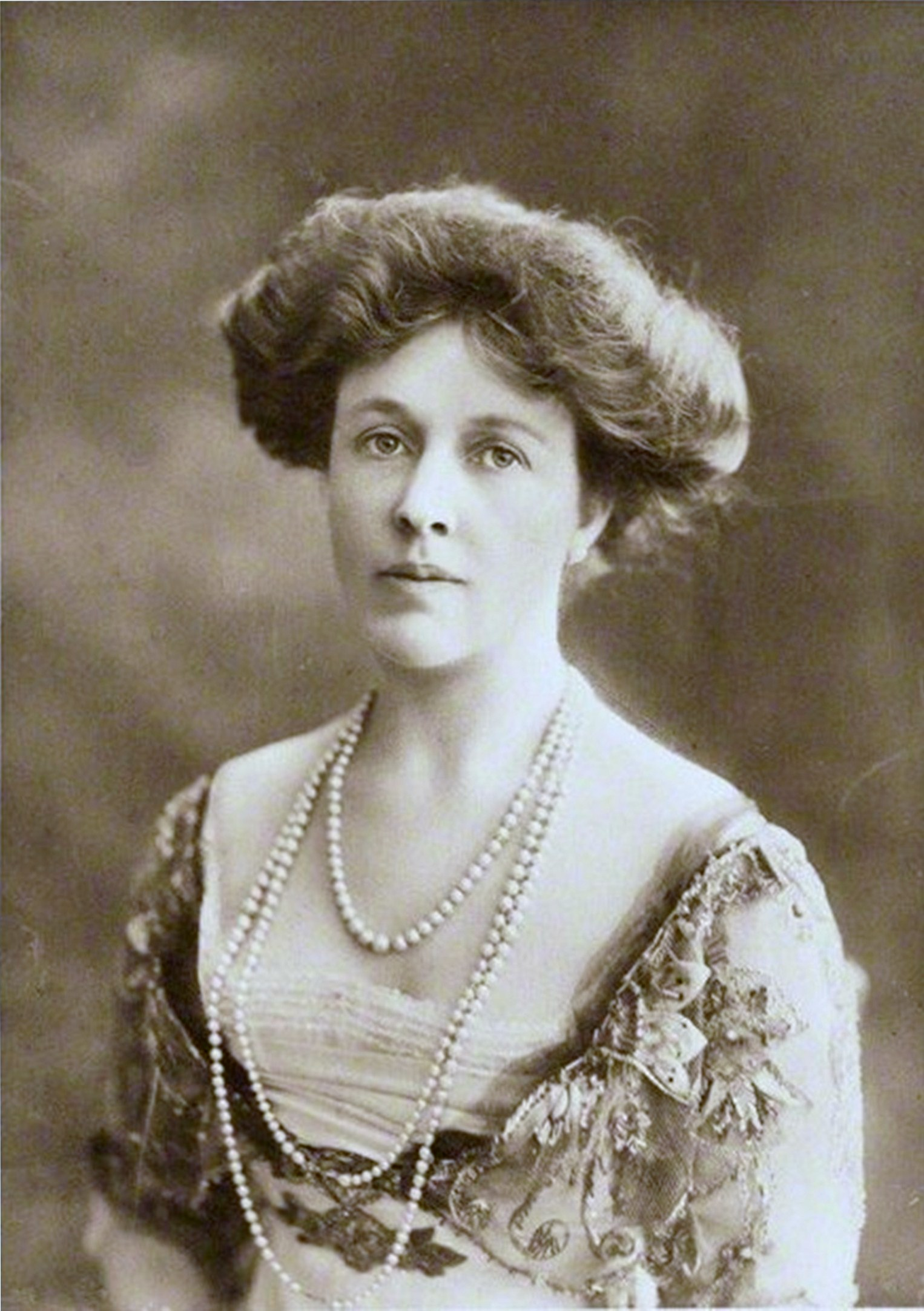
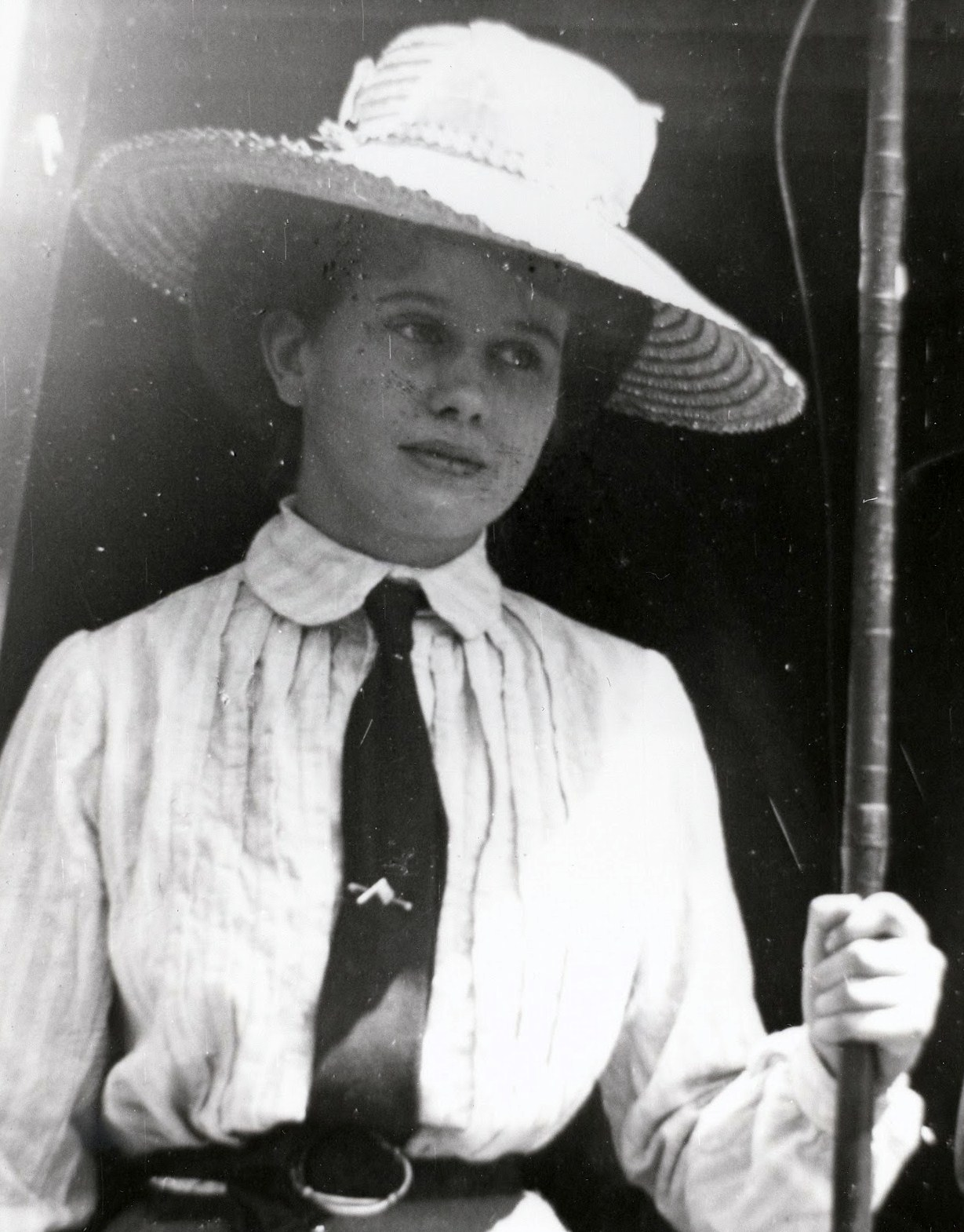
Monica Lilly, Lady Bullough was born in Christchurch, New Zealand on 7 April 1869. Her mother died the following day. She was the eldest daughter of French aristocrat Gerard Gustavus Ducarel (1838–1916), 4th Marquis de la Pasture, and Leontine Standish (1843–1869). Monique Ducarel de la Pasture married Sir George Bullough on 24 June 1903 at Kinloch Castle, Rùm Island. Lady Bullough died in Newmarket, Warren Hill, Suffolk, United Kingdom, on 22 May 1967.

Born in Accrington, Lancashire, George Bullough was educated at Harrow School. In 1891, the 21-year-old George Bullough and half-brother Ian each inherited a half interest in Howard & Bullough, their father's successful textile machinery manufacturing company. George also inherited the island of Rùm, the family's sporting estate in the Inner Hebrides where he had Kinloch Castle built between 1898 and 1901.

In 1903, George Bullough married Monique Lilly de la Pasture whose family had an estate at Montreuil-sur-Mer in northern France. Known as Lady Monica, she obtained a divorce from Charles Edward Charrington, member of the wealthy Charrington family, in order to marry Bullough. She was the eldest daughter of the 4th Marquis de la Pasture whose aristocrat ancestors had fled the French Revolution and Leontine Standish (1843–1869), daughter of Charles Strickland Standish (1790–1863), a Whig politician and Lord of the manor of Standish. They had one daughter, Hermione (born 5 November 1906 - died 27 October 1990), who married John Lambton, 5th Earl of Durham.

Other than the income it provided, George Bullough had little interest in the family business. With his wealth, he chose to pursue an interest in yachting and thoroughbred horse racing as well as hunting, serving as Master of the Ledbury Foxhounds from 1908 through 1921. He acquired an ocean-going steam-powered yacht, Rhouma, in which he travelled extensively. Following the outbreak of the Second Boer War, Bullough converted his yacht to a hospital ship and sailed it to South Africa for service. [The Graphic 8 December 1900 p864 has pictures] As a result of his support of the war effort, in December 1901 he was knighted by King Edward VII. He also donated the Bullough Cup for competition in shinty in Argyll and Lorn; this trophy is still played for today.

In 1909, Sir George Bullough bought the Down House, Redmarley, where he moved his stud, breeding horses which became well known, such as Ethnarch, Grand Vitesse, Valois and Ellanvale.

In 1913, he bought a 1902 steel yacht, which he also named Rhouma; it was hired by the Royal Navy for use as an auxiliary patrol yacht during the First World War. She was later used as a Royal Patrol Yacht during World War II.

Bullough served as a cavalry officer with the Imperial Yeomanry from 1908 to 1911 and because of his horsemanship, during World War I he was appointed a superintendent with the Remount Department with the rank of major. For his services to his country, George Bullough was created a baronet "of the island of Rùm and of Down House in the parish of Redmarley in the County of Worcester" on 21 January 1916.

=== Thoroughbred horse racing ===
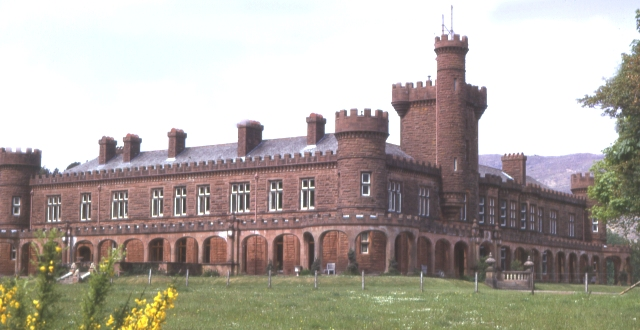
Kinloch Castle, built by George Bullough in 1900.

An avid sportsman, Sir George Bullough had a lifelong interest in horses. Interested in Thoroughbred racing, he eventually became a member of the National Hunt Committee and a member of the Jockey Club. He developed a significant racing stable that had its first major success in steeplechase with Ballymacad which won the 1917 War National, ran at Gatwick racecourse in place of the Grand National. Investing in flat racing Thoroughbreds, his Irish-bred colt Golden Myth won several important English races including the 1922 Ascot Gold Cup and Eclipse Stakes. When Golden Myth retired to stud, Bullough teamed up with prominent trainer John L. Jarvis to establish Longholes Stud near Newmarket. In 1934, they won an English Classic when Campanula captured the 1,000 Guineas.

=== Death ===
Sir George Bullough died in 1939 while playing golf in France. He was buried alongside his father, John, in the Bullough Mausoleum at Harris on the west coast of Rùm.

Baronetage of the United Kingdom
New creation	Baronet (of Kinlock Castle); 1916–1939	Extinct
