= Redgorton =

Coordinates: 56.441649°N 3.479204°W

Redgorton: Scottish Gaelic: Ràth a' Ghoirtein; Scots: Rochgorton
- Location within Perth and Kinross
- OS grid reference: NO089287
- Council area: Perth and Kinross
- Lieutenancy area: Perth and Kinross
- Country: Scotland
- Sovereign state: United Kingdom
- Post town: PERTH
- Postcode district: PH1
- Dialling code: 01738
- Police: Scotland
- Fire: Scottish
- Ambulance: Scottish
- UK Parliament: Ochil & South Perthshire
- Scottish Parliament: North Tayside; North East Scotland

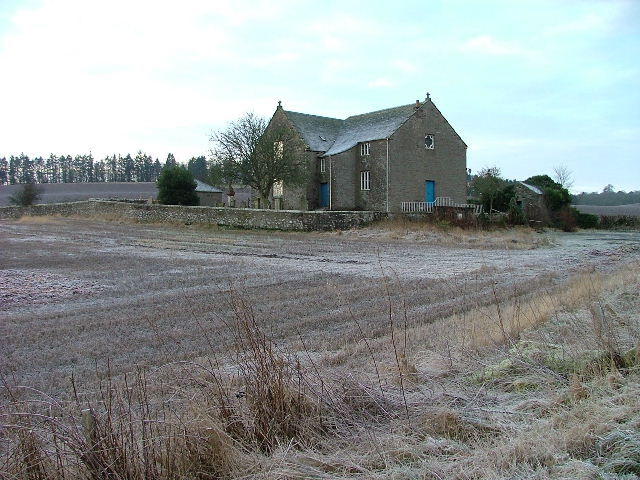
Redgorton Church

Redgorton is a settlement in Gowrie, Perth and Kinross, Scotland. It lies a few miles from the River Tay and the A9 road, across the latter from Luncarty. It lies close to the Inveralmond Industrial Estate.

== Etymology ==
The first recorded spelling of Redgorton was Rochgorton, this can be found in a charter of King David I preserved in the chartulary of Scone. The prefix of the current name, can be seen as translation of the Gaelic word Roch, or Ruach, which means 'red.' Gorton, or Garton, suggests "a little field;". The name as a whole, Redgorton, can be interpreted as 'the red field or field of blood,' and it has been mooted that it arose on account of the proximity of the Battle of Luncarty, which took place near Redgorton in c. 980AD between the Danes and the Scots.

Further weight is added to this interpretation by the name, Battleby given to the Scottish Natural Heritage centre just outside Redgorton.

There is much misinformation about the battle, most of which was propagated by the historian Hector Boece in his Scottish History of 1526. It likely the myth was generated at the bequest of the Hays of Errol to increase the legitimacy of them holding substantial lands in the area. Boece's account suggest they gained their lands as a reward from Kenneth III for their services in the battle.

== The Redgorton Witches ==
In 1656 four residents of Redgorton were accused of being witches, however, no record of their names or alleged crimes remains.

== Morthouse ==
A morthouse dated 1832 is located in the churchyard, but as this post-dates the Anatomy Act it is unconnected to bodysnatching.

== Save Redgorton Campaign ==
In 2010 a campaign was started opposing one of Perth and Kinross Council's proposed routes for a new Perth Bypass. The proposed road would run across the River Tay from Scone to Huntingtower and campaigners suggest that it will result in the demolition of houses in Redgorton and destroy the character of the settlement.

The Campaign also led to the establishment of the Luncarty and Redgorton Community Council in late 2010.
