= Battleby =

Country house in Perth and Kinross, Scotland

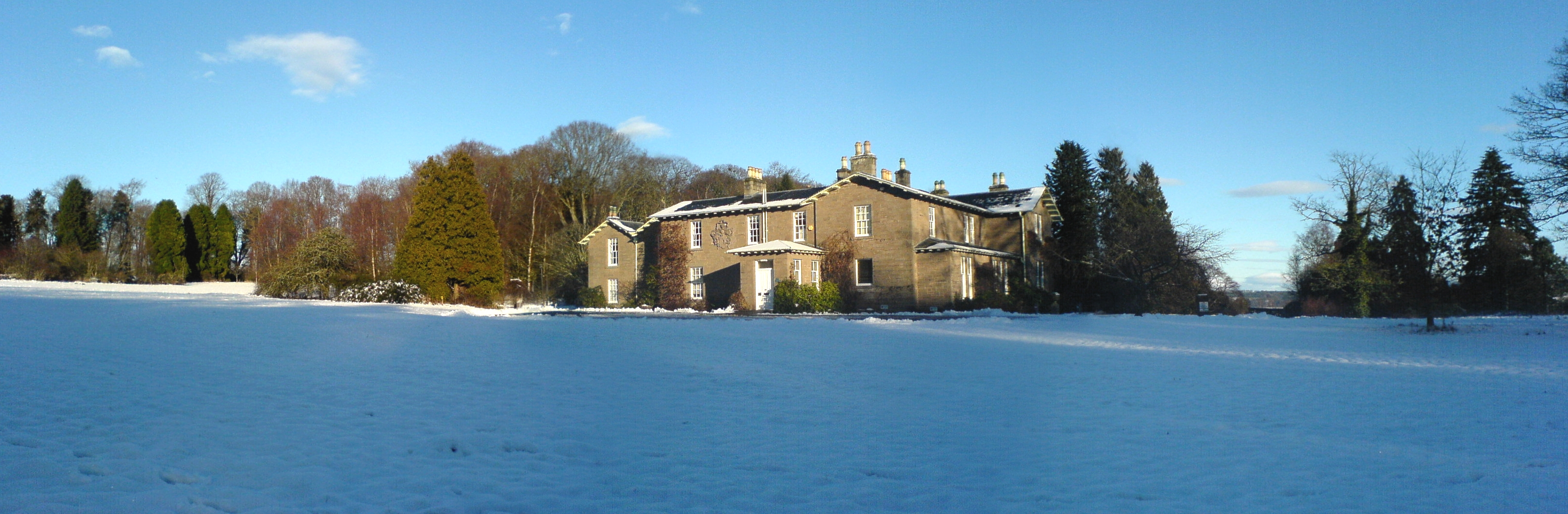

- Location in Perth and Kinross
- 56.4456°N 3.4848°W

Listed Building – Category B
- Designated: 5 October 1971
- Reference no.: LB17905

Inventory of Gardens and Designed Landscapes in Scotland
- Official name: Battleby
- Designated: 30 June 1987
- Reference no.: GDL00050

Battleby is a country house in Perth and Kinross, Scotland. It is in the parish of Redgorton, 1 kilometre (0.62 mi) west of Luncarty and 6 kilometres (3.7 mi) north of Perth. The 19th-century house is occupied by Scottish Natural Heritage, and is protected as a category B listed building. The grounds are listed on the Inventory of Gardens and Designed Landscapes in Scotland, the national listing of significant gardens, for their important plant collection.

== History ==
The estate is named after the Battle of Luncarty, recorded by Hector Boece as a battle between Scots and Danes in 990, although a later historian has doubted whether such a battle occurred.

The Battleby estate was acquired in the 19th century by the Maxtone-Graham family. The house was built around 1862, to designs by the Perth-based architect David Smart. The design of the house shows the influence of Alexander Thomson. The Grahams also laid out the grounds of the house, and planted many of the trees which still remain.

Later in the 19th century the house was leased, and served as a hospital during the First World War. Battleby was bought in 1947 by Sir Alexander Cross, who built up an important plant collection in the grounds. In 1970 the house was purchased by the Countryside Commission for Scotland, a public body with responsibility for natural heritage, and was converted for use as their national headquarters, with a visitor centre designed by Morris and Steedman. In 1992, the Countryside Commission for Scotland was replaced with a new body, Scottish Natural Heritage (SNH). SNH later moved their main headquarters to Inverness, and Battleby now serves as a local office within the Tayside and Grampian Area Management Unit.
